= Sabato Morais =

Italian-American rabbi

Rabbi Sabato Morais
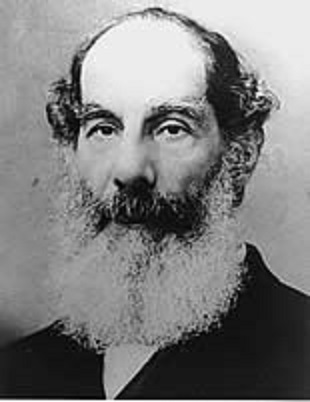
- Sabato Morais, Jewish Encyclopedia (1906)
- Born: April 13, 1823; Livorno, Italy
- Died: November 11, 1897 (aged 74); Philadelphia, Pennsylvania, US
- Burial place: Mikveh Israel Cemetery (Federal Street Burial Ground)
- Occupations: Rabbi, Posek
- Employer: Congregation Mikveh Israel
- Children: 7, Including Henry Samuel Morais

Sabato "Samuel" Morais (Hebrew: שבתאי מוראיס; April 13, 1823 – November 11, 1897) was an Italian-American rabbi of Portuguese descent, leader of Mikveh Israel Synagogue in Philadelphia, pioneer of Italian Jewish Studies in America, and founder of the Jewish Theological Seminary, which initially acted as a center of education for Orthodox Rabbis.

== Early years ==
Morais was born in Livorno, Italy. He was the elder son and the third of nine children of Samuel and Bona Morais. The Morais family came originally from Portugal, being probably among the large number of Jews who fled thence from the Inquisition. At the time of Sabato's birth, Italy was in the thick of her great struggle for freedom. Samuel Morais was an ardent republican, at one time undergoing imprisonment for his political views, and his father, Samuel Morais, was prominently identified with the political movements of his day.

Upon young Sabato early rested the responsibility of aiding in the support of the family. While still a child he earned a little by teaching Hebrew hymns and prayers to other children, meantime pursuing his own studies under Rabbis Funaro, Curiat, and others, and then under his Hebrew master, Rabbi Abraham Baruch Piperno, and gaining honorable mention in belles-lettres under Prof. Salvatore de Benedetti. In addition to Hebrew and Italian, he acquired familiarity with Aramaic, French, and Spanish.

He remained at his home studying and teaching until 1845, when he went to London to apply for the vacant post of assistant hazzan of the Spanish and Portuguese congregation in that city. (The position of "hazzan", literally "cantor", in the context of 19th-century American Judaism was generally equivalent to the contemporary position of "rabbi"). Owing to his unfamiliarity with English he was unsuccessful and returned to his home, but in the following year (1846) he accepted an invitation to become Hebrew master of the Orphans' School of the same congregation. Here he remained five years, meantime perfecting himself in English. During this period he formed a close friendship with Joseph Mazzini, and that patriot's struggle for Italian freedom was warmly seconded by Morais.

== Elected hazzan in Philadelphia ==
In 1850, owing to the withdrawal of Isaac Leeser, the pulpit of the Mikveh Israel Synagogue congregation at Philadelphia, became vacant, and Morais was an applicant for the post. He arrived in Philadelphia on March 17, 1851, and was elected April 13 following, the synagogue services in the interval being conducted by him. In 1855 he married Clara Esther Weil, who died in 1872, leaving seven children. From the date of his installation as hazzan until his death his influence was a continually growing power for traditional (Orthodox) Judaism. The synagogue formerly (c.1906) occupied by the Mikveh Israel congregation was built and consecrated during his incumbency.

Though his ministry covered the period of greatest activity in the adaptation of Judaism in America to changed conditions, he, as the advocate of Orthodox Judaism, withstood every appeal in behalf of ritualistic innovations and departures from traditional practice, winning the esteem of his opponents by his consistency and integrity. His sermons covered a wide scope of thought and action, and he showed the loftiness of his spirit when, in spite of congregational opposition to the expression of his views during the American Civil War, he continued, both in prayer and in his discourses, to show his warm sympathy with the cause of the slave. In appreciation of his attitude during these trying times the Union League Club of Philadelphia placed him on the roll of its honorary members.

== Aids in founding the Theological Seminary ==
When, in 1867, Maimonides College was established in Philadelphia, Morais was made professor of the Bible and of Biblical literature, and he held the chair during the six years that the college existed. For a number of years thereafter he felt the urgent need of an institution for the training of Jewish ministers on historical and traditional lines, and the declarations of the Pittsburg Conference in 1885 urged him to immediate action. After a considerable agitation of the subject he succeeded, in conjunction with a few others, in establishing (January, 1886) the Jewish Theological Seminary at New York.

He was at once made president of the faculty and professor of Bible, holding both posts until his death. Unquestionably the establishment of the seminary constitutes Morais' most lasting influence upon Judaism in America. The directors of that body have fittingly recognized his memory by naming the chair of Biblical literature and exegesis "the Sabato Morais professorship." In 1887 the University of Pennsylvania conferred upon him the honorary degree of Doctor of Laws, he being the first Jew so honored by that institution. Many of his papers are evidently held in that institution's library.

== His multifarious activity ==
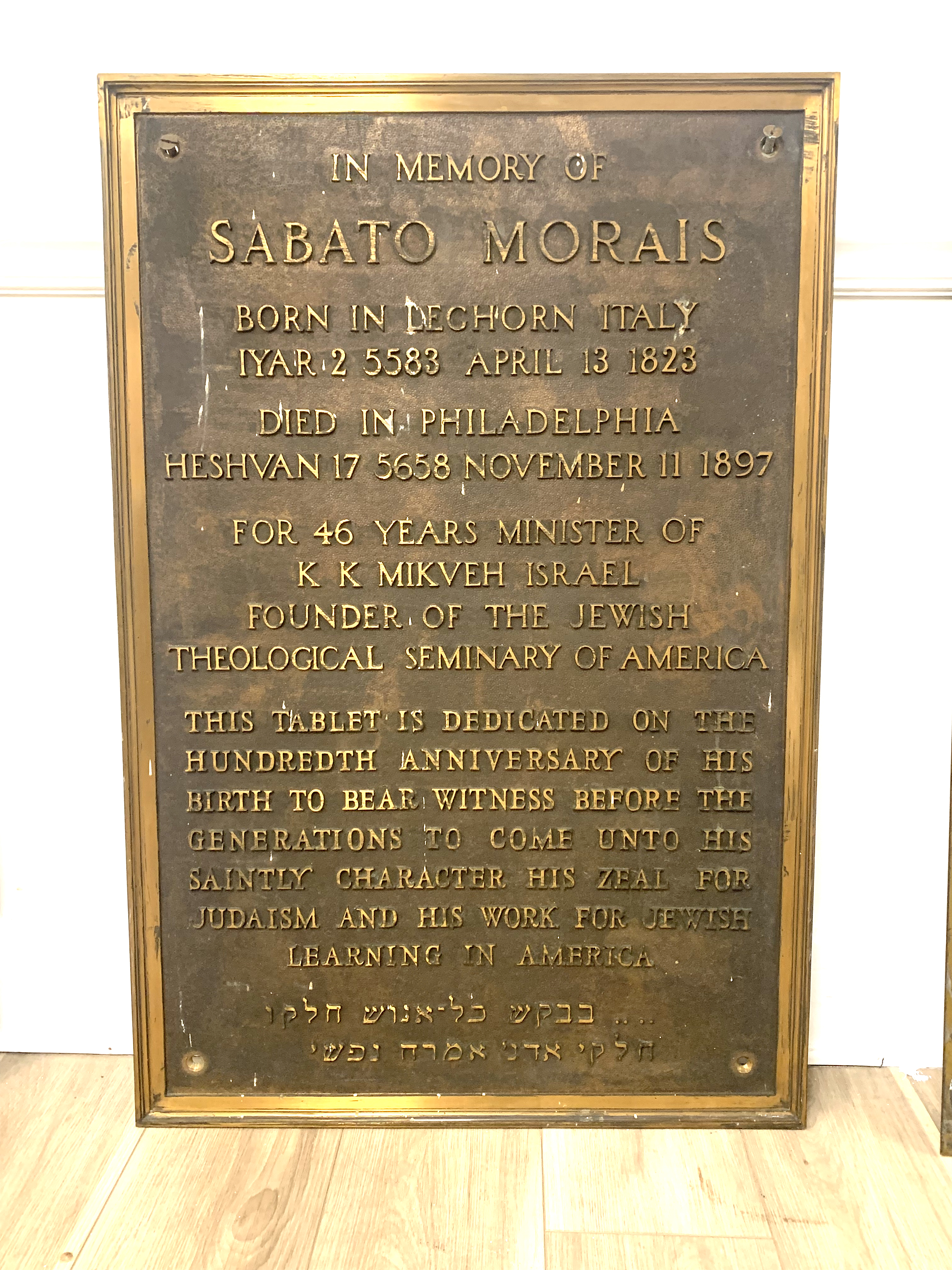
Mikveh Israel memorial plaque commemorating centenary of Morais' birth in 1923

In addition to his official positions, Morais was active in religious, educational, and charitable work. He was closely involved with the Hebrew Sunday-School Society, the Hebrew Education Society of Philadelphia, and the Young Men's Hebrew Association of Philadelphia. In his own home, he taught a small group of young men, including Isaac Husik, in Hebrew, Talmud, and Jewish history. His teaching is said to have influenced the character of his students and the wider community, though the specific nature of this influence on the community is unclear. His son, Henry Samuel Morais, was also a communal rabbi, serving at several congregations, including Mikve Israel, as well as congregations in New York and Rhode Island.

The strong conservatism of the Jews of Philadelphia and the warm interest in the higher things of Judaism evinced by the younger men of that city may be in a large measure directly traced to the influence of Sabato Morais. He was greatly interested in the Alliance Israélite Universelle, and was in constant correspondence with rabbis and scholars in Europe and the Orient. Through his friend Chevalier Emanuel Felice Veneziani, the almoner of Baron de Hirsch, he was enabled to secure timely aid for the agricultural colonies in New Jersey and was the representative of Baron de Hirsch in the Carmel Colony.

When the Russo-Jewish exodus began, in 1882, and Russian Jews in large numbers settled in Philadelphia, Morais immediately became their friend. Although unable to speak their language, his perfect familiarity with Hebrew as a living tongue gave him a ready means of communication. Among Gentiles also he was widely known and esteemed, and was very frequently called upon to address public assemblies.

Besides his sermons, he contributed to Jewish literature much in the form of addresses to various Jewish organizations and of theological, polemical, literary, and critical articles for the Jewish press at home and abroad. He wrote classic Hebrew in prose and in verse with ease and elegance.

In all his life, Morais maintained close (cultural, religious and political) ties with his motherland, Italy. His translations and essays in Italian Jewry made him the founding father of Italian Jewish Studies in America.

Among his later works are:

- A translation of the Prolegomena to a Grammar of the Hebrew Language, by S. D. Luzzatto (in Fifth Biennial Report of the Jewish Theological Seminary)
- An Essay on the Jew in Italy (in Second Biennial Report of the same)
- Italian Jewish Literature (in Publications of Gratz College, 1897)
- His translation of the Book of Jeremiah for the Bible of the Jewish Publication Society of America was completed shortly before his death, which occurred in Philadelphia on November 11, 1897.

Morais is interred in Mikveh Israel's Federal Street Burial Ground.

In April 1923, Congregation Mikveh Israel commemorated the centenary of Morais' birth with a special program at the synagogue featuring Dr. Cyrus Adler and Dr. Jacob da Silva Solis-Cohen as speakers.

== Bibliography ==
- Arthur Kiron (1999). "Golden ages, promised lands: The Victorian rabbinic humanism of Sabato Morais". Ph.D. Thesis. Columbia University. Archived from the original (PDF) on October 22, 2007.
- Kiron, Arthur (1992). "Sabato Morais Papers - Finding Aid". ARC MS8. Archived from the original on March 11, 2004.
- Kiron, Arthur (1996). "'Dust and ashes': The funeral and forgetting of Sabato Morais". American Jewish History. 84 (3): 155–188. doi:10.1353/ajh.1996.0038. S2CID 162106324.
- Adler, Cyrus; Sulzberger, Cyrus L. (1906). "Sabato Morais". Jewish Encyclopedia.
- The JE article cites the following works:
  - H.S. Morais, The Jews of Philadelphia, Philadelphia, 1894;
  - Memoir by H. S. Morais in Sixth Biennial Report of the Jewish Theological Seminary Association, New York, 1896.
