= Albert Gabbai =

Sephardic rabbi emeritus of the second-oldest synagogue in America

Rabbi Albert E. Gabbai
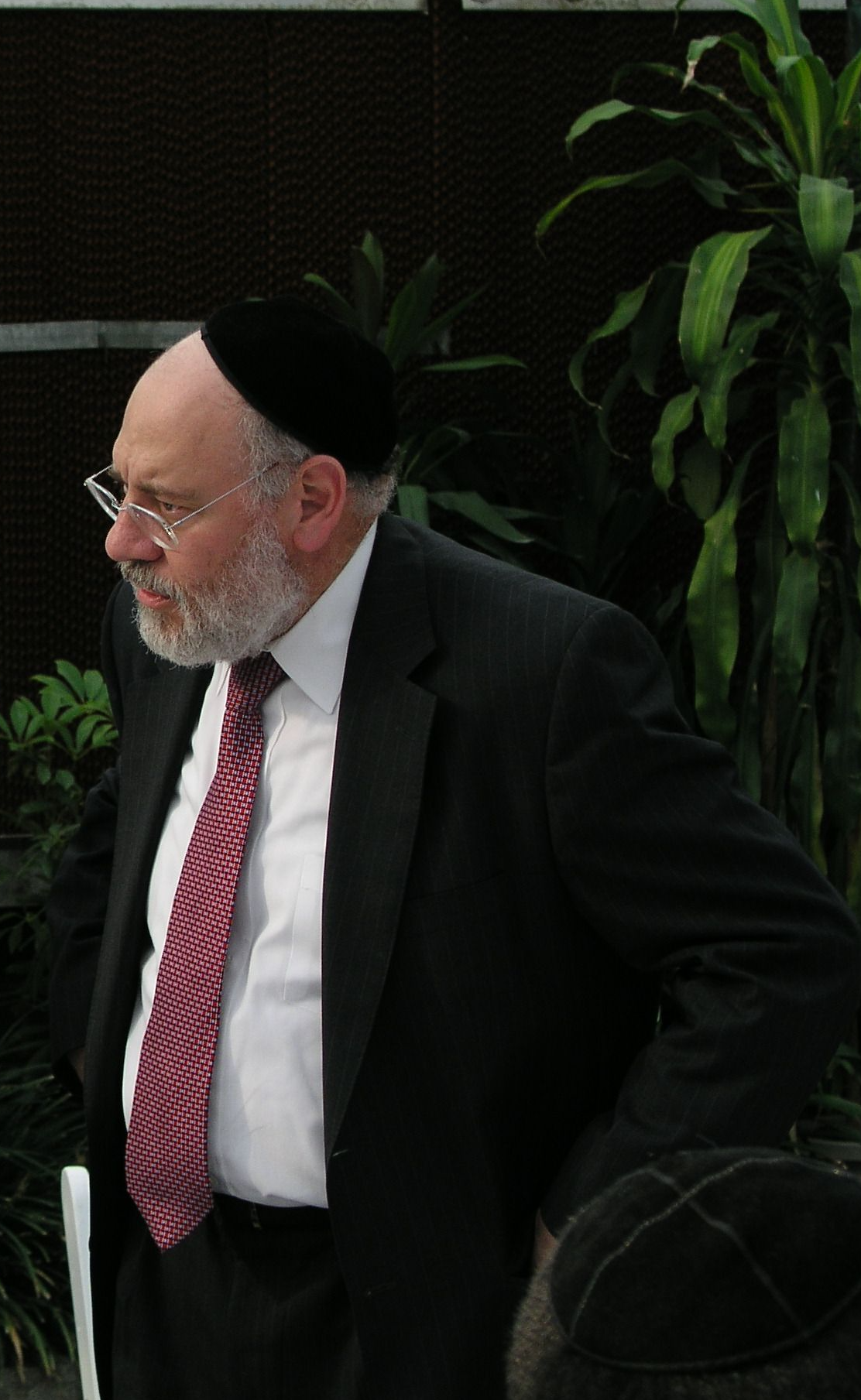

Personal life
- Born: Abraham Gabbai; 1949 (age 76–77) Cairo, Egypt
- Education: Yeshiva University
- Occupation: Rabbi

Religious life
- Religion: Judaism

Jewish leader
- Predecessor: Rabbi Joshua Toledano
- Position: Rabbi
- Synagogue: Congregation Mikveh Israel
- Began: 1988
- Residence: Philadelphia, Pennsylvania
- Semikhah: Shehebar Sephardic Center

Rabbi Albert E. (Abraham) Gabbai is an American rabbi, serving as the Rabbi Emeritus of the Sephardic synagogue Congregation Mikveh Israel since 1988. Mikveh Israel was founded in 1740, and is the second-oldest active congregation in the United States.

Gabbai is a native of Cairo, Egypt. Following the Six-Day War in 1967, Gabbai, who was 18 years old at the time, was arrested and sent to prison in Egypt for three years. After being released, he went to France and then to the United States.

== Early life and education ==
Gabbai was born in Egypt in 1949 to Jewish immigrant parents. His father was born in Baghdad to a family of rabbis. He came to Egypt as a child with his family, and traded in silk shirts. Gabbai's mother came from a family originally from Leghorn, Italy. They met and married in Egypt.

Gabbai's maternal grandmother was born in Salonica, Greece. Her family spoke Ladino.

There were ten children in the Gabbai family: eight boys and two girls. The family was strictly observant of Judaism.

Gabbai attended the Collège de la Salle, a French Catholic school. The majority of the students were Christians, but there were Jews and Moslems as well.

As a child, Gabbai sang in the choir of the Sha'ar Hashamayim Synagogue.

== Imprisonment in Egypt ==
Life in Egypt was generally good for Jews up until the 40s and 50s. The situation became more strenuous until, eventually, the Jews started to leave and immigrate to other countries. Gabbai's four brothers left before 1967 and went to the USA, where they became US citizens. Gabbai, three brothers, two sisters, and their widowed mother stayed behind. Their father had died years earlier.

In 1967, Gabbai was 18 years old and in high school. He and the rest of the family were awaiting visas to be permitted to leave Egypt when the Six-Day War broke out.

After the war broke out, and before they could leave, Gabbai and his three brothers were rounded up by the secret service and put in prison camps. First, they took two of his older brothers in June 1967, and a few weeks later, they came back for him and another brother. There was no due process, no charges, no trial, and no right to an attorney. They remained in prison until June 1970.

According to Gabbai, the cells were made for 30, 40 people, but held 70 in each at the time. In the beginning, they were in a prison camp in Abu Zaabal for six months, and it was horrible. He and his brothers feared that they were going to be killed, and their mother was told they were dead. After six months, they were taken to a prison camp in Tora where it became more relaxed. Since his family was strictly observant, they only ate vegetables. Eventually, the women and children were allowed to visit, and so his mother brought him kosher meat and chicken.

== Release and immigration to the United States ==
In June 1970, due to external pressure, they were let go. They were taken from the prison camp directly to the airport, leaving them no time to stop at home to collect their possessions. They were flown to Paris, and their mother, wives, and children followed a few weeks later.

In Paris, Gabbai met his family and applied for refugee status to come to the United States. After about a year, Gabbai arrived in New York City in 1971.

Gabbai insists that because of his great suffering there, he will never go back to Egypt, even to visit.

== Later education and rabbinical career ==
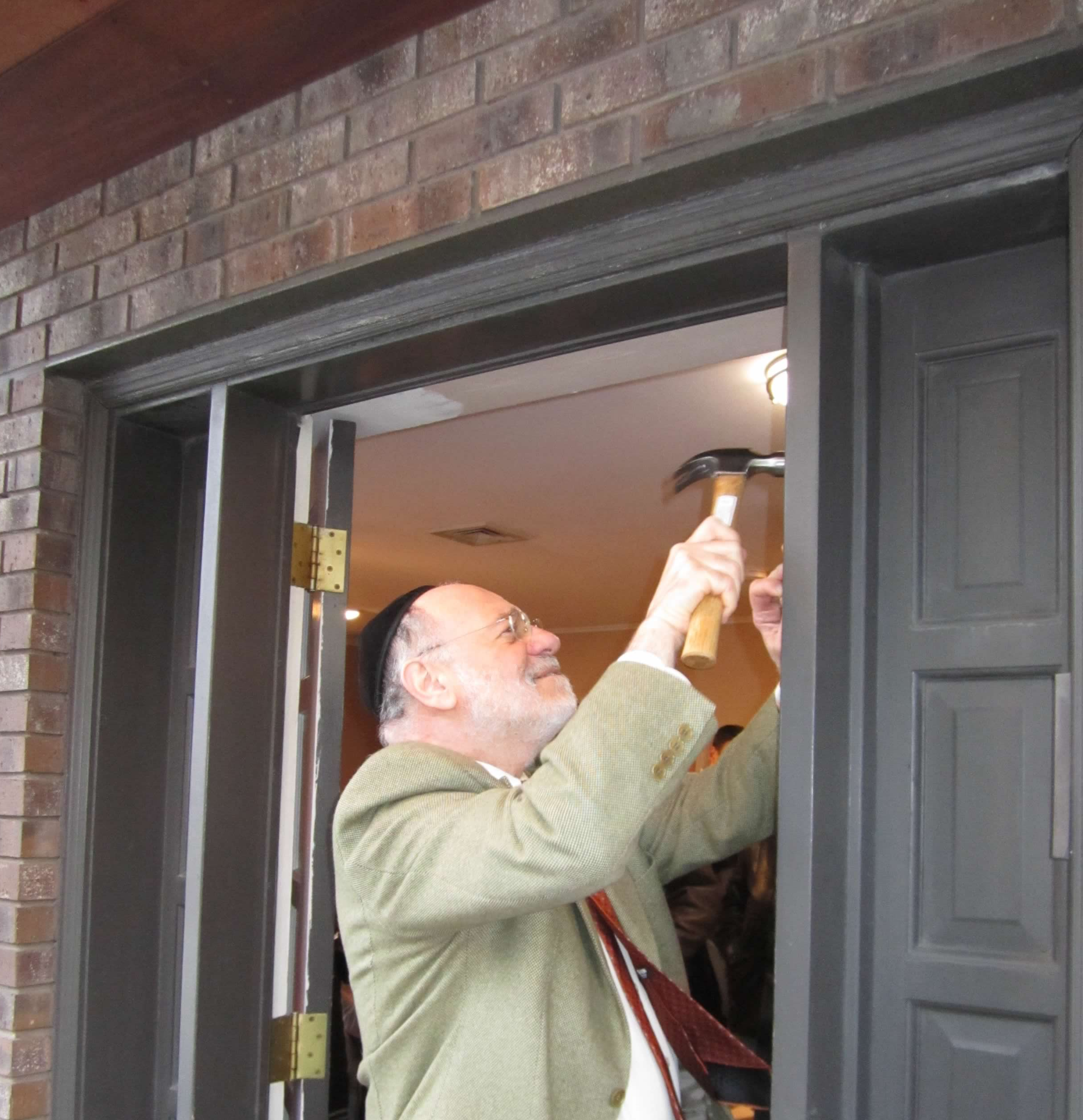
Rabbi Albert Gabbai affixes the mezuzah at a Hanukat HaBayait in Philadelphia (March 2011).

In New York Gabbai attended Yeshiva University.

From 1983 to 1986, Gabbai was the assistant hazzan of Congregation Shearith Israel in New York. Congregation Shearith Israel is a Spanish and Portuguese synagogue. It is the oldest Jewish congregation in the United States.

Gabbai then traveled to Jerusalem to the Shehebar Sephardic Center under Rabbi Sam Kassin to be ordained a rabbi in the Sephardic tradition. He graduated SSC in 1989.

Gabbai is also a spiritual and musical student of Rabbi Abraham Lopes Cardozo.

Since 1988, Gabbai has been the rabbi of the Spanish-Portuguese Congregation Mikveh Israel in Philadelphia. Rabbi Yosef Zarnighian came to Mikveh Israel as Assistant Rabbi in 2021, where he trained under Gabbai's tutelage and succeeded him in 2023. Rabbi Gabbai was named Rabbi Emeritus in 2023 and remains active in both the congregation and community.

Gabbai is fluent in more than six languages. He is a member of the Board of Governors of Gratz College.

== Writings and recordings ==
=== Writings ===
- A Land of Promise - for the National Museum of American Jewish History
- Time is in Our Hands - Passover Devar Torah
- Is the menu of the Shabbat meals affected on the preceding Shabbat of Tish'a Be'Ab? - Halachic discussion

=== Recordings ===
==== Speeches ====
- Mikveh Israel of Philadelphia 2013 Shabbaton
- Salute to Our Veterans- at Mikveh Israel Synagogue in Philadelphia, PA
- Remarks to SHIN DC & Embassy of Morocco for Mimouna Mimosa Brunch 2018
- Congregation Mikveh Israel Annual Gala
- Unveiling Portrait of Rabbi Leon H. Elmaleh at Congregation Mikveh Israel

==== Lessons ====
- Video series explaining the Torah reading service on Shabbat Morning according to the Spanish and Portuguese custom: Part one, Part two, Part three, Part four

==== Prayers ====
- Shema Yisrael
- Achot Ketanah - Rosh Hashanah
- Mizmor le-David - Spanish-Portuguese tradition
- En Kelohenu
- Yimloch - Yom Kippur
- Shabbat Musaf
- Ana Bekor’enu - Kal Nidre - Yom Kippur
- Addir Vena’or - Kal Nidre - Yom Kippur
- Lema’ankha Elohay - Yom Kippur
- Yah Shema Ebyonekha - Yom Kippur
- El Melekh Yosheb - Yom Kippur
- Hatanu Tsurenu - Yom Kippur
- Anenu - Adon Heseli’hot - Yom Kippur
- Portions for Women’s Service - Rosh Hodesh

=== Opinions ===
- With measles cases still rising, what religion has to say about vaccination
- Differing Jewish Views on Valentine’s Day
- Rabbis Discuss Jewish View of Capital Punishment
- Moral Relativism and Cantors

== In the news ==
- Congregation Mikveh Israel Fundraises to Repair Historic Cemetery
- Elena Kagan is featured speaker at Touro SYNAGOGUE
- Thanksgiving And Hanukkah To Share The Same Date
- Area Jews Prepare For Annual Hanukah Celebration
- Jewish Community Responds to Deadly Mosque Attack
- The Converso Comeback - Hispanic crypto-Jews use social media and DNA testing to reconnect with their heritage
- Extra Room for Historic Transition
- Washington's First Letter to Jews Is Lost

== See also ==
- Congregation Mikveh Israel
- Congregation Shearith Israel
- Oldest synagogues in the United States
- Jewish exodus from Arab and Muslim countries
- 1956–57 exodus and expulsions from Egypt
