= Isaac Husik =

Jewish historian, translator, and student of philosophy

Portrait of Isaac Husik

Isaac Husik (Hebrew: יצחק הוזיק) (10 February 1876 – 22 March 1939) was a Jewish historian, translator, and student of philosophy, one of the first three individuals to serve as official faculty at Gratz College in Philadelphia.

== Biography ==
Husik was born in Vasseutinez near Kyiv, Russian Empire, on 10 February 1876. Because of the worsening climate under the Russian imperial May Laws, in 1888, when he was 12 years old, he moved with his mother to Philadelphia. His father, the teacher Wolf Husik, rejoined them the following year. Isaac received his early instruction from his father and from Sabato Morais, rabbi at the Sephardic congregation Kahal Kadosh Mikveh Israel in Philadelphia, and one of the founders of the Jewish Theological Seminary (JTS). Husik attended JTS while preparing for secular studies, and received direct guidance from Morais, but did not ultimately pursue a rabbinical career.

Husik attended Central High School (Philadelphia), and then enrolled at the University of Pennsylvania, where he received a master's degree in mathematics in 1899. Ultimately, however, his interests turned to the study of the classics, especially Aristotle, and he received his Ph.D. in philosophy from the University of Pennsylvania in 1903. His thesis, entitled Judah Messer Leon's Commentary on the Vetus Logica, was published in Leyden in 1906.

While still a student at Penn, Husik accepted an Instructorship in Hebrew and Bible at Gratz College, but simultaneously remained an instructor in philosophy at Penn. He eventually left Gratz, and was appointed full professor of philosophy at Penn in 1922. He taught classes also at Yeshiva College, Hebrew Union College, and Columbia University Summer School.

In 1923, Husik was appointed editor of the Jewish Publication Society of America, in which capacity he served until his death. He additionally served in a wide range of voluntary communal positions, and married Rose Gorfine late in life. He died suddenly at the age of 63. The philosopher Leo Strauss called him in his "Preface to Isaac Husik, Philosophical Essays: Ancient, Medieval, and Modern" (1952): "one of the most distinguished historians of philosophy America had produced".

== Works ==
Husik's best known work is A History of Mediaeval Jewish Philosophy (Jewish Publication Society, 1916, and several times thereafter), which was considered at the time to be a pioneering effort in English-language scholarship. Like Julius Guttmann's Philosophies of Judaism, Husik's book offers rather thin treatment of mystical topics and thinkers, instead favoring the rational face of Jewish thought. Husik had extensive knowledge of Hebrew, Arabic, German, and Greek, and relied heavily on primary sources in these languages when available.

A History of Mediaeval Jewish Philosophy discusses the philosophies of the following individuals:

- Isaac Israeli
- David ben Merwan al-Mukkamas
- Saadia ben Joseph al-Fayyumi
- Joseph al-Basir
- Joshua ben Judah
- Solomon ibn Gabirol
- Bahya ibn Pakuda
- Pseudo-Bahya
- Abraham bar Hiyya
- Joseph ibn Zaddik
- Judah Halevi
- Moses ibn Ezra
- Abraham ibn Ezra
- Abraham ibn Daud
- Moses Maimonides
- Hillel ben Samuel
- Levi ben Gerson
- Aaron ben Elijah of Nicomedia
- Hasdai ben Abraham Crescas
- Joseph Albo

Among Husik's other works are a translation of Joseph Albo's Book of Principles (ספר העקרים) in five volumes, which restores many passages removed by Christian censors, a translation of von Ihering's Law as a Means to an End (Zweck im Recht), and a translation of Rudolf Stammler's The Theory of Justice.
