= Benzion Halper =

Lithuanian-American Hebraist and Arabist (1884–1924)

Benzion Halper (April 15, 1884 – March 21, 1924) was a Lithuanian-born Jewish-American Hebraist and Arabist.

== Life ==
Halper was born on April 15, 1884, in Žasliai, the Vilna Governorate, Russia, the son of Abel Solomon Halper and Miriam Rosenbloom.

Halper received a Heder and Yeshiva education, and he began working when he was sixteen. He immigrated to Frankfurt, Germany, to continue his studies in 1901. He left for England shortly afterwards, where he worked as a carpenter, a commercial traveller and in a Manchester factory. In 1904, he matriculated at the University of London and supported himself by teaching privately and writing for the Hebrew weekly Hayehudi. He received an A.B. degree from there in 1904 (with first class honors in Semitics) and an M.A. in 1909 (with mark of distinction). In 1910, he was elected the first Gilchrist Scholar in Arabic and spent the next year studying in Egypt under the auspices of the university. He also studied in Jews' College.

Halper immigrated to America in 1911, at which point Solomon Schechter had him classify and copy the Cairo Geniza fragments in the Jewish Theological Seminary Library. He became a Fellow of Dropsie College in Philadelphia, Pennsylvania, in the fall of 1912. There, Cyrus Adler had him examine a collection of Geniza fragments. Two months later, he revealed a previously overlooked lost work: three quarters of Sefer Ha-Mitzvot (Book of Precepts) by Hefes ben Yasliah in Arabic, which he then translated into Hebrew in June 1913. He received a Doctor of Philosophy degree from Dropsie in 1914, at which point he became an Instructor and then an Associate Professor as well as Custodian of Manuscripts. His two-volume Post-Biblical Hebrew Literature was published in 1921. He also wrote Descriptive Catalogue of Genizah Fragments in Philadelphia, which represented nearly twelve years of research of every Geniza fragment he could find in Philadelphia and was rushed to the press when he fell ill so it would be published before he died. He also published an Autograph Responsum of Maimonides, wrote reviews of Arabic literature, Hebraica, and Judaica in the Jewish Quarterly Review, and issued an essay on the Scansion of Medieval Hebrew Poetry. He was working on an edition of Arabic Responsa of Maimonides based on a manuscript David Simonsen sent him before he died, as well as an edition and Hebrew translation of Moses Ibn Ezra's Arabic poetica and an article in Hebrew on Judeo-Arabic literature. He was also an editor of the Jewish Publication Society of America from 1916 until his death.

Halper died at home from pneumonia on March 21, 1924. Rabbi Leon H. Elmaleh of Congregation Mikveh Israel officiated his funeral service at Dropsie College. He was buried in the Federal Street Burial Ground.
