= Barnard Gratz =

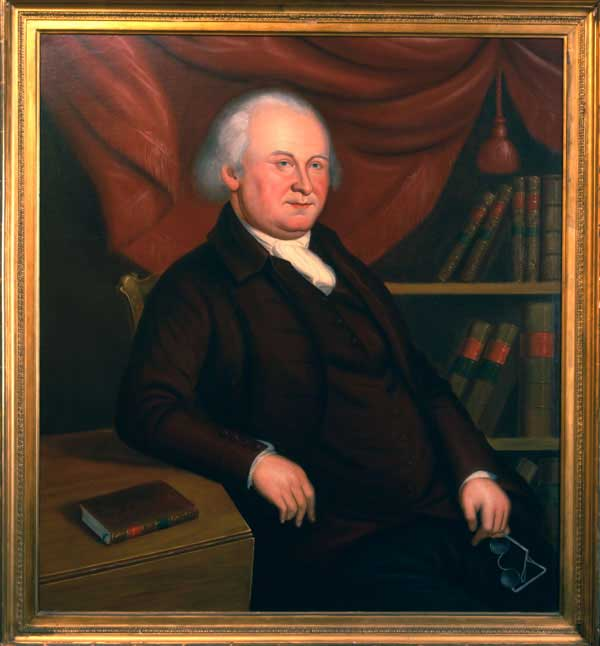
- Portrait of Barnard Gratz painted by Charles Peale Polk, c. 1792
- Born: 1738; Langendorf, Upper Silesia, Prussia
- Died: April 20, 1801 (aged 62–63); Baltimore, Maryland
- Occupations: Merchant, trader
- Known for: Co-founder of Congregation Mikveh Israel
- Spouse: Richea Myers‐Cohen
- Children: Frances (died in infancy), Rachel

Barnard Gratz (1738 – 20 April 1801) was an American merchant and one of the founders of the Jewish community of Philadelphia.

== Early life ==
Barnard Gratz was born Issachar Ber in 1738 in Langendorf, Upper Silesia, Prussia (today Wielowieś, Poland). Barnard and his brother Michael were the two youngest of six children. In the 1740s, Barnard's parents Shlomo Zalman Gratz and his wife died, leaving Barnard and Michael to be raised by their older siblings. Due to decreased economic opportunities for Jews in the region, members of the extended family left Langendorf for Western Europe. Solomon Henry, Barnard's cousin, moved to London in the 1740s and set up a mercantile business. Gratz left Langendorf himself in 1748, traveling through Holland to get to London. When Gratz arrived in London in 1750, began working for his cousin's business.

== Coming to America ==
Solomon Henry kept in correspondence with a Jewish trader in Philadelphia named David Franks, the co-owner of trading company Levy & Franks. Solomon's brother Jacob Henry worked as a clerk for Franks at Levy & Franks. When Jacob had earned enough to start a business of his own, Solomon arranged with David Franks for Barnard to take over Jacob's job as his clerk.

Gratz arrived in Philadelphia in 1754 and worked as a clerk for Franks for five years. In 1759 Gratz started his own business in Philadelphia and convinced his brother Michael to join him in North America. The Gratz brothers built a local business called B & M Gratz in 1768 and worked closely with Franks, the Henry's in London, and Joseph Simon in Lancaster.

However, one of their most important business partnerships was with George Croghan and William Trent, fur traders who traded with indigenous peoples in the western part of the Province of Pennsylvania.

During the American Revolution, Gratz supported the cause of the American colonists. Gratz signed on to Non-importation agreements in Philadelphia in 1765 and took an Oath of Allegiance to the Commonwealth of Pennsylvania in 1777.

=== Jewish life in Philadelphia ===
The Jewish community in Philadelphia when Barnard arrived in 1754 was small, but growing. Barnard was a community leader within the Jewish community, serving as one of the co-founders and the first parnas/president of Kahal Kodesh Mikveh Israel, the first synagogue in Philadelphia. Gratz was also one of several Jewish community leaders to protest the law in Pennsylvania that restricted political office to Christians.

== Personal life ==
Bernard Gratz married Richea Myers‐Cohen, a cousin of his friend Jonathan Simon's wife, in 1760. Their first child Fanny died as an infant and Myers-Cohen herself died while giving birth to the couple's second child, Rachel. While Gratz never remarried, his brother and sister-in-law helped raise Rachel. Rachel would later marry Solomon Etting of Baltimore and leave Philadelphia.

On April 20, 1801, while visiting Rachel in Baltimore, Gratz died.

== Legacy ==
In addition to his position as a founder of Mikveh Israel and one of the first Jewish leaders in Philadelphia, Barnard Gratz was part of Philadelphia's social circle in the late 1700s. A noted philanthropist, Gratz and his brother donated to the "Pennsylvania Academy of Fine Arts, the Athenaeum of Philadelphia, and the Pennsylvania Institution for the Deaf and Dumb". The Gratz brothers also provided key investments for infrastructure in the early years of the United States.

The Gratz family continued to be an important part of the social fabric of Philadelphia, with later members of the family founding the Philadelphia Orphan Society, and the Hebrew Education Society of Philadelphia, and Gratz College.
