= Edward Carey =

Edward Carey may refer to:

- Edward Carey (businessman) (1832–1908), Canadian businessman and politician.
- Edward Carey (novelist) (born 1970), English playwright, and novelist
- Edward L. Carey (1805–1845), American publisher and aesthete
- Edward M. Carey (1916–2002), American oil industry executive
- Edward P. Carey, known as Ned Carey, American politician
- Edward Carey (MP), English member of parliament for Scarborough
- Edward Macdonald Carey (1913–1994), American actor
- Eddie Carey (born 1960), American sprinter
- Edward Cary (died 1618), or Carey, English courtier
