= Henry Samuel Morais =

American writer and rabbi (1860–1935)

- Born: May 13, 1860; Philadelphia, Pennsylvania, U.S.
- Died: September 21, 1935 (aged 75); New York City, New York, U.S.
- Father: Sabato Morais

Henry Samuel Morais (May 13, 1860 – September 21, 1935) was an American writer and rabbi.

== Biography ==
Henry Samuel Morais was born on May 13, 1860, in Philadelphia, Pennsylvania, and educated at private and public schools of that city. He received his religious instruction from his father, Sabato Morais. For about twelve years he was a teacher in the schools of the Hebrew Education Society and in the Hebrew Sabbath-schools of Philadelphia. Morais was the principal founder and for the first two years managing editor of the Jewish Exponent. He edited also The Musical and Dramatic Standard (Philadelphia) and The Hebrew Watchword and Instructor, and was a frequent contributor to the Jewish and general press of the United States; he was on the reportorial and special staff of the Philadelphia Public Ledger almost four years.

Morais was acting minister of the Congregation Mikveh Israel in Philadelphia (1897–98) and minister of the Adath Yeshurun congregation, Syracuse, New York (1899–1900 and again 1902–03), and of the Jeshuat Israel congregation at Newport, R.I. from 1900 to 1901. He is the author of: Eminent Israelites of the Nineteenth Century, Philadelphia, 1880 and The Jews of Philadelphia, 1894, the most important local history of the Jews in America as of 1906. Morais died in New York City on September 21, 1935 at the age of 75.
