= Abraham Hart =

American businessman

- Born: December 15, 1810; Philadelphia, Pennsylvania
- Died: July 22, 1885 (aged 74); Long Branch, New Jersey
- Burial place: Mikveh Israel Cemetery (Federal Street Burial Ground)
- Spouse: Rebecca Cohen Isaacks

Abraham Hart (December 15, 1810 in Philadelphia, Pennsylvania– July 22, 1885 in Long Branch, New Jersey) was a United States publisher and a member of the noted firm of Carey & Hart.

== Biography ==
He was of Dutch parentage. As a boy, he was taken into the employ of the publishing firm of Carey, Lea & Carey. In 1829 the firm divided its business, and a partnership was formed between Hart and Edward L. Carey, the junior member of the old firm. This house of Carey & Hart became the best known publishing house in the United States. It was the first to collect the fugitive essays of Macaulay, Jeffrey, Mackintosh, Carlyle, and others and publish them in separate volumes. Carey died in 1845, and Hart continued the publishing business until 1854, when he retired.

After retiring from the publishing business, he involved himself with industrial enterprises, serving in an executive capacity at the Centennial Button-hole Machine Company and the American Button-hole Machine Company. Hart was an active member of the Jewish community in Philadelphia, being president for a time of the Jewish Congregation Mickvéh Israel, and assisting in Jewish educational and charitable enterprises. He was president of the board of trustees of Maimonides College, the first (albeit short-lived) rabbinical seminary in the United States.

In 1831, he married Rebecca Cohen Isaacks. He died in 1885 and is interred in the Mikveh Israel Cemetery (11th and Federal) in South Philadelphia.
