= Congregation Mikveh Israel =

Synagogue in Philadelphia

Kahal Kadosh Mikveh Israel
- Hebrew: קהל קדוש מקוה ישראל
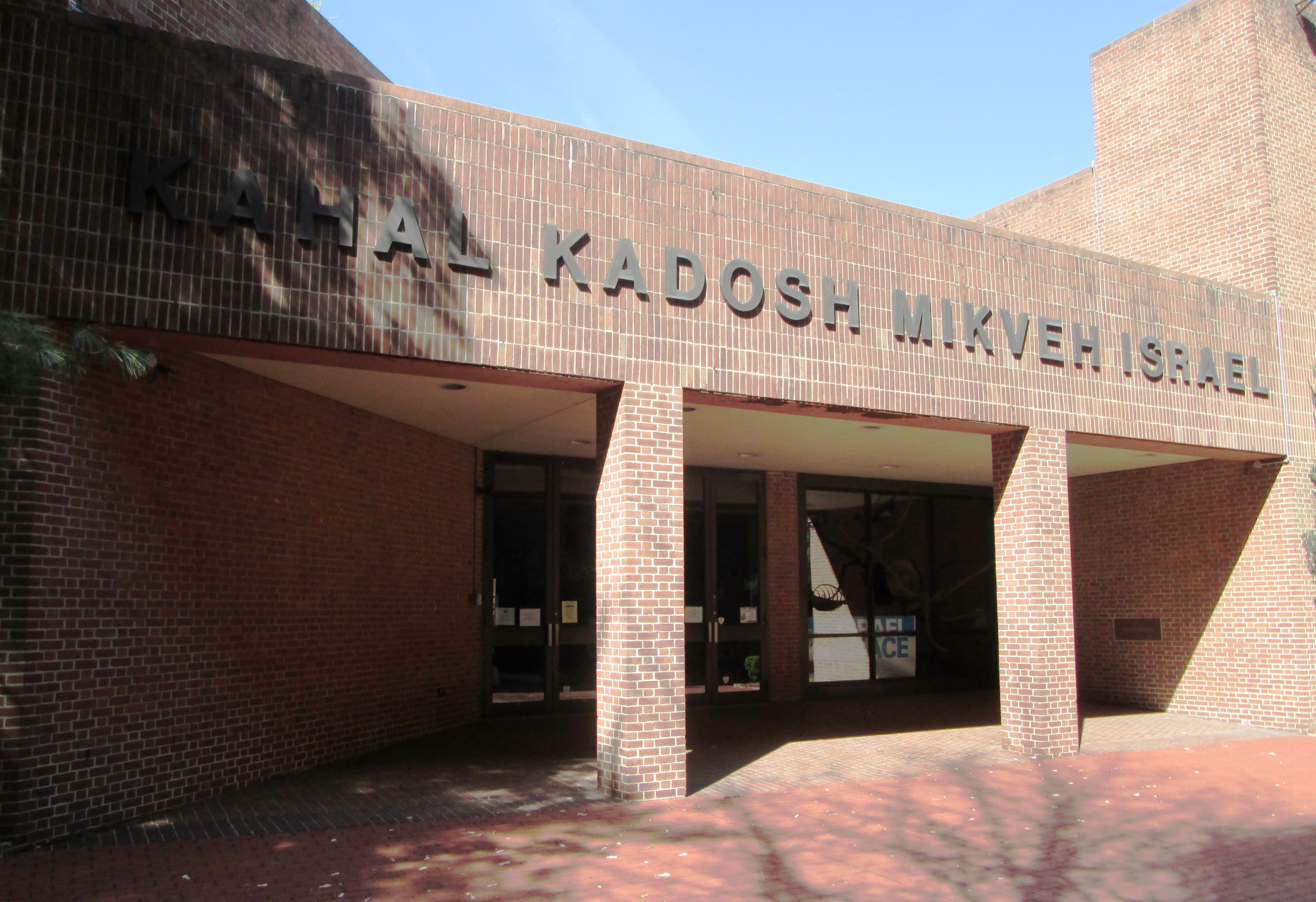
- Mikveh Israel in 2013

- Location in Philadelphia

Religion
- Affiliation: Orthodox Judaism
- Rite: Sephardic Spanish and Portuguese
- Ecclesiastical or organisational status: Synagogue
- Leadership: Rabbi Emeritus Albert Gabbai; Rabbi Yosef Zarnighian
- Status: Active

Location
- Location: 44 North Fourth Street, Philadelphia, Pennsylvania
- Country: United States
- Coordinates: 39°56′57″N 75°08′51″W

Architecture
- Established: 1773 (as a chartered congregation)
- Completed: 1761 (Sterling Alley); 1782 (Third and Cherry Sts #1); 1825 (Third and Cherry Sts #2); 1860 (N 7th St); 1909 (Broad and York Sts); 1976 (44 N Fourth St)

Website
- mikvehisrael.org

Congregation Mikveh Israel (Hebrew: קהל קדוש מקוה ישראל, lit. 'Holy Community Hope of Israel'), is a Sephardic Orthodox Jewish synagogue located at 44 North Fourth Street in Philadelphia, Pennsylvania, in the United States. The congregation traces its history from 1740. Mikveh Israel is a Spanish and Portuguese congregation that follows the rite of the Amsterdam esnoga. It is the oldest synagogue in Philadelphia, and the longest running in the United States.

The congregation moved to its current building at 44 North Fourth Street in 1976. The synagogue is located within Philadelphia's Old City Historic District and adjacent to Independence Mall. Mikveh Israel is an active community synagogue with services on the Sabbath, holy days, and special occasions. It offers adult education and cultural programming with a focus on the Spanish and Portuguese tradition and history. It is active within the Center City Jewish community and its kitchen is under the kosher supervision of the Community Kashrus of Greater Philadelphia The Keystone K.

Rabbi Emeritus Albert Gabbai led the congregation from 1988 to 2023. Rabbi Yosef Zarnighian came to the synagogue as Assistant Rabbi in September 2021 and succeeded Rabbi Gabbai in 2023.

== Burial ground and founding, 1740–1782 ==
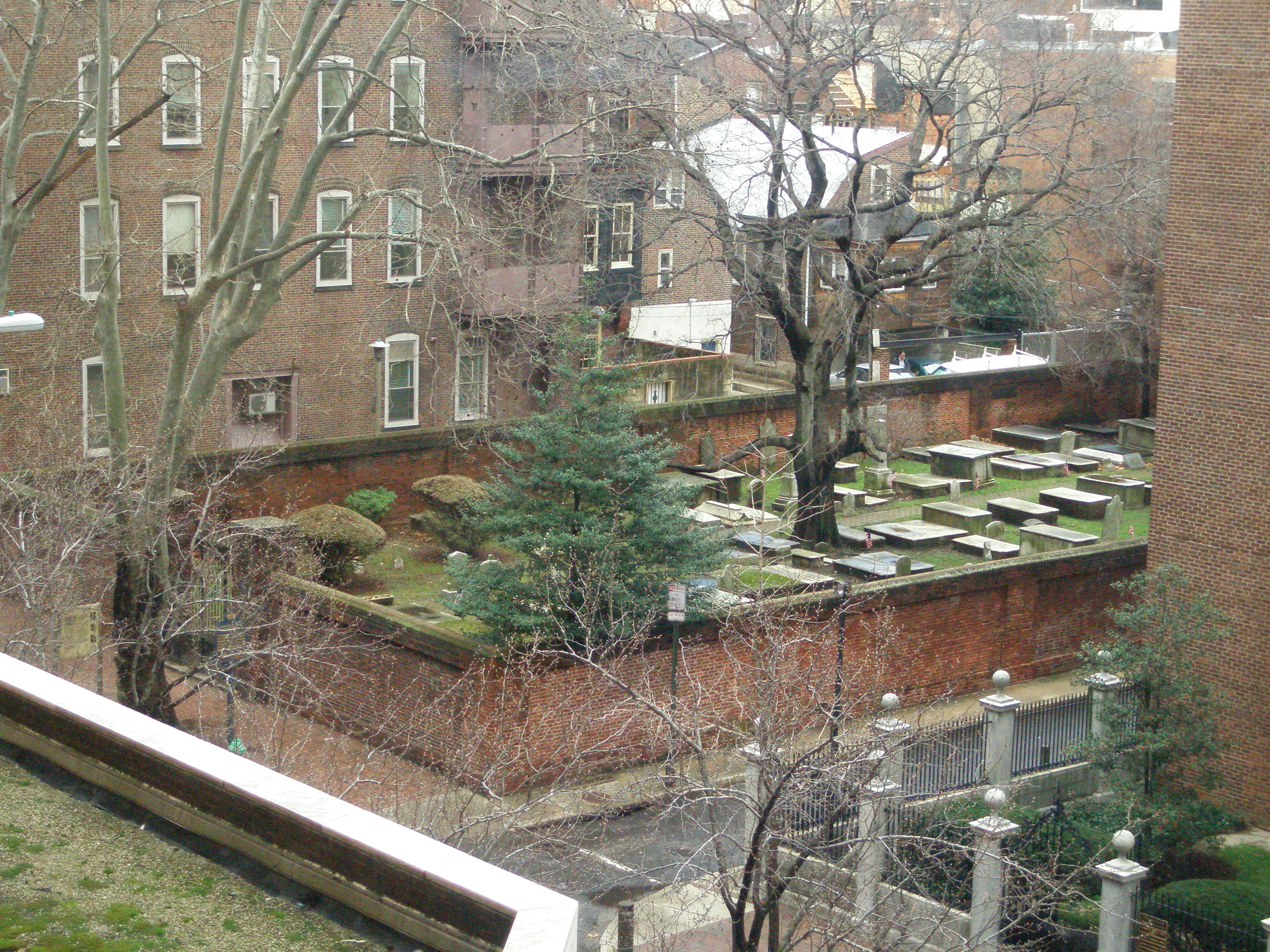
Mikveh Israel Cemetery (2007)

Nathan Levy was a Jewish merchant in Philadelphia when one of his children died in 1738. Desiring a dedicated place for burial, he applied to John Penn, Pennsylvania's colonial proprietor, for "a small piece of ground" with permission to make it a family cemetery. This property was at the corner of 9th and Walnut Streets, the present site of the Walnut Street Theatre.

Congregation Mikveh Israel traces its history to September 25, 1740, when the Province of Pennsylvania and Thomas Penn authorized the burial ground at the north-west corner of Spruce Street and South Darien Street (between 8th and 9th Streets) meant to be a permanent burial ground for the entire Jewish community of Philadelphia. Levy was buried there upon his death in 1753. This burial ground became the Mikveh Israel Cemetery.

Jews in Philadelphia in the 1740s and 1750s organized themselves informally for services. In 1761 they acquired a Torah scroll and met in a private residence on Sterling Alley, then between Cherry and Race Streets and Third and Fourth Streets. The congregation moved to a rented building on Cherry Street and held their first Sabbath services on July 25, 1771. The group chartered itself as an organization in 1773.

It is estimated that in 1775, the city of Philadelphia had a population of approximately 35,000 of whom 300 were Jewish. Mikveh Israel counted among its members revolutionary patriots including Jonas Phillips, the Gratz family, and Haym Solomon who financed the war.

Gershom Mendes Seixas (1745–1816) was minister of Congregation Shearith Israel in Manhattan when the British occupied New York City during the Revolutionary War in 1776. Seixas closed the synagogue and left the city rather than align with the British. He moved first to Connecticut and then to Philadelphia where he led Mikveh Israel.

== Third and Cherry Streets, 1782–1825 ==
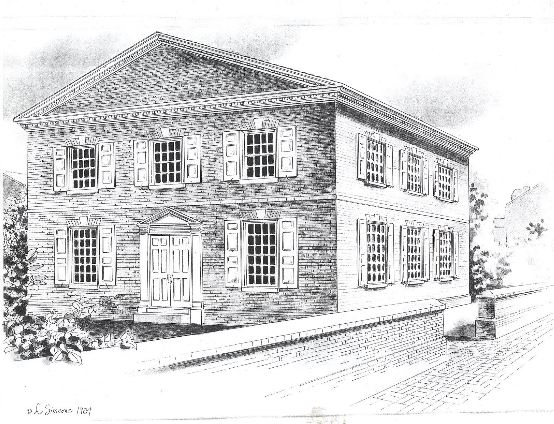
3rd and Cherry Streets (1782)

Mikveh Israel built its first synagogue in 1782 at Third and Cherry Streets. Its initial location was moved after protest that its proposed site next to a church would offend the Dutch Reform Protestant congregants. Prominent Philadelphians including Benjamin Franklin and Robert Morris contributed to its building fund along with local merchant and synagogue member Ephraim Hart who would later organize the Board of Stock-Brokers.

In September 1782, the congregation dedicated the new building on Cherry Street near Third Street. The building seated 200 persons and had accommodations for the clergy adjoining it. At the dedication, Seixas invoked heaven's blessing upon "the members of these states in Congress assembled and on His Excellency George Washington, commander general of these Colonies."

Manuel Josephson (1729–1796) had also come to Mikveh Israel from New York in 1776. Josephson petitioned the synagogue board to build a mikveh in 1784 and by 1786 it was open under Johnson's organization.

Seixas returned to New York in 1784 and Mikveh Israel invited his replacement at Shearith Israel, Jacob Raphael Cohen (1738–1811) to Philadelphia in Seixas' place. Cohen served at Mikveh Israel from 1784 until his death in September 1811. Cohen officially participated in the parade which honored ratification of the Constitution of the United States on July 4, 1788, in Philadelphia.

Cohen was replaced in 1814 by Emanuel Nunes Carvalho (1771–1817) who had emigrated from Britain to Barbados to Charleston, South Carolina before being called to Mikveh Israel. Carvalho published A Key to the Hebrew Tongue (Philadelphia, 1815) and his A Sermon, preached on Sunday, July 7, 1816, on Occasion of the Death of the Rev. Mr. Gershom Mendes Seixas (Philadelphia, 1816) became the first Jewish sermon printed in the United States. Cohen served until his death in 1817. Abraham Israel Keys (1780–1828) served as minister from 1824 to 1828.

== Third and Cherry Streets, 1825–1860 ==
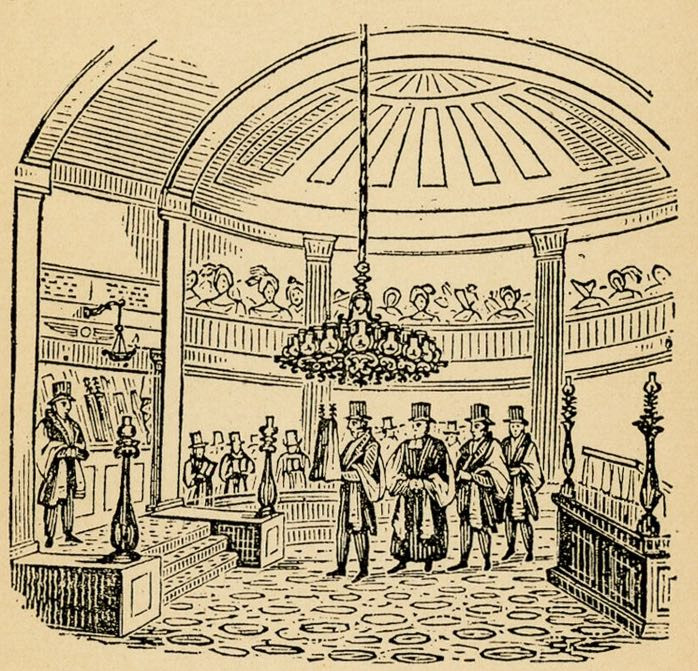
Cherry Street building sanctuary (1825)

The congregation laid the cornerstone for its second building on September 26, 1822, at the same Cherry Street location. A copy of the U.S. Constitution, the constitutions of several states, and American coinage were placed in the cornerstone. William Strickland designed the Egyptian Revival synagogue, the first of its kind in the United States. A contemporary account reads that "the galleries are semi-circular, extending around the north and south of the building, and are supported by the columns which extend to the dome." The new building was dedicated on January 21, 1825 and attended by William White, the Episcopal bishop of Pennsylvania, William Tilghman, chief justice of the Pennsylvania Supreme Court, as well as ministers from other Christian churches.

In 1829, Isaac Leeser (1806–1868) became the synagogue's leader and held that position until 1850. Leeser was one of a small number of rabbis who defended orthodox practices against the growth of Reform Judaism in the mid-nineteenth century United States.

Mikveh Israel established its second cemetery in 1849 in South Philadelphia in what was then outside the city's southern limits. The second Mikveh Israel Cemetery (11th and Federal) is located at 1114 Federal Street and now known as the Federal Street Burial Grounds and Mikveh Israel Cemetery #2. A Pennsylvania Historic marker was added in March 2009.

Sabato Morais (1823–1897) succeeded Leeser as Mikveh Israel's minister in 1851.

== 117 N Seventh Street, 1860–1909 ==
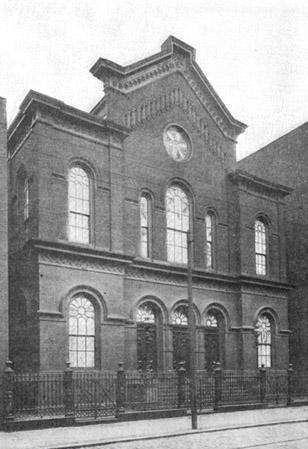
117 N 7th Street (1901)

The Cherry Street synagogue was replaced in 1860 by a building at 117 N 7th Street designed by architect John McArthur Jr. who would later design Philadelphia City Hall. The cornerstone was laid on May 9, 1859; the honor of placing the cornerstone was auctioned at the synagogue on Cherry St on the previous day, May 8, 1859.

Sabato Morais served as minister at Mikveh Israel for forty-six years from 1851 to 1897. He was an opponent of slavery prior to the Civil War and encouraged the creation of the Ladies' Hebrew Association for the Relief of Sick and Wounded Union Soldiers in May 1863. Morais admired Abraham Lincoln and authored a sermon and prayer on the death of Lincoln's son Willie Lincoln in 1862; delivered a public sermon four days after Lincoln's death in April 1865; and delivered another public sermon on June 1, 1865, the national day of mourning. Later in June 1865, Morais sent a donation of $300 collected from Mikveh Israel members for the construction of the Lincoln Memorial.

Upon Lincoln's death, the synagogue trustees convened a special meeting on April 16, 1865, and issued a statement lamenting the president's "traitorous" assassination and declared that the synagogue would be draped in public mourning for a period of 30-days.

Morais' son Henry Samuel Morais taught in the synagogue's Hebrew school program, was a principal founder of the Jewish Exponent newspaper in 1887, and served as acting minister of the congregation from his father's death in 1897 through 1898.

Kahal Kadosh Beth El Emeth had been founded in 1857 as a pulpit for Rev. Leeser following Leeser's departure from Mikveh Israel. Beth-El-Emeth dedicated a cemetery at 55th and Market Streets in 1857. Beth El Emeth dissolved in 1897 and many of its members joined Mikveh Israel. Mikveh Israel took possession of the cemetery and continues to administer it in the present day.

Mikveh Israel was a center of Jewish education in America during this time. Hyman Gratz had bequeathed US$150,000 (equivalent to $5,375,000 in 2025) in 1856 with provisions in his will to establish a college "for the education of Jews residing in the City and County of Philadelphia" and in 1895, members of Mikveh Israel founded Gratz College. Mikveh Israel members started Dropsie College, the first post-graduate institution for Jewish learning in the world in 1907, bringing Cyrus Adler to Philadelphia.

In 1899, Mikveh Israel counted 300 seatholders, of whom about 100 were members of the corporation, and had 67 students in its religious school.

Leon Haim Elmaleh (1873–1972) came to Mikveh Israel as religious leader in 1898 and served until 1929 when he became Reverend Emeritus until his death. Elmaleh was a founder of the Philadelphia Board of Rabbis and the Levantine Jews Society of Philadelphia. Elmaleh came from Gibraltar to Mikveh Israel, married his wife Fannie Feinberg at the synagogue in 1917, and maintained a long friendship with Christ Church minister Ernest Harding.

Cantor Shore was succeeded by Cantor Abraham Dubow until his passing in December 1972.

The synagogue's former building at 117 N 7th Street was razed in February 1913 to make way for commercial development.

== 2321 N Broad Street, 1909–1976 ==
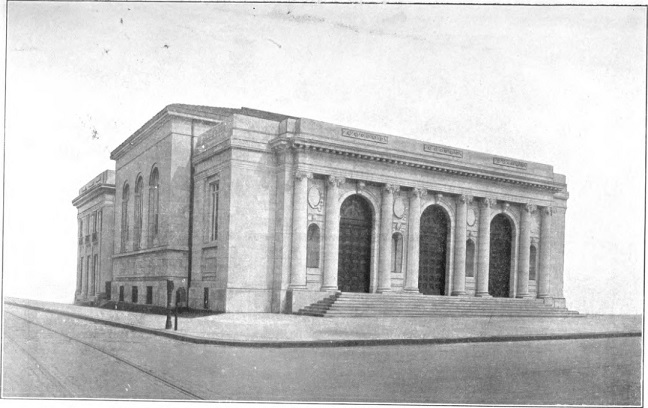
2321 N Broad Street (September 14, 1909)

In August 1907, the synagogue's Board selected the architecture firm of Pilcher and Tachau to design its fourth building to be built at Broad and York Streets. Samuel Elkin had left $60,000 to the congregation to be used for construction which was estimated to cost $150,000. The block until 1894 had been the site of Forepaugh Park where Adam Forepaugh presented circuses and spectacles, and where the Philadelphia Athletics played in 1890 and 1891. It was developed in the late 1890s with residential homes, and Mikveh Israel and Dropsie College built their complex in 1909 following the Jewish population up North Broad Street.

The one story Neo-Roman limestone building was dedicated on September 14, 1909. The congregation's Leon Elmaleh, Rabbi Pereira Mendes of Congregation Shearith Israel, and Philadelphia's Rabbi Bernard Levinthal all spoke at the ceremony.

During WWI, the Mikveh Israel Association applied for a Red Cross Auxiliary in the Southeastern Pennsylvania Chapter in May 1917. Leading women of the congregation established a work room in the adjoining Gratz College building where one day a week they made surgical garments and collected supplies.

Dr. Abraham A. Neuman (1890–1970) was rabbi from 1927 to 1943. Rabbi Neuman joined with A. S. W. Rosenbach to preside over a special service in February 1932 to commemorate the bicentennial of George Washington's birth at which Dr. Rosenbach read Washington's letter to the congregation.

During this period, the congregation counted prominent physician Jacob da Silva Solis-Cohen and movie theater magnate and philanthropist Jules Mastbaum as members. Mastbaum would gift the Rodin Museum to the City of Philadelphia.

The congregation celebrated its bicentennial the weekend of Thursday, November 28, 1940, concluding with a banquet at the Ritz-Carlton Hotel on Sunday, December 1, 1940. At this time, the congregation numbered 1,200 members. In December 1954, Mikveh Israel played a prominent role in Philadelphia's celebration of the tercentenary of Jewish settlement in North America. Reverend Elmaleh, then Minister Emeritus, blew shofar during the ceremony held in Congress Hall.

Dr. Neuman was succeeded as congregation rabbi by David Jessurun Cardozo (1896–1972). Reverend Alan D. Corre (1931–2017) came to Philadelphia from Manchester, England at age 24 in 1955 and served as rabbi until 1963. The congregation voted unanimously in April 1959 to amend its constitution and allow women to serve as officers on its Board of Adjuntos including as congregation president. Dr. Lillian S. Alpers would be the first woman elected to the Board in November 1959.

Noam Chomsky (born 1928) grew up in Philadelphia at Mikveh Israel on North Broad Street where his father, Dr. William Chomsky (1896–1977), ran the Hebrew school, was president of Gratz College, and taught at Dropsie College.

Rabbi Ezekiel Musleah (1927–2020) joined Mikveh Israel as minister in 1964 and served in this role until 1979.

Prior to its return to the historic district adjoining Independence Hall, Mikveh Israel sponsored a joint New Year Eve's service with Society Hill Synagogue at Society Hill's Spruce Street building on December 31, 1975 to celebrate the move of the Liberty Bell to its new pavilion and dawn of the Bicentennial year.

Dropsie College remained at the Broad and York complex following Mikveh Israel's departure. A 1981 fire damaged part of Dropsie College's building and the school eventually relocated to Temple Adath Israel in Merion in 1984. The complex was sold to a church, which did little to rehabilitate the fire-damaged building. The organization Food for Life purchased the complex in November 1992 for $275,000 from the church.

The 2321 N Broad Street building was sold for $825,000 in 2015, and was open to the public as a retail clothing store in 2017.

== 44 N Fourth Street, 1976–present ==
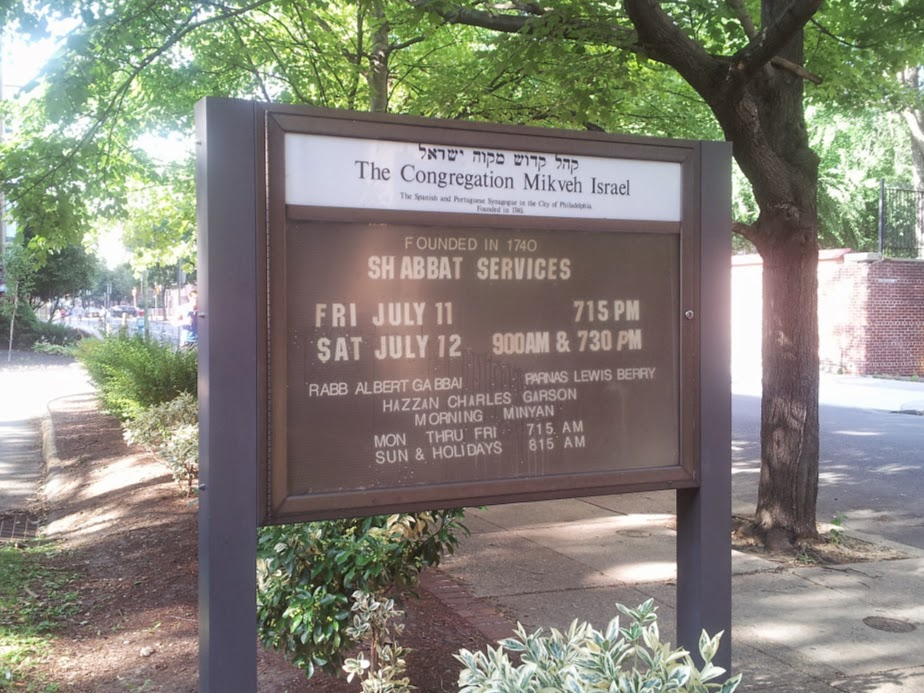
44 N 4th Street (July 2014)

The creation of Independence National Historical Park was authorized in 1948 and established in 1956. In February 1953, early plans for the redevelopment of the historic area around Independence Hall proposed the inclusion of a replica of the original Mikveh Israel building along with a library and auditorium.

The Jewish population along N Broad Street contracted in the years after World War II. The redevelopment of the blocks near Independence Hall presented an opportunity for the congregation to return to its original neighborhood which galvanized into local and national support.

Members had pledged $250,000 by spring 1961 and Christ Church donated $1,000 to the building fund to support and welcome the synagogue's return. Mikveh Israel initially considered locations at 8th and Spruce Streets, 5th and Locust Streets, and near the Christ Church burial ground. Later that year the synagogue had selected the site behind the burial ground, north of Market Street and south of Arch Street. The project was led by synagogue president David Arona and then continued by his successor Daniel C. Cohen.

Dr. Bernard J. Alpers, vice-president of the synagogue, persuaded his friend the Philadelphia architect Louis Kahn to plan the new synagogue building. Kahn produced ten designs for the building between 1961 and 1972. The Congregation decided that construction and maintenance costs would be too high and did not build Kahn's designs.

The new building was instead designed by the architectural firm Harbeson, Hough, Livingston & Larson on a more modest scale, and shared with the nascent National Museum of American Jewish History. The fifth building was dedicated and opened on July 4, 1976 President Gerald Ford gave the congregation a hand written letter with good wishes on the opening of the new building in the year of the nation's bicentennial and noting the country's ongoing commitment to religious liberty.

Rabbi Joshua Toledano (1944–2013) came to Mikveh Israel as minister in the early 1980s, and served until 1988 when he left to start the Mekor Baruch Center in Lower Merion. Rabbi Allan Lazaroff began to serve as minister in September 1989.

Rabbi Albert E. Gabbai served as congregation minister beginning in 1988; Rabbi Gabbai grew up in Cairo and was educated at Yeshiva University in New York and the Shehebar Sephardic Center in Jerusalem. Charles Garson of Gibraltar served as Hazzan from 2010 through 2014, and returns periodically for Jewish festivals and holidays. Rabbi Yosef Zarnighian succeeded Rabbi Gabbai as senior rabbi in 2023; Rabbai Gabbai remains active in the congregation and community as Rabbi Emeritus.

Contemporary Congregation Mikveh Israel logo

Mikveh Israel is an active synagogue with 200 families and is a member of the Center City Kehilla and regularly hosts Sephardic heritage cultural and educational events. The synagogue hosted the 2017 annual world conference of the Society for Crypto-Judaic Studies.

Mikveh Israel and Christ Church have a long-standing relationship dating from the founding of the synagogue to the present day. The present location of Mikveh Israel places the two congregations as close neighbors. Christ Church was supportive of Mikveh Israel's first plan to construct a building in the 18th-century. When Mikveh Israel's synagogue burned in 1872, Christ Church contributed funds to the construction of the new building. The congregations have a long-standing custom of sharing a fellowship-dinner once a year which alternates between the buildings of the two congregations.

Mikveh Israel is the site of the US memorial for Israel's Lieutenant Colonel Yonatan Netanyahu who was killed in the 1976 Operation Entebbe which rescued 102 of 108 hostages. Netanyahu had attended the Philadelphia area Cheltenham High School with brother Benjamin Netanyahu. Mikveh Israel was selected as the site of the United States memorial, constructed of granite and marble. Benjamin Netanyahu attended the 1986 dedication of the memorial as Deputy Ambassador to the United States and visited again in 2016 to mark the fortieth anniversary of his brother's death.

The National Museum of American Jewish History moved to its own building on the southeast corner of 5th and Market Streets on November 15, 2010.

Uriah P. Levy (1792–1862), who would be the first Jewish Commodore in the United States Navy, grew up in Philadelphia and celebrated his bar mitzvah at Mikveh Israel in 1807. A statue of Levy was commissioned by two Jewish U.S. Navy captains and dedicated at the 44 N Fourth Street site in 2011.

In October 2024, the congregation's building was vandalized and the target of arson although damage was limited, and the memorial to Yonatan Netanyahu defaced with profanity. The congregation continued with services on schedule and Rabbi Zarnighian was quoted in the press as saying, "We don't let these acts of fear and intimidation stop the traditions we've been carrying for three thousand years."

The congregation retained Jonathan Goldstein as archivist in 2025.

== Members ==
- David Franks, Continental Army aide-de-camp
- Barnard Gratz, Merchant and co-founder Mikveh Israel
- Abraham Hart, 19th-century Publisher
- Lucy Marks, 19th-century African American Jew
- Jules E. Mastbaum, Movie theater mogul and philanthropist
- A. S. W. Rosenbach, Antiquarian bookseller and philanthropist
- Haym Salomon, Revolutionary War financier
- Jacob da Silva Solis-Cohen, Physician
- Solomon Solis-Cohen, Physician and professor
- Arlen Specter, United States Senator from Pennsylvania
- Joan Specter, Philadelphia City Council Member
- Cyrus L. Sulzberger, merchant and philanthropist

== See also ==
- American Jews
- History of the Jews in the United States
- History of the Jews in Pennsylvania
- List of the oldest synagogues in the United States
