= Carey & Hart =

American publishing company

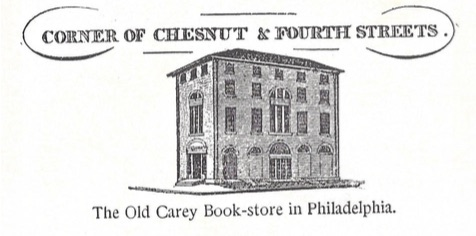

Carey & Hart was an American publishing company founded in Philadelphia, Pennsylvania, in 1829 by Edward L. Carey and Abraham Hart.

== History ==
In early November 1829, Edward Carey withdrew his partnership from his brother's company, Carey, Lea, & Carey, to form Carey & Hart alongside Abraham Hart. The duo took over the retail book business of Edward's former company and remained in the same building alongside Carey, Lea, & Carey, now renamed Carey & Lea. The companies were located on the southeast corner of Fourth and Chestnut Streets.

The company remained successful for 25 years, although Carey and Hart's partnership saw its end following Edward Carey's death on June 16, 1845. The establishment continued under the name Carey & Hart until September 1849. Hart's business throve until his retirement in 1854, which marked the end of Carey & Hart publishing company.
