= Sefer HaIkkarim =

Fifteenth-century work by rabbi Joseph Albo

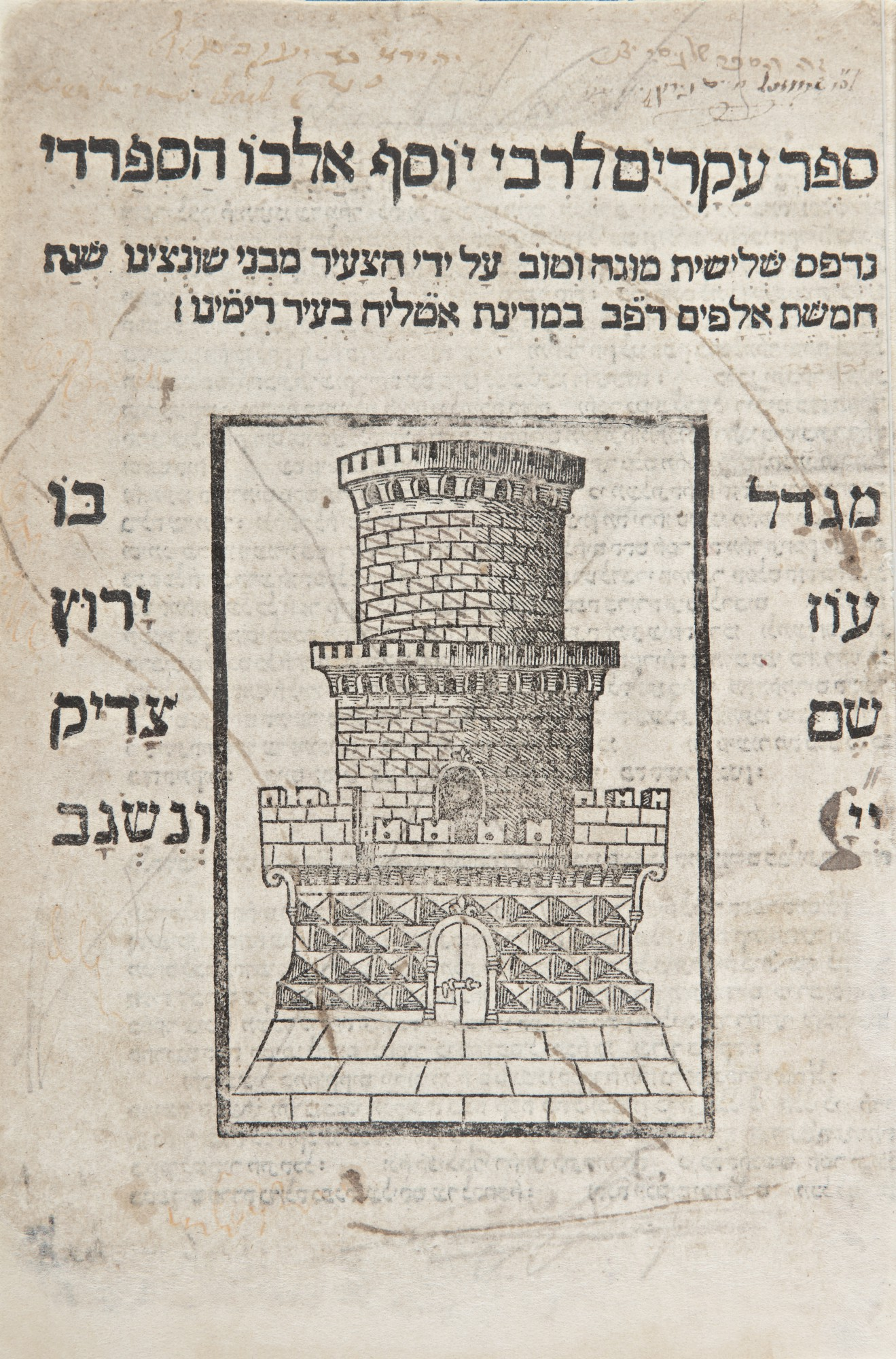
Frontispiece of Albo's book Sefer haIkkarim, printed in Rimini (Italy) by Gershom Soncino 1522

Sefer HaIkkarim (Hebrew: סֵפֶר הָעִקָּרִים, romanized: sēp̄er hāʿiqqārim, lit. 'Book of Principles') is a fifteenth-century work by rabbi Joseph Albo, a student of Hasdai Crescas. It is an eclectic, popular work, whose central task is the exposition of the principles of Judaism.

The work contains several internal contradictions. While most scholars see this as indicating Sefer HaIkkarim is an eclectic work, lacking originality and vision, recent scholars instead see this as one of Albo's methods for conveying esoteric messages.

== Principles of faith ==
His work is best known for its discussion of the Jewish principles of faith, in which he argues with other thinkers such as Maimonides.

Thus the number of primary and secondary principles of divine law in general, according to this, are eleven: existence of God, and the four secondary principles derived from it, viz., unity, incorporeality, independence of time, freedom from defects. Then divine revelation and the three secondary principles depending upon it, viz., God’s knowledge, prophecy, and the authenticity of the prophet’s mission. Finally, reward and punishment, and the secondary principle based upon it, viz., providence. If we combine divine knowledge and providence into one, as Maimonides does, the number will be ten... On the other hand we count God’s knowledge and providence as two separate dogmas, because they are different, as Maimonides explains in the Guide, and as all later authorities agree, though Maimonides himself combines them into one

— Joseph Albo, Sefer HaIkkarim

Albo stated that any religion (dat elohit), including Judaism, must have the following three fundamental principles, which he calls ikkarim (fundamentals) or ikarim kollelim (general fundamentals):

1. belief in the existence of God
2. belief in the revelation of God,
3. belief in divine justice, as related to the idea of immortality.

From these three principles, Albo posited that a religion must have eight derivative principles (shorashim [roots] or ikkarim peratiim [specific fundamentals]) which follow logically from the three fundamentals:

- From the existence of God:
  - God's unity
  - God's incorporeality
  - God's timelessness
  - God's perfection: in God there can be neither weakness nor other defect.
- From the revelation of God:
  - God's prophecy
  - God's prophet authentication
- From the reward and punishment of God:
  - God's omniscience
  - Reward and punishment, whether in this world or the World to Come

According to Albo, an individual who rejects one of either the three fundamental or the eight derivative principles is called a "heretic" in Jewish sources. Similarly, a religion which rejects one of these eleven principles is a false religion. Albo argues that the theologies of both Christianity and Islam misunderstand one of the "fundamentals" and thus reject one of the "derivative principles", making them false religions. Whereas, according to him, Judaism contains a correct understanding of these principles.

Albo also derives six "secondary principles" which a Jew should believe, but are not part of the fundamental or derivative principles. He calls these anafim (branches), as the "tree" of Judaism can stand without them (unlike the trunk or roots). These principles are:

- Creation ex nihilo
- The unique greatness of Moses' prophecy
- The eternity of the Torah (i.e. that it will not be replaced by a different law)
- That performing even one mitzvah entitles one to enter the World to Come (because otherwise, entering the World to Come would be harder after the Torah was given than beforehand via the basic Seven Laws of Noah, which would contradict the idea that the Torah is a beneficial gift to Jews).
- Resurrection
- The messiah

Denying these principles, too, makes a Jew a heretic and disqualifies him from the World to Come, even though these principles are not necessary for the existence of religion. However, elsewhere in the work Albo says that denying the messiah did not make the Talmudic Rabbi Hillel into a heretic. Albo's work contains a number of internal contradictions, and this may be one of them.

=== Distinctive features ===
Albo's three principles agree with Simeon ben Joseph of Lunel (i.e. Duran), but disagree with Maimonides' thirteen and Crescas' six.

In the formulation of other articles of faith, the controversies to which the compilers had been exposed influenced both the selection of the specific principles to be accentuated, and the way that they were presented. Similarly in the case of Joseph Albo, his selection was made with a view to correct the scheme of Maimonides in those points where it seemed to support the contentions of the Christian dogmatists and controversialists.

The title of his book indicates his method at the outset. Basic to his investigation is the recognition that "human happiness is conditioned by knowledge and conduct." But "human intellect can not attain unto perfect knowledge and ethical conduct, since its power is limited and soon exhausted in the contemplation of the things the truth of which it would find; therefore, of necessity, there must be something above human intellect through which knowledge and conduct can attain to a degree of excellence that admits of no doubt."

The insufficiency of human intellect postulates the necessity of divine guidance; and thus it is the duty of every person to know the God-given law. But to know it is possible only if one has established the true principles, without which there can be no divine law. Seeing that on this vital theme there are so much divergence, confusion, and shallowness, Albo resolves to erect a structure for the true religion.

=== Religious flexibility ===
Albo finds opportunity to criticize the opinions of his predecessors, yet he takes pains to avoid heresy hunting. Accordingly, he endeavors to establish the boundary-lines between which Jewish skepticism may be exercised without risk of forfeiture of orthodoxy. His canon for distinguishing heterodoxy from orthodoxy is the recognition of the truth of the Torah.

A remarkable latitude of interpretation is allowed. Albo rejects the assumption that creation ex nihilo is an essential implication of the belief in God. Albo freely criticizes Maimonides' thirteen principles of belief and Crescas' six principles. Albo states that neither Maimonides nor Crescas keeps in view his own fundamental criterion; namely, the absolute indispensability of a principle without which the trunk of the tree could not subsist; and on this score he rejects parts of their creeds.

== Other content ==
The book contains four sections. The first section explains his approach to the principles of faith. Sections 2, 3, and 4 are each ordered around one of his three fundamental principles. However, in addition to the discussions of principles of faith, the book contains many other subjects and sayings.

According to Albo there are three kinds of law: natural law, conventional law, and divine law. Natural law is the same for all persons, times, and places; conventional law is ordered by a wise judge in accord with reason; divine law is given by God through a prophet.

Albo's attitude toward meat eating is often quoted:

When the Torah was given to Israel... God prohibited some animals, which cause spiritual coarseness and filth [in those who eat them]. And the animals which were permitted, were permitted only to counteract the evil inclination.. eating meat was only permitted out of necessity... It is like wine; which even though it is good food and allowed to man, the Bible calls the Nazirite who avoid it "sacred".

== Publication and reception ==
Albo completed the Ikkarim in 1425 in Soria.

The Ikkarim was not composed in its entirety at once. The first part was published as an independent work. It develops the gist of Albo's thought; and it was only when its publication brought down upon him a deluge of criticism that he felt compelled to add to it.

In his preface to the second part Albo delivers a sermon on the subject of his critics: "He that would criticize a book should, above all, know the method employed by its author, and should judge all the passages on a certain subject as a whole." He castigates what he saw as the careless procedure of those passed judgment on an author without remembering this fundamental requirement of sound criticism.

Albo's opponents did not handle him delicately. He was accused, among other things, of plagiarism. It was maintained that he appropriated the thoughts of his teacher Hasdai Crescas without giving him due credit. Examination of the evidence, however, does not substantiate the indictment. Crescas having been Albo's teacher, the similarities are only such as might be reasonably expected in the writings of both teacher and student.

The first edition of the Ikkarim appeared at Soncino, 1485; it was published with a commentary under the title of Ohel Ya'akov, by Jacob ben Samuel Koppelman ben Bunem, of Brzesc (Kuyavia), Freiburg, 1584, and with a larger commentary by Gedeliah ben Solomon Lipschitz, Venice, 1618.

The passages containing criticism of Christian belief (3:25-26) were expunged by the censor from later editions, while Gilbert Genebrard wrote a refutation of these passages with valuable notes. This refutation was published with his own remarks by the baptized Jew Claudius Mai, Paris, 1566. The manuscript copies of the book were also subject to intense censorship.

== Translations ==
The Ikkarim was translated into German by Dr. W. Schlesinger, rabbi of Sulzbach, and his brother, L. Schlesinger, wrote an introduction to the same, Frankfort-on-the-Main, 1844.

There is an English translation of the book by Isaac Husik, published as a bilingual edition by the Jewish Publication Society in five volumes, 1946 (ASIN: B001EB9NWK).

A French translation with critical edition of the third chapter and commentaries was published by Philippe Bobichon: Yosef Albo, Sefer ha-‘Iqqarim [« Livre des Principes »], III, 25 : Un chapitre de la controverse judéo-chétienne dans l’Espagne du XVe siècle (texte hébreu traduction, commentaires), Madrid, CSIC, 2015 online
