= The Jewish Exponent =

Newspaper in Philadelphia, Pennsylvania

Coordinates: 39.95560°N 75.17515°W

- What It Means To Be Jewish In Philadelphia
- The November 27, 2007 front page of The Jewish Exponent
- Type: Weekly newspaper
- Format: Tabloid
- Owner: Mid-Atlantic Media
- Publisher: Craig Burke
- Editor-in-chief: N. Aaron Troodler
- Founded: April 15, 1887; 139 years ago
- Headquarters: Suite #113; Melrose Park, PA 19027
- Country: United States
- Circulation: 24,000 (as of 2015)
- Sister newspapers: The Guide to Jewish Philadelphia
- ISSN: 0021-6437
- Website: www.jewishexponent.com

The Jewish Exponent is a weekly newspaper of the Jewish community of Philadelphia, Pennsylvania and the second-oldest continuously published Jewish newspaper in the United States.

== History ==
The Jewish Exponent has been published continuously since April 15, 1887. A predecessor newspaper, The Jewish Record, had been published since 1875.

The paper was founded by 43 prominent Philadelphians—among them Henry Samuel Morais—who pledged that it would be "devoted to the interests of the Jewish people." It was an early supporter of Zionism. In the 1940s, the paper experienced financial difficulties, and on May 5, 1944, it was purchased by real estate magnate Albert M. Greenfield and turned over to the Allied Jewish Appeal, a precursor of the Jewish Federation of Greater Philadelphia, which still publishes it today via the Jewish Publishing Group.

In 1999, the Jewish Exponent launched its website. A totally re-designed website was launched in November 2012. The site contains timely news of a local, national, global and Israel nature, as well as blogs, special interest columns, classifieds, death notices and Mazel-Tov announcements. It is the home of the Jewish community events calendar with hundreds of events added monthly in a fashion that is searchable by event type, audience and location. The online guide to Jewish Philly provides a searchable method for the community to find out about every Jewish organization in the Delaware Valley, as well as businesses that wish to promote their products and services to the Jewish community of Greater Philadelphia. The site also allows users to register for weekly email newsletters as well as engage with the Jewish Exponent via social media such as Facebook and Twitter.

On June 3, 2015, the Exponent laid off its entire editorial staff. Reports said that the paper had been losing $300,000 per year. The owners contracted with Mid-Atlantic Media to operate the editorial department of the paper. Mid-Atlantic is based in Baltimore and produces several other Jewish papers, including the Baltimore Jewish Times, Washington Jewish Week, and Pittsburgh Jewish Chronicle. Joshua Runyan, Mid-Atlantic's editorial director, was named the paper's new editor, replacing Lisa Hostein.

On Feb. 28, 2022, the Exponent was sold by Jewish Publishing Group, a subsidiary of the Jewish Federation of Greater Philadelphia, to Mid-Atlantic Media.

In July 2022, the Exponent moved its office and archive from 2100 Arch St. to Gratz College’s Melrose Park campus. The school announced plans for library staff to organize, digitize and share online the publication’s archives within the next year.

In 2023, former director of business operations, Cheryl Lutts, was convicted of embezzling $1.4 million from the organization between 2014 and 2019.

== Circulation ==
The current circulation is made up of direct subscribers and those who donate to the Jewish Federation of Greater Philadelphia. In 2021, the Jewish Exponent had a print circulation of 20,000 and a "digital audience" of 500,000 a year. The paper had 40,000 subscribers in 2009. However, when the paper celebrated its 75th anniversary in 1962, it had the largest circulation of any Jewish newspaper in the United States. At the hundredth anniversary in 1987, the circulation was 65,000.

== Awards ==
In 2010 and 2011, the Jewish Exponent was named "Best Overall Weekly Newspaper" in Pennsylvania by the Keystone Pro Chapter of the Society of Professional Journalists. In 2014, the Keystone Chapter awarded the newspaper first place for "Use of the Web Among Non-Daily Publications." The Jewish Exponent was awarded one Simon Rockower Award by the American Jewish Press Association in 2019, two in 2022 and another two in 2023.
