= Mikveh Israel Cemetery (Federal Street Burial Ground) =

Jewish cemetery in South Philadelphia, US

Mikveh Israel Cemetery (11th and Federal)
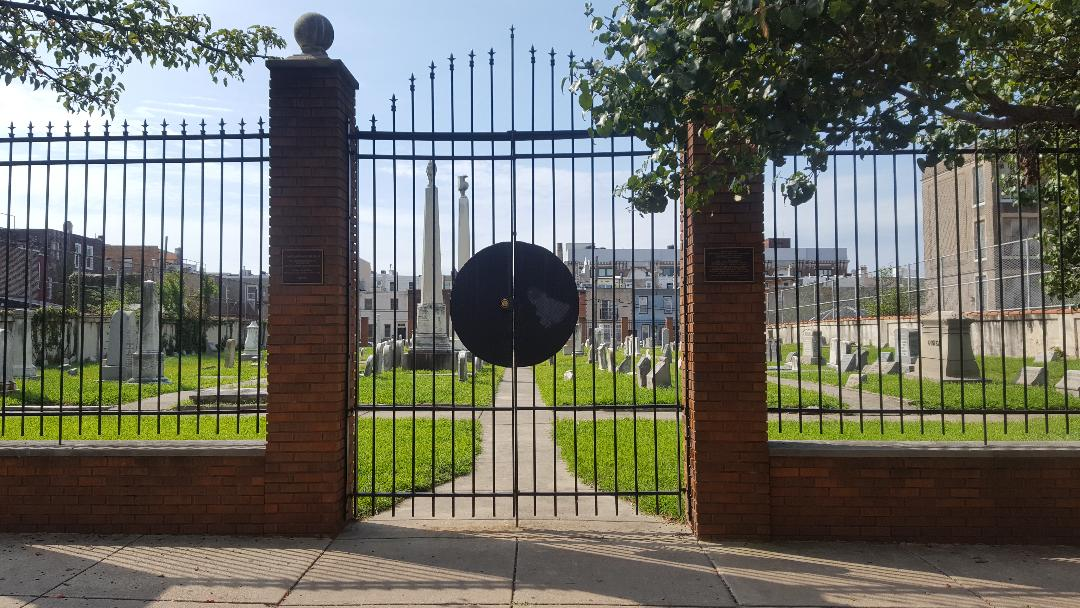
- 1114 Federal Street Entrance
- Interactive map of Mikveh Israel Cemetery (11th and Federal)

Details
- Established: 1849
- Location: 1114 Federal Street; Philadelphia, Pennsylvania
- Country: [United States
- Coordinates: 39°56′5″N 75°9′46″W
- Type: Jewish
- Owned by: Congregation Mikveh Israel

The Mikveh Israel Cemetery is a Jewish cemetery known as the Federal Street Burial Ground and located at 11th and Federal Streets in the Passyunk Square neighborhood of South Philadelphia. It was first called Beth Hahayim (Hebrew: בית החיים). It is one of three cemeteries belonging to Congregation Mikveh Israel, Philadelphia's oldest synagogue.

== History ==
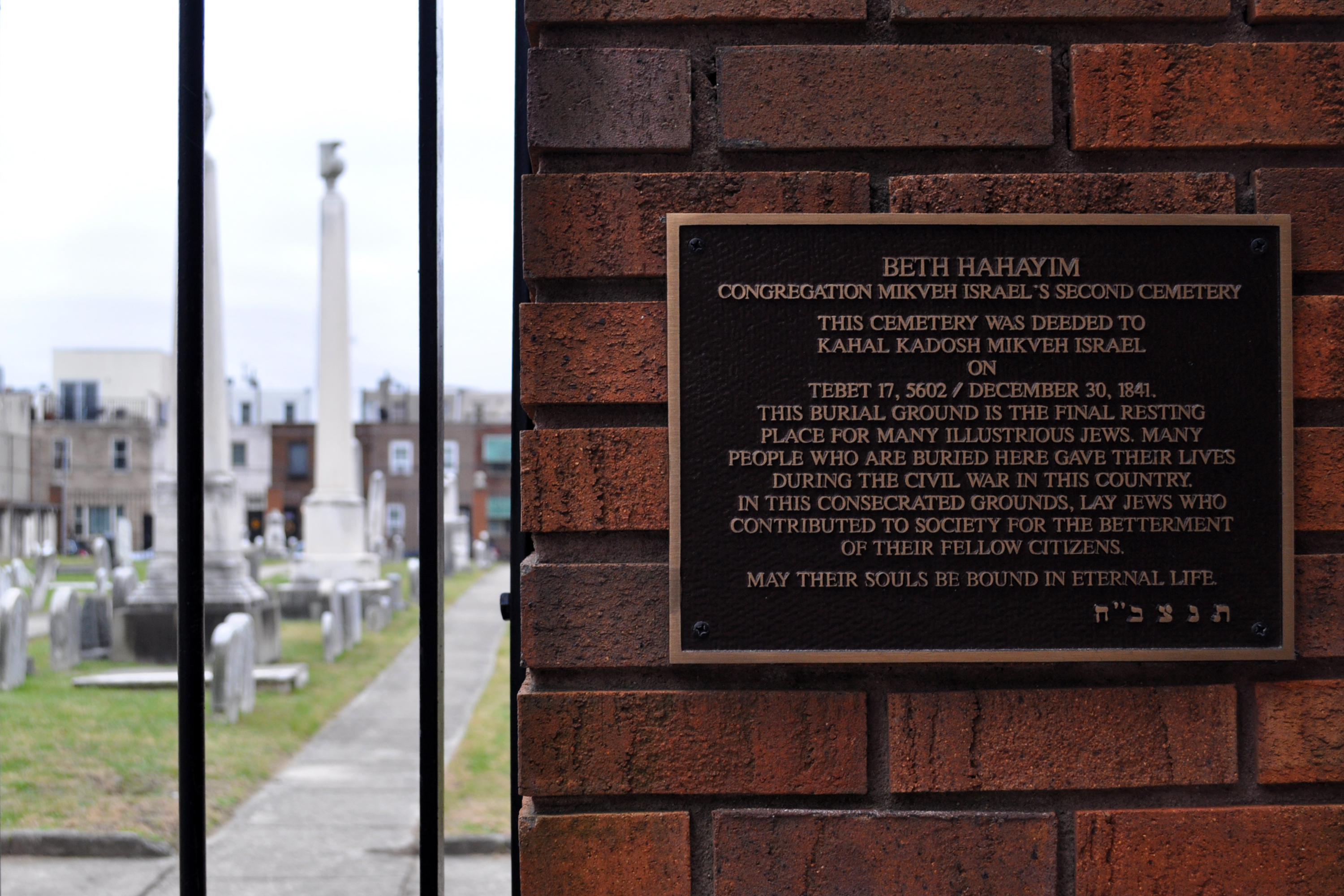

Congregation Mikveh Israel purchased the land for $2,650 from owners William and Catherine Alexander and Joel and Mary Sutherland in what was then the District of Southwark prior to the consolidation of the City of Philadelphia in 1854. The cemetery was deeded to Kahal Kadosh Mikveh Israel on December 30, 1841.

The American Legion, and other local veterans and civic groups held Memorial Day observances for veterans at the cemetery in the 1930s, 1940s, and 1950s.

The Pennsylvania Historical & Museum Commission erected a Pennsylvania Historical Marker at the site on October 4, 1990, citing the burials of Abraham Hart the publisher; Alfred Mordecai, soldier and engineer; Dr. Sabato Morais, rabbi and educator; and noted Civil War veterans. Although Judge Mayer Sulzberger is also referred to in the last footnote, he is actually buried at Mount Sinai Cemetery of Philadelphia.

The Italian Market Civic Association initiated the reconstruction of the Federal Street cemetery in 1994.

== Burials ==
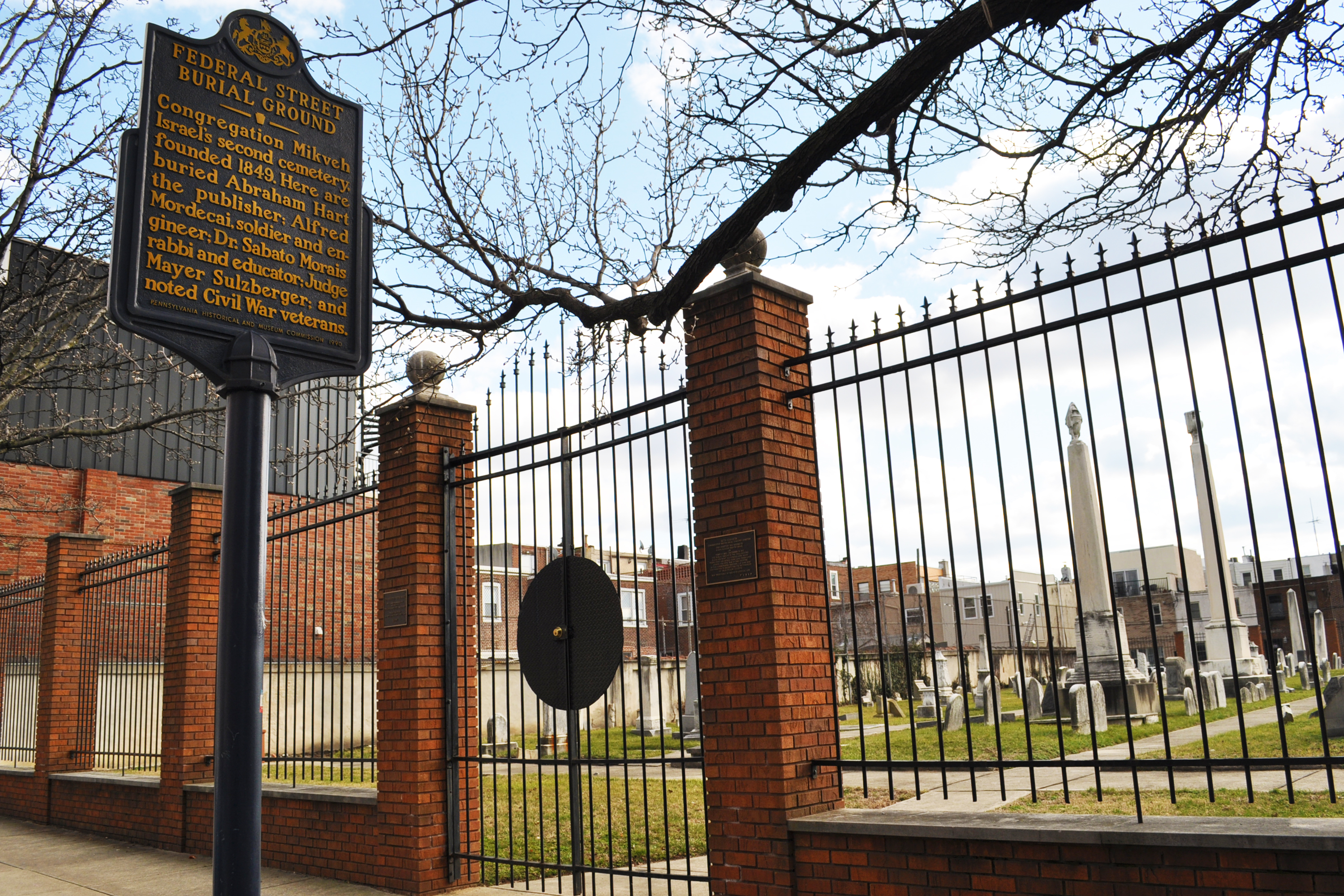
Historical marker

Veterans of the Civil War are interred here along with other prominent members of the Philadelphia Jewish community.

- Abraham Hart (1810-1885). Publisher, briefly led the Congregation Mikveh Israel.
- Jacob Raphael Cohen (1738-1811). Rabbi of Congregation Mikveh Israel from 1784, his records are an important source of data on early American Jewish ritual and history.
- Benzion Halper (1884-1924). Hebraist and Arabist, professor at Dropsie College.
- Sabato Morais (1823-1897). Italian-American rabbi, pioneer of Italian Jewish Studies in America, founder of the Jewish Theological Seminary of America.
- Isaac Djerassi (1925–2011). Member of the first graduating class of Hebrew University of Jerusalem in 1951, and Philadelphia area oncologist who advanced cancer therapy.

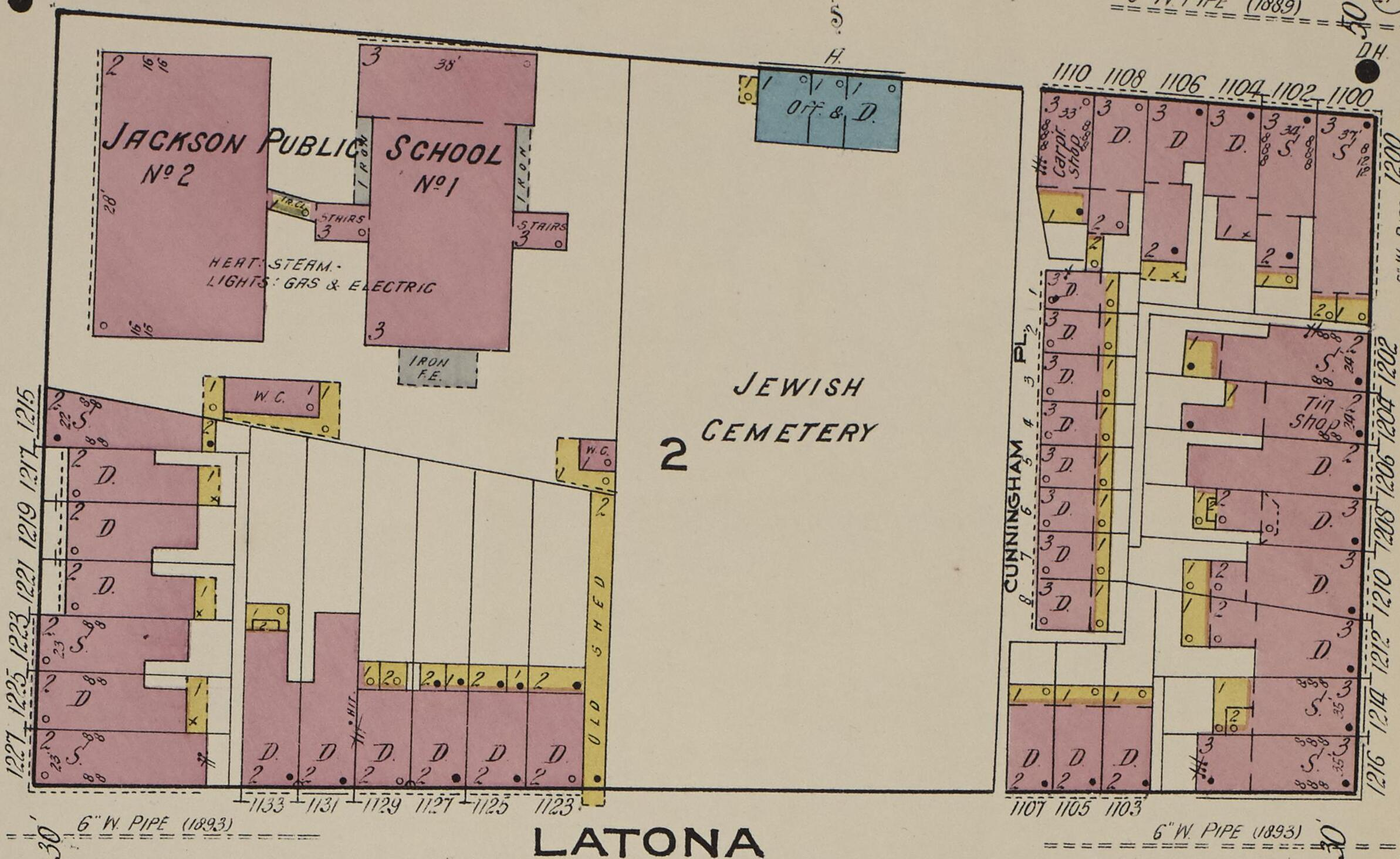
1917 map of Mikveh Israel Cemetery (Federal Street Burial Ground)

== See also ==
- Mikveh Israel Cemetery, 831 Spruce Street, Philadelphia
- Mikveh Israel Cemetery (Beth El Emeth), 55th and Market Streets, Philadelphia

== Media ==
- Kimberly Killeri (June 19, 2012). Congregation Mikveh Israel's Second Cemetery Philadelphia, PA. YouTube.com.
