= Jacob Raphael Cohen =

- Born: 1738; Barbary Coast
- Died: September 9, 1811 (aged 72–73); Philadelphia, Pennsylvania, United States
- Burial place: Mikveh Israel Cemetery (Federal Street Burial Ground)
- Spouse: Rebecca Luria (m. 1764)

Jacob Raphael Cohen (1738 – September 9, 1811) was a rabbi in England, Canada, and the United States.

He served as rabbi of Congregation Mikveh Israel in Philadelphia from 1784 until his death in 1811. In celebration of Pennsylvania's ratification of the United States Constitution on July 4, 1788, Cohen walked arm-in-arm with two ministers, one of whom was Reverend William White of Christ Church, dean of the clergy of Philadelphia. The records of his marriages, deaths, and circumcisions are an important source of data on early American Jewish ritual and history.
