= Jessurun Cardozo =

American rabbi (1896–1972)

Rabbi David Abraham Jessurun Cardozo (March 29, 1896 – August 31, 1972) was a Dutch-born American Sephardic Rabbi who served as assistant minister of the Spanish and Portuguese Synagogue in New York City, the oldest synagogue in the United States and was the first rabbi to conduct High Holidays services in Spain since the Alhambra Decree of 1492 expelled Jews from that country.

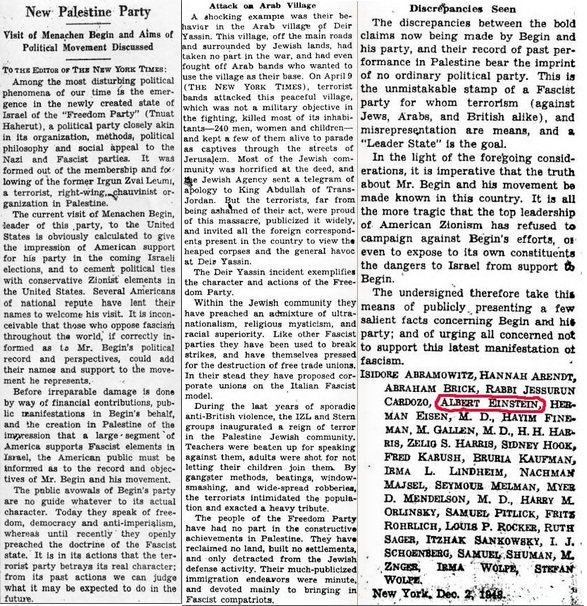
Albert Einstein and Rabbi David Abraham Jessurun Cardozo letter

Cardozo was born in Amsterdam on March 29, 1896, to Abraham Jessurun Cardozo and Marie Serlui. He attended the Sephardic Seminary there and Jews' College in London, as well as the University of Amsterdam and the University of London. Rabbi Cardozo was the spiritual leader of the Montefiore synagogue in Ramsgate from 1929 to 1936.

Rabbi Cardozo came to the United States to assist Rabbi David de Sola Pool from 1936 to 1943 at the Spanish and Portuguese Synagogue on the Upper West Side of the New York City borough of Manhattan. Cardozo was selected in September 1943 to succeed Rabbi Abraham A. Newman at Congregation Mikveh Israel in Philadelphia, one of the oldest synagogues in the United States. He later served as Rabbi of Sephardic Jewish centers in the Bronx and Queens.

In 1948, The New York Times published a letter signed by Rabbi Cardozo and two dozen prominent Jewish figures including Hannah Arendt and Albert Einstein, which criticized the Herut party, described it as an outgrowth of the Irgun which the letter called "a terrorist, right-wing, chauvinist organization in Palestine" and criticized a visit to the United States by its leader, Menachem Begin.

Invited to Spain in 1953 to lead services for Rosh Hashanah and Yom Kippur, Rabbi Cardozo was able to conduct prayer services and stated that he had no difficulty in bringing Hebrew prayer books into the country or of arranging the use of the facilities of the ballroom of a major new hotel. The services he led, reaching out to the 400 Spanish-speaking Jews in Madrid, were the first there since the expulsion of the Jews from Spain in 1492. Rabbi Cardozo expressed his belief that the government of Francisco Franco was showing a "more friendly" approach to the Jews of Spain, noting that permission had been granted by the Spanish government to construct a synagogue in Barcelona.

Rabbi Cardozo died at age 76 on August 31, 1972, and was survived by a brother and sister.
