= Salvatore de Benedetti =

Italian academic and translator (1818–1891)

- Born: April 18, 1818; Novara, Piedmont, Kingdom of Sardinia
- Died: August 4, 1891 (aged 73); Pisa, Tuscany, Kingdom of Italy
- Awards: Order of the Crown of Italy (1881)

Academic work
- Institutions: University of Pisa
- Notable students: Sabato Morais

Salvatore de Benedetti (April 18, 1818 – August 4, 1891) was an Italian scholar of Hebrew and Jewish studies.

== Biography ==
Salvatore de Benedetti was born into a Jewish family in Novara, Piedmont. As Jewish students were barred from public schools in Italy, Benedetti attended the Collegio Foa in Vercelli, a Jewish boarding school which primarily trained rabbis. After finishing his studies there, Benedetti chose not to pursue a religious career and instead made a living through teaching and editorial work for newspapers in Piedmont and Milan. Around this time, he also translated Adolphe Franck's work on Kabbalah into Italian in an abridged version. In 1844, he was appointed superintendent of the Pie scuole israelitiche in Livorno.

During the 1848–49 revolts, he aligned himself with Giuseppe Mazzini's faction, and participated in the publication of the Corriere Livornese, a newspaper supporting Italian unification. When Austrian forces invaded Livorno, Benedetti relocated to Turin, where he continued his journalism career. There he joined the editorial team of the Progresso, founded by Cesare Correnti. Following the closure of that paper, he returned to Novara, where he gave public lectures on history and founded the newspaper La Vedetta, which acted as a link between free Piedmont and Austrian-controlled Lombardy.

With the changing political landscape in Italy under King Victor Emmanuel II and Prime Minister Camillo di Cavour, Benedetti shifted his focus to academics and literature. In 1862, he was appointed professor of Hebrew at the University of Pisa, a position he held until his death.

== Work ==
Among Benedetti's most notable work was Vita e morte di Mosè (1879), wherein he compiled and translated legends about Moses. His Canzoniere sacro di Giuda Levita (1871), a translation of the poems of Judah ha-Levi, introduced Italian audiences to medieval Hebrew poetry. He also dedicated several studies to Galileo, and applied his methods to philology.

=== Publications ===
- Il terzo centenario di Galileo. Pisa: Tipografia Nistri. 1864.
- Del metodo di Galileo nella filologia. Turin: Tipografia Arnaldi. 1864.
- Della educazione rustica. Florence. 1865.
- Elisa Finocchietti Toscanelli. Pisa. 1870.
- I teologi naturali. Pisa: Tipografia Nistri. 1871.
- Canzoniere sacro di Giuda Levita. Pisa: Tipografia Nistri. 1871.
- Storia di Rabbi Giosuè, figliuolo di Levi. 1871.
- "La leggenda ebraica de' dieci martiri e La perdonanza sullo stesso argomento". Annuario della Societa italianà per gli studi orientali. 2. 1872.
- La Perdonanza. 1873.
- Giuseppe Levi. Florence. 1876.
- Vita e morte di Mosè. 1879.
- Marianna Foà Uzielli. Livorno: Tipografia di Francesco Vigo. 1880.
- "Dei presenti studi sul Talmud e specialmente sull' Aggada". Proceedings of the Fourth Congress of Orientalists. Florence. 1880.
- L'antico testamento e la letteratura italiana. Pisa: Tipografia Nistri. 1885.
