= Solomon Solis-Cohen =

- Born: 1 September 1857; Philadelphia, Pennsylvania
- Died: 12 July 1948 (aged 90); Philadelphia, Pennsylvania
- Occupations: Physician and professor of medicine
- Known for: Essentials of medical diagnosis (1892); 2nd edition (1900)

Solomon da Silva Solis-Cohen (1857–1948) was an American physician, professor of medicine, and prominent Zionist.

== Biography ==
Solomon Solis-Cohen was educated at public schools in Philadelphia. He received the Bachelor of Arts degree in 1872 and the Master of Arts degree in 1877 from Philadelphia's Central High School. He taught Hebrew in the school of the Hebrew Education Society of Philadelphia for two years while studying medicine (1881–1883) and received his medical degree from the Jefferson Medical College in 1883.

Solis-Cohen taught in 1887–1902 at the Philadelphia Polyclinic and in 1890–1892 at Dartmouth College. He was a professor of clinical medicine at Jefferson Medical College from 1902 to 1927, when he retired as professor emeritus. He was a fellow of the American Association for the Advancement of Science and a trustee of the U.S. Pharmacopoeia Convention. His basic research in medicine was widely noted.

He was a founder and trustee of the Jewish Theological Seminary of America and a founder of the Jewish Publication Society of America. He attended the Third Zionist Congress at Basel in 1899 and was a member of the provisional executive of the Zionist Organization of America for some time during WWI.

He published a book of his poetry, When love passed by, and other verses: including translations from Hebrew poets of the Middle Ages (1929), and a selection of his writings and addresses, Judaism and Science, with other addresses and papers (1940).

== Family ==
In 1885, Solis-Cohen married his cousin Emily Grace Solis. They had three sons (David Hays, Leon, and Francis Nathan) and one daughter (Emily Elvira). Jacob da Silva Solis-Cohen (1838–1927), a physician and founder of laryngology in the US, was Solomon Solis-Cohen's brother.

== Selected publications ==
- "Washington's death and the doctors". Lippincott's Monthly Magazine. 4: 945–952. 1899.
- with George D. Heist: "The bacterial action of the whole blood of rabbits following inoculations of pneumococcus bacterins". The Journal of Immunology. 4 (4): 147–166. 1 July 1919.
- with George D. Heist and Myer Solis-Cohen: "A study of the virulence of meningococci for man and of human susceptibility to meningococcic infection". The Journal of Immunology. 7 (1): 1–33. 1 January 1922.

== See also ==
- Jews in Philadelphia
