= Edward L. Carey =

American publisher

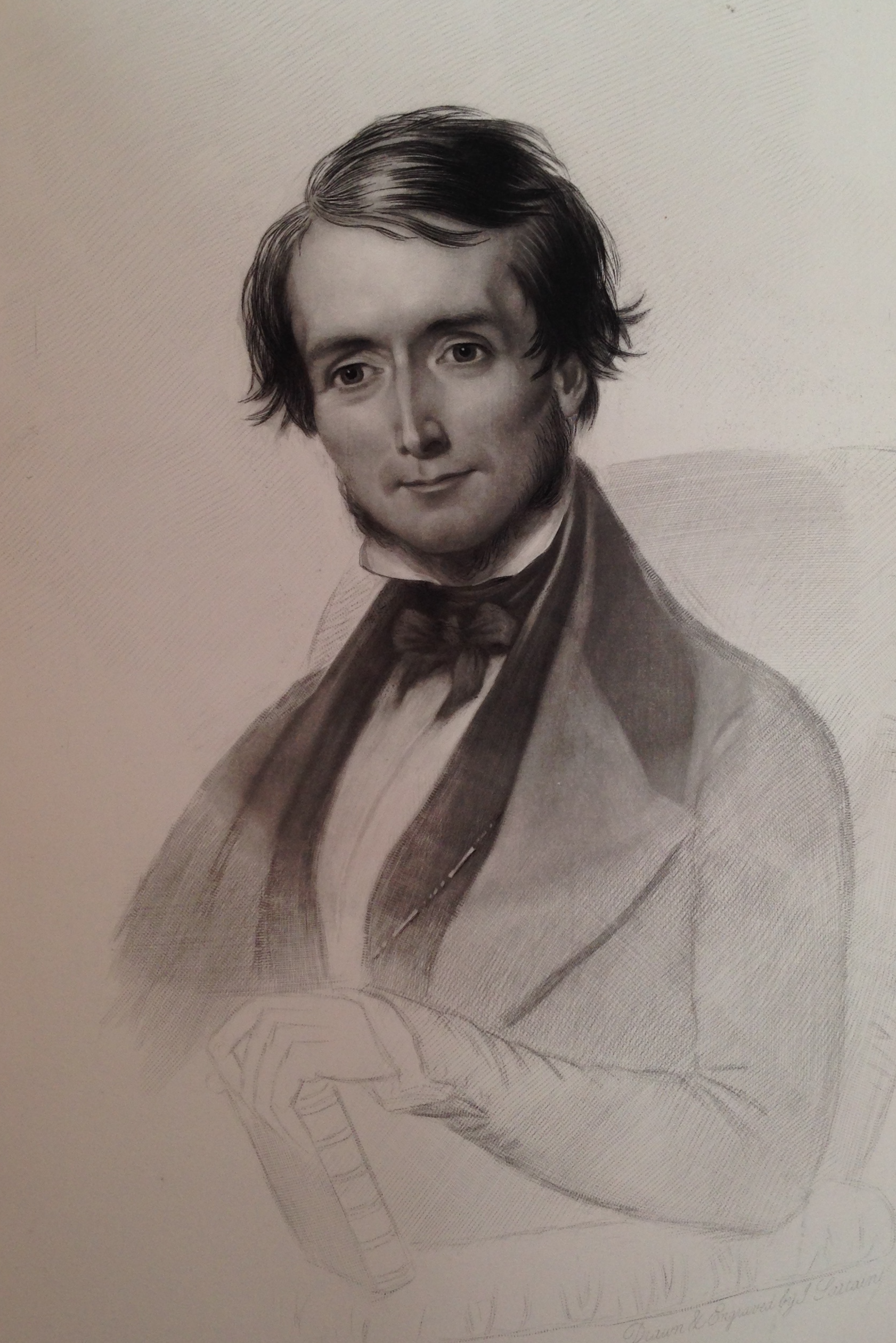
Portrait of Edward L. Carey by John Sartain

Edward Lawrence Carey (April 7, 1805 – June 16, 1845) was an American publisher and Aesthete, notable for co-founding the publishing firm Carey & Hart alongside Abraham Hart.

== Biography ==
Edward Lawrence Carey, born April 7, 1805, was the son of American publisher Mathew Carey and Bridget Flahaven Carey. Edward's older brother, Henry Charles Carey, also a notable publisher, purchased their father's business in 1822, forming the publishing firm Carey & Lea. Under this firm, Edward ran transactions and soon became a junior partner alongside his brother, owning half of the share alongside Isaac Lea. The three formed the firm Carey, Lea & Carey. On November 1, 1829, Edward detached himself from his brother's firm and formed a partnership with Abraham Hart, producing Carey & Hart. Carey and Hart found great success, publishing notable authors such as Henry Wadsworth Longfellow, William Cullen Bryant, and Eliza Leslie.

Carey's health began declining over a course of three years prior to his death in 1845. According to William Gilmore Simms, editor of the Southern and Western Magazine and Review, Carey died "after suffering for some years from a tedious affection of the spine." He died in Philadelphia at 11:00AM on June 16, 1845 at the age of 40. It is noted in an obituary from the Washington Reporter that Carey collected and appreciated artwork, and was anticipating the arrival of an art piece, "Proserpine," sculpted by Hiram Powers, at the time of his death. He was elected President of the Academy of Fine Arts prior to his death, which he declined due to poor health.
