= Jacob da Silva Solis-Cohen =

American physician laryngologist

Dr. Jacob da Silva Solis-Cohen
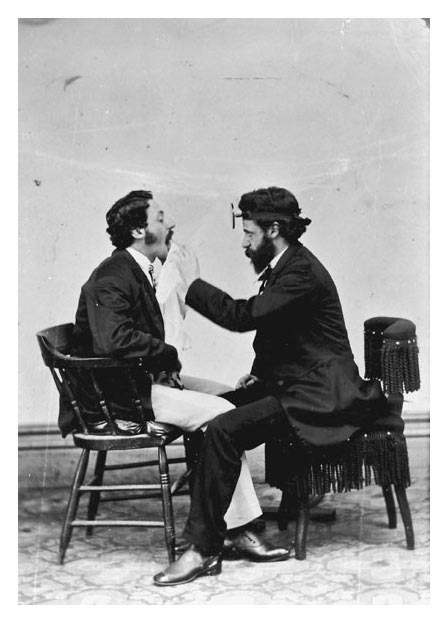
- Jacob da Silva Solis-Cohen (right), shown examining a patient (Photograph circa 1868, courtesy of Thomas Jefferson University Archives and Special Collections, Scott Memorial Library, Philadelphia.)
- Born: February 28, 1838; New York City
- Died: December 22, 1927 (aged 89); Philadelphia, PA
- Spouse: Miriam (nee Binswanger) Solis-Cohen

Jacob da Silva Solis-Cohen (February 28, 1838 – December 22, 1927) was a physician who specialized in the field of laryngology.

== Personal life ==
Jacob da Silva Solis-Cohen was born in New York City to Myer David Cohen and Judith Simiah da Silva Solis who were both from prominent Sephardic families. He was an elder brother of Leon da Silva Solis-Cohen and Solomon Solis-Cohen and a grandson of Jacob da Silva Solis. Jacob da Silva Solis-Cohen's family can be traced back to their expulsion from Spain. Of note is Solomon da Silva Solis (Jacob da Silva Solis-Cohen's great-grandfather), who fled to Amsterdam from Spain in the 17th century and married Isabel da Fonseca, daughter of the marquis of Turin, count of Villa Real and Monterrey. In 1875 he married Miriam Binswanger, with whom he had eight daughters (Judith Simira, Sophia Rebecca, Miriam Fonseca, Elinor, Rosalie Isabel, Bertha Florence, Esther and Edith) and three sons (Myer, Jacob da Silva Jr. and Isadore).

== Career ==
In 1840, after only two years of his life spent in New York City, his family moved to Philadelphia. Solis-Cohen was educated at Central High School and the University of Pennsylvania and Jefferson Medical College where he earned his medical degree in 1860.

In 1861 he began his medical residency at Old Blockley in Philadelphia but resigned the same year to enlist as a private in the Union army at the outbreak of the Civil War. He was soon commissioned as a lieutenant in the infantry and later appointed as assistant surgeon in the Twenty-sixth Regiment of the Pennsylvania Volunteers. After serving in Hooker's Brigade in the defense of Washington, D.C., he later transferred to the Navy as Acting Assistant Surgeon, serving under Rear Admiral S.F. DuPont, in the expedition to Port Royal Harbor, South Carolina, on the United States Steamer Florida. He remained in the South Atlantic Blockading Squadron until January 12, 1864, when he resigned from the Navy.

After the Civil War, he began his work in the field of laryngology. In 1866, he was the first in the United States to institute regular lectures on laryngology at the Philadelphia School of Anatomy. In 1870 he was appointed lecturer on laryngoscopy and diseases of the throat and chest in the Jefferson Medical College and two years later professor of laryngology. His first work on the subject, entitled "Inhalation in the Treatment of Disease", was published in 1867, and was followed in 1872 by his great work "Diseases of the Throat and Nasal Passages."

In 1874, Solis-Cohen published a monograph on "Croup in its Relations to Tracheotomy", based on the study of 5,000 recorded cases; in 1875 he published a book on "The Throat and Voice". He was one of the founders of the Archives of Laryngology and for many years edited the laryngological department of the American Journal of the Medical Sciences. He also helped to found the American Laryngological Association, of which he was the second president from 1880 to 1882. As the result of his experience in the Civil War he excelled in the surgery of the upper air passages. In 1892 he was the first in America to perform a successful complete laryngectomy. In 1884, he was elected as a member to the American Philosophical Society.

== Personal ==
Solis-Cohen lived in his later life at 1833 Pine Street in the Rittenhouse Square neighborhood of Philadelphia. He was a member of Congregation Mikveh Israel and the synagogue's minister, Rabbi Leon Elmahleh officiated his funeral.
