= Gratz College =

Private Jewish college in Jenkintown, Pennsylvania, United States

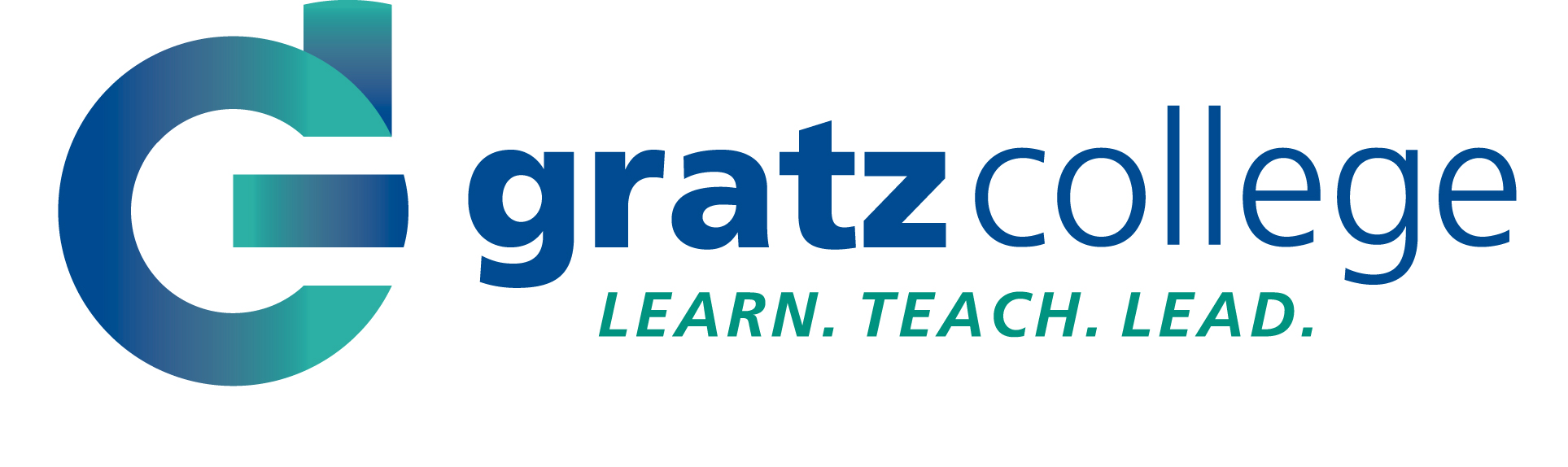
- Type: Private college
- Established: 1895; 131 years ago
- Founder: Hyman Gratz
- Religious affiliation: Judaism
- President: Zev Eleff
- Dean: Leslie Ginsparg Klein
- Location: 382 Bala Avenue, Bala Cynwyd, Pennsylvania, 19004, United States; 40.0685°N 75.1332°W
- Website: www.gratz.edu

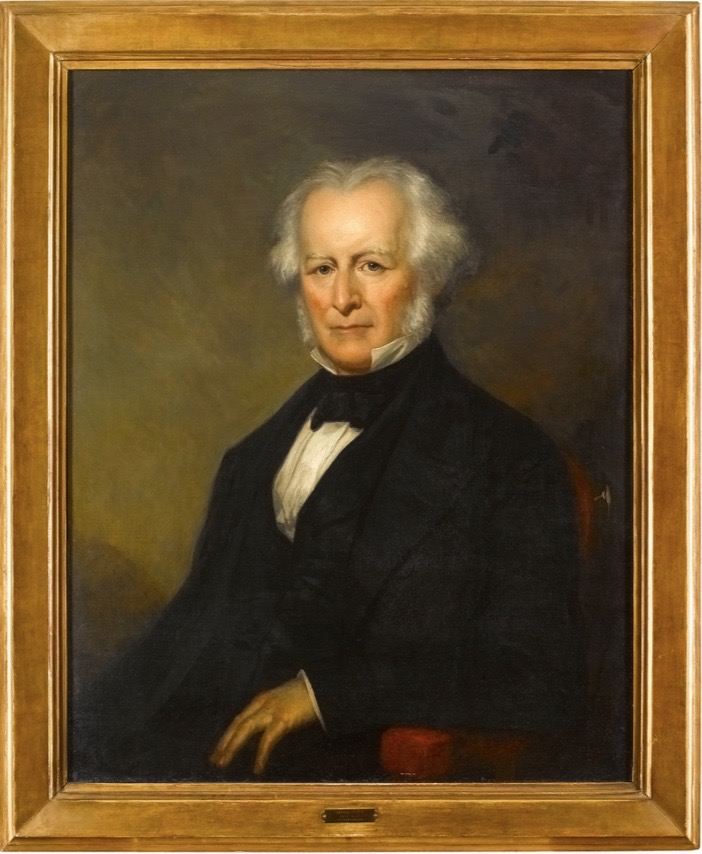
Hyman Gratz

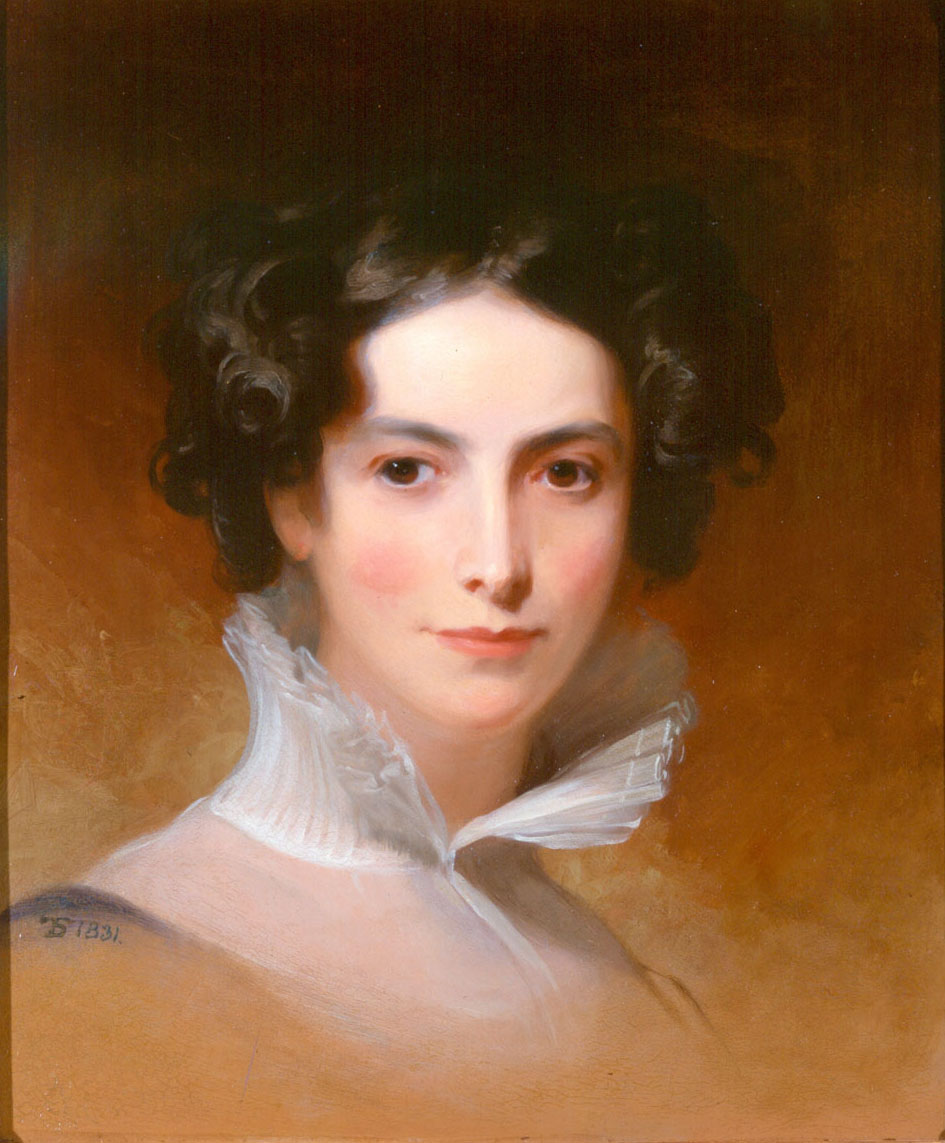
Rebecca Gratz

Gratz College is a private Jewish college in Bala Cynwyd, Pennsylvania, United States. The college traces its origins to 1856 when banker, philanthropist, and communal leader Hyman Gratz and the Hebrew Education Society of Philadelphia (established in 1849 by Rebecca Gratz and Isaac Leeser) joined to establish a trust to create a Hebrew teachers college. Gratz is a graduate college located in a suburban setting, with fully online courses.

In addition to its graduate certificate, master's, and doctoral programs, Gratz also runs cultural programs, adult education offerings, and the Tuttleman Library for Jewish studies. Gratz operates the first online Master of Arts in Holocaust and Genocide Studies, as well as the only fully online doctoral program in Holocaust and Genocide Studies in the world.

== History ==
In 1856, Hyman Gratz signed a Deed of Trust to create a college after his death if various heirs died without children. The trust provided for "the establishment and support of a college for the education of Jews residing in the city and county of Philadelphia”. Hyman Gratz died on January 27, 1857, at age 81, and on October 15, 1893, the last heir named in the will died without any children. Thus the Gratz estate became available to create the college. On March 20, 1895, the trustees responsible for creating the college received slightly over $105,000 from the trust to create the college. The college was officially founded in February 1895. Starting in October 1895, the college sponsored various lectures and other educational programs.

In 1897, under the leadership of board president Moses A. Dropsie, Gratz College hired the first three faculty members: Henry M. Speaker (Principal, Jewish Literature), Arthur A. Dembitz (Jewish History), Isaac Husik (Hebrew Language). Classes officially began in January, 1898. Henry M. Speaker was an 1894 graduate of the Jewish Theological Seminary of America where he studied Jewish Education. Isaac Husik, while teaching at Gratz, received his Ph.D. in philosophy from University of Pennsylvania in 1902. He remained on the Gratz faculty until 1916 when he became a professor of philosophy at the University of Pennsylvania. Arthur Dembitz was the first cousin of Louis Dembitz Brandeis who at the time was one of the leading Jewish attorneys in the United States and in 1916 became the first Jew to serve on the US Supreme Court.

Following the model of the early Jewish educator, Rebecca Gratz (Hyman's sister), the first classes at Gratz College were focused on the training of teachers. Women were accepted and educated on the same basis as men. There were eight women and five men in the first afternoon class and the first evening class had twelve women and nine men. Women were inspired to gain training and enrolled in Gratz to become teachers of various aspects of Jewish culture, literature, history and language.

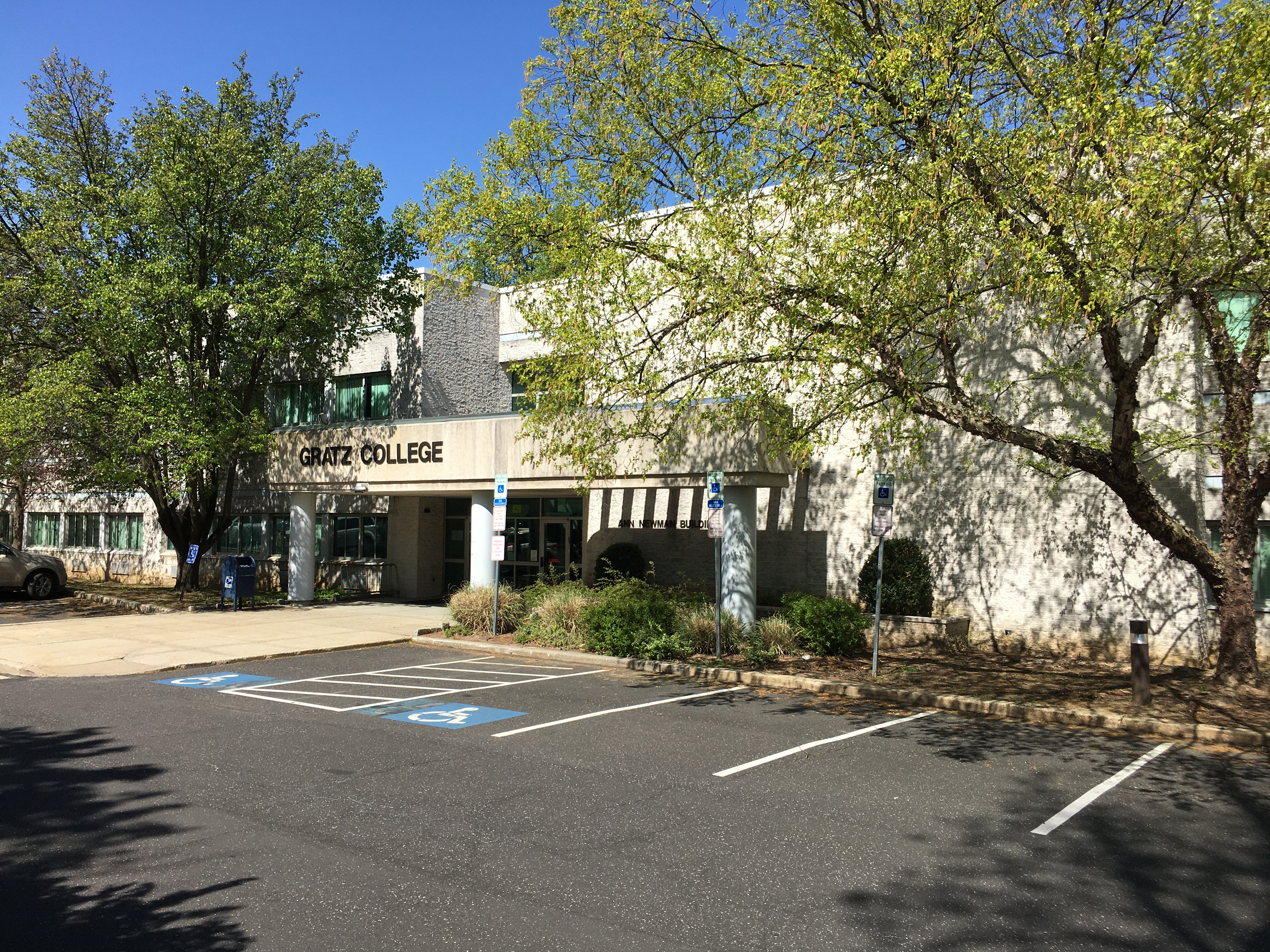
Gratz College front entryway, picture taken in May 2022

== Academics ==
Gratz College has four doctoral programs: Doctor of Holocaust and Genocide Studies (Ph.D.), Doctor of Jewish Studies (Ph.D.), Doctor of Antisemitism Studies (Ph.D.), and Doctor of Education in Leadership (Ed.D.). Gratz master's degree programs include Master of Arts and Master of Science programs.

Gratz College is "the only institution in the United States to offer a Doctor of Holocaust and Genocide Studies degree, as opposed to a Ph.D. in a related discipline, like history or sociology." The doctorate is the first online Ph.D. in Holocaust and Genocide Studies. Gratz College is also the first and only institution in the world to offer a Doctor in Antisemitism Studies.

In addition to degree programs, Gratz also offers graduate certificate programs and professional development programs, including courses for educators (CEU) and Continuing Legal Education (CLE) opportunities. In addition, the local community is offered 'Lunch and Learn', an educational speaker series held monthly.

== Organization and administration ==
Gratz College is a not-for-profit educational institution governed by a 31-member Board of Governors. Historically, most members of the Board of Governors lived in greater Philadelphia, however the current board also has members in New Jersey, Maryland, and British Columbia. The current president of Gratz College is Zev Eleff, who took office in September 2021. The dean of the college is Leslie Ginsparg Klein.

== Accreditation ==
Gratz is accredited by the Middle States Commission on Higher Education. Gratz was first accredited in 1967. The 2015 Carnegie Classification is Special Focus Four-Year - Other Special Focus Institutions.

== Notable alumni ==
- Gershon Agron, mayor of Jerusalem 1955–1959
- Lori Alhadeff, activist and member of the Broward County School Board
- Mark B. Cohen (1972), Common Pleas Court Judge, Philadelphia (2018–present), House of Representatives (1974–2016)
- Arnold Dashefsky (1963), Professor of Sociology at University of Connecticut, Director of the North American Jewish databank
- Isidore Dyen (c. 1928), linguist, professor emeritus of Malayo-Polynesian and Comparative Linguistics at Yale University
- Louis Fischer, journalist, author, winner of National Book Award (1965) for The Life of Lenin
- Israel Goldstein (1911), scholar, author, Rabbi of Congregation B'nai Jeshurun (Manhattan) on New York's Upper West Side (1918–1960), Founder of Brandeis University (1946), President of The Jewish National Fund of America (1934–1943)
- Cyrus H. Gordon, scholar of Near Eastern cultures and ancient languages
- William E. Kaufman, rabbi and author of books on Jewish Philosophy
- Samuel Noah Kramer, author, leading Assyriologist, expert in Sumerian history and Sumerian language, Professor at University of Pennsylvania
- Michael Levin (soldier) (c. 2000) – American born soldier in the Paratroopers Brigade of the Israel Defense Forces (IDF), KIA 2006 in Lebanon
- Noam Pitlik, actor, director, 1979 Emmy winner for Outstanding Directing for a Comedy Series
- Claire Polin, American composer of contemporary classical music, musicologist, and flutist
- Sandy Eisenberg Sasso, author, first woman rabbi in Reconstructionist Judaism, with her husband formed the first rabbinical couple in Jewish History

== See also ==
- List of Jewish universities and colleges in the United States

== Bibliography ==
- King, Diane A. (1979). A History of Gratz College, 1893-1928 (PhD dissertation). Dropsie University.
