= Levinthal =

Levinthal is a surname. It may refer to:

- Bernard L. Levinthal (1864–1953), a prominent Philadelphia rabbi
  - Israel H. Levinthal (1888–1982), Lithuanian-American rabbi, son of Bernard
    - Helen Levinthal (1910–1989), the first American woman to complete the entire course of study in a rabbinical school, daughter of Israel
  - Louis E. Levinthal (1892–1976), American lawyer and judge, son of Bernard
  - Cyrus Levinthal (1922–1990), American molecular biologist, grandson of Bernard
- David Levinthal (born 1949), American photographer
