= Index of Jewish history–related articles =

== 0–9 ==
188th Armored Brigade · 1920 Nebi Musa riots · 1929 Palestine riots · 1948 Arab–Israeli War · 1949 Armistice Agreements · 1982 Lebanon War · 1992 attack on Israeli embassy in Buenos Aires · 2000 Camp David Summit · 2004 attempt to revive the Sanhedrin · 613 mitzvot · 92nd Street Y

== A ==
Av · Abaye · Abbahu · Abba Eban · Abba Arikha · Abishai · Abraham · Abraham ibn Ezra · Abraham Isaac Kook · Abraham Joshua Heschel · Absalom · Adar · Adonizedek · Aelia Capitolina · Afula · Agrippa · Ahad Ha'am · Akko, Israel · Albert Einstein · Alan Dershowitz · Aliyah · American Israel Public Affairs Committee (AIPAC) · American Jewish Joint Distribution Committee (JDC or "Joint") · Amidah · AMIA bombing · Amoraim · Amos (prophet) · Anne Frank · Anti-Defamation League · Antisemitic canard · Antisemitism · Antisemitism in Islam · Antisemitism in the Arab world · Anti-Zionism · Anti-Zionist Committee of the Soviet Public · Apostasy in Judaism · Arab al-Mawasi massacre · Arab–Israeli conflict · Arab–Israeli peace projects · Archaeology of Israel · Ariel Sharon · Ark of the Covenant · Armageddon · Arthur Koestler · Asher ben Jehiel · Ashi · Ashkelon · Ashkenazi Hasidim · Ashkenazi Jews · Auschwitz concentration camp · Avraham Stern · Azriel Hildesheimer

== B ==
Baal Shem Tov · Baal teshuva movement · Babylonian captivity · Balaam · Balfour Declaration · Bar-Ilan University · Bar Kokhba · Bar Kokhba revolt · Baraita · Baruch Goldstein · Baruch Spinoza · Beersheba · Beit She'an · Beitar Illit · Bene Israel · Benny Morris · Benjamin Netanyahu · Beta Israel · Bethlehem · Bible · Bible code · Bible conspiracy theory · Biblical Mount Sinai · Bilu (movement) · Birobidzhan · Blood libel · Bnei Brak · B'nai B'rith · Book of Amos · Book of Daniel · Book of Deuteronomy · Book of Esther · Book of Ezekiel · Book of Ezra · Book of Haggai · Book of Jeremiah · Book of Lamentations · Book of Nahum · Book of Nehemiah · Book of Numbers · Books of Kings · Books of the Bible · Brit milah · British mandate of Palestine · B'Tselem

== C ==
Canaan · Cantonist · Cantor · Camp David Accords · Carmeli Brigade · Carmelit · The Case for Israel · Cave of the Patriarchs · Cave of the Patriarchs massacre · Chabad · Chaim Herzog · Chaim Rumkowski · Chaim Weizmann · Cheshvan · Chosen people · Christian–Jewish reconciliation · Christian Zionism · Christianity and anti-Semitism · Churchill White Paper · Conference of Presidents of Major American Jewish Organizations · Conservative Judaism · Conversion to Judaism · Council of Four Lands · Culture of Israel

== D ==
Dabru Emet · Damascus affair · Daniel · Daniel Lewin · Daniel Pipes · Dating the Bible · David · David Ben-Gurion · David Dragunsky · Deborah Lipstadt · Dead Sea Scrolls · Deir Yassin massacre · Dershowitz–Finkelstein affair · Dhimmi · Dimona · Disputation · Doctors' plot · Documentary hypothesis · Dor Daim · Dreyfus affair · Druze · Dushanbe Synagogue

== E ==
Egypt–Israel peace treaty · Ehud Barak · Eilat · Ein Ayala · Eli Cohen · Elie Wiesel · Eli Yishai · Eliezer Ben-Yehuda · Elijah · Elul · Elyakim Rubinstein · Emil Fackenheim · Esther · Etrog · Jew (word) · Exilarch · Exodus · Expulsions and exoduses of Jews · Ezekiel · Ezra

== F ==
Faisal–Weizmann Agreement · First Jewish–Roman War · From Time Immemorial

== G ==
Galilee · Gaza · Gemara · General Jewish Labour Bund · Genesis · Geography of Israel · Gersonides · Ghetto · Ghetto Fighters' House · Givatayim · Givati Brigade · Glückel of Hameln · Golan Heights · Golani Brigade · Golda Meir · Golden age of Jewish culture in Spain · Green Line · Gulf War · Gush Dan

== H ==
Haaretz · Habakkuk · Habima Theatre · Hadassah Women's Zionist Organization of America · Hadassah medical convoy massacre · Hadera · Haganah · Haggadah · Haggai · Haifa · Halakha · Hanukkah · Haredi Judaism · Harry Oppenheimer · Haskalah · Hasideans · Hasidic Judaism · Hatikvah · Haym Salomon · Hebrew alphabet · Hebrew Bible · Hebrew calendar · Hebrew language · Hebrew name · Hebrew numerals · Hebrew University of Jerusalem · Hebron · Hechsher · Heinrich Graetz · Herschel Grynszpan · Herzliya · Hezekiah · Histadrut · Historical Jewish population comparisons · Historicity of the Bible · History of ancient Israel and Judah · History of antisemitism · History of European Jews in the Middle Ages · History of Israel · History of Jerusalem · History of Jewish education in the United States before the 20th century · History of Palestine · History of responsa in Judaism · History of the Israel Defense Forces · History of the Jews and Judaism in the Land of Israel · History of the Jews under Muslim rule · The Holocaust · Holocaust denial · Holocaust theology · Holy Land · Holy of Holies · Homeland for the Jewish people · Hope Simpson Enquiry · Hovevei Zion · Hosea · Hurva Synagogue

== I ==
Ilan Ramon · Immanuel the Roman · IMI Systems · Jewish exodus from Arab and Muslim countries · Intifada (First) · Intifada (Second) · Irgun · Irv Rubin · Isaac · Isaac Abarbanel · Isaac Klein · Isaac Luria · Isaiah · Islamic–Jewish relations · Israel · Israel Border Police · Israel Central Bureau of Statistics · Israel–Jordan peace treaty · Israel Shahak · Israel Zangwill · Israel's Border Wars 1949–1956 · Israeli Air Force · Israeli Declaration of Independence · Israel Defense Forces · Israeli Labor Party · Israeli new shekel · Israeli settlement · Israeli special forces units · Israel–Gaza barrier · Israeli–Lebanese conflict · Israeli–Palestinian conflict · Israeli–Palestinian peace process · Israeli West Bank barrier · Israelites · Itzik Feffer · Iyar

== J ==
Jackson–Vanik amendment · Jacob · Jacob ben Asher (Baal ha-Turim) · Jacob Frank · Jacobi, Carl Gustav · Jaffa riots · Jeconiah · Jeremiah · Jericho · Jerusalem · Jerusalem Law · The Jerusalem Post · Jew (word) · Jewish Anti-Fascist Committee · Jewish Autonomism · Jewish Autonomous Oblast · Jewish Community Center · Jewish Council for Public Affairs · Jewish Defense League · Jewish diaspora · Jewish emancipation · Jewish eschatology · Jewish history · Jewish holidays · Jewish Institute for National Security of America · Jewish insurgency in Mandatory Palestine · Jewish languages · Jewish Legion · Jewish letter carriers · Jewish mythology · Jewish National Council · Jewish partisans · Jewish political movements · Jewish population by country · Jewish prayer · Jewish principles of faith · Jewish religious movements · Jewish–Roman wars · Jewish schisms · Jewish symbolism · Jewish Theological Seminary of America · Jewish Theological Seminary of Breslau · Jewish views on marriage · Jewish views on religious pluralism · Jews · Jews as the chosen people · Joab · Joel · Jonah · Josel of Rosheim · Joseph (Genesis) · Joseph B. Soloveitchik · Joseph Karo Joseph Trumpeldor · Josephus · Joshua · Jubilee (biblical) · Judah · Judah ha-Nasi · Judah Loew ben Bezalel · Judah P. Benjamin · Judaism · Judas Maccabeus · Judea and Samaria Area · Judaeo-Spanish · Judeo-Arabic languages · Judeo-Aramaic languages · Judeo-Berber language · Judensau · Judges

== K ==
Kabbalah · Kach and Kahane Chai · Kafr Qasim massacre · Kahanism · Kaifeng Jews · Karaite Judaism · Karine A affair · Kashrut · Kfar Etzion massacre · Kfar Saba · Kibbutz · Kielce pogrom · King David Hotel bombing · Kingdom of Israel · Kingdom of Judah · Kiryat Shmona Kishinev pogrom · Kislev · Kitniyot · Klezmer · Knesset · Kohen · Kristallnacht

== L ==
Lamentations · Land for peace · Land of Israel · Lavon Affair · Leah Goldberg · Lehi (militant group) · Leviticus · Liberal Judaism · Likud · Lina Stern · List of aircraft of the Israeli Air Force · List of battles and operations in the 1948 Palestine war · List of biblical names · List of cities in Israel · List of Hebrew Bible events · List of Israeli universities and colleges · List of Jewish ethnonyms · List of newspapers in Israel · List of places in Jerusalem · List of United Nations resolutions concerning Israel · List of violent incidents in the Israeli–Palestinian conflict, 2000 · List of violent incidents in the Israeli–Palestinian conflict, 2001 · List of violent incidents in the Israeli–Palestinian conflict, 2002 · List of violent incidents in the Israeli–Palestinian conflict, 2003 · List of violent incidents in the Israeli–Palestinian conflict, 2004 · List of Zionists · Lists of Jews · Lod Airport massacre ·

== M ==
Ma'alot massacre · Maariv · Maccabees · Madrid Conference of 1991 · Madrid peace conference letter of invitation · Maimonides (Rambam) · Malachi · Marrano · Martin Buber · Martin Luther · Martin Luther and antisemitism · Marx, Karl · Masada · Masoretes · Masoretic Text · Matzo · Mawza Exile · Max Nordau · Meir Kahane · Mel Mermelstein · Menachem Begin · Menahem Mendel Beilis · Menachem Mendel Schneerson · Merkava · Messiah · Messianic Judaism · Mesillat Yesharim · Mezuzah · Micah · Michael Dov Weissmandl · Mickey Marcus · Midrash · Mishnah · Modern Orthodox Judaism · Moledet · Mordecai Anielewicz · Mordecai Kaplan · Mordechai Vanunu · Moriah · Mormonism and Judaism · Mortara case · Moscow State Jewish Theatre · Moses · Moshe Chaim Luzzatto · Moses Mendelssohn · Moses Montefiore · Moshav · Mossad · Mount of Olives · Mount Scopus · Mount Sinai · Moshe Carmel · Moshe Dayan · Moshe Sharett · Moshe Ya'alon · MS St. Louis · Munich massacre · Musar movement

== N ==
Nachmanides (Ramban) · Nahal Brigade · Nahariya · Nahum · Names of Jerusalem · Nashim · Nathan Mayer Rothschild · Nathan (prophet) · National Religious Party · Nazareth · Near Eastern archaeology · Negev · Nehemiah · Netanya · Neturei Karta · New Historians · Niels Bohr · Nisan · Nizkor Project · Noah's Ark · Noam Chomsky · Norman Finkelstein · Norman Lamm · Nosson Tzvi Finkel · Nuremberg Laws

== O ==
Obadiah · Odessa Committee · Old City (Jerusalem) · Old Synagogue (Erfurt) · Old Testament · On the Jews and Their Lies · Operation Defensive Shield · Operation Entebbe · Oral Torah · Orthodox Judaism · Oslo Accords · Oslo I Accord · Ovadia Yosef · OZET

== P ==
Pale of Settlement · Palestine · Palestinian exodus · Palestinian political violence · Palmach · Paradesi Jews · Paratroopers Brigade · Passover massacre · Patriarchal age · Peace Now · Peel Commission · Persian Jews · Passover · Petah Tikva · Pharisees · Plan Dalet · Pogrom · Polina Zhemchuzhina · Population groups in Israel · Primeval history · Promised Land · Protocols of the Elders of Zion · Purim · Psalms

== Q ==
Qibya massacre ·

== R ==
Ra'anana · Rabbi · Rabbi Akiva · Rabbinical Assembly · Rabbinic authority · Rabbinic literature · Ramat Gan · Rashi · Reconstructionist Judaism · Reform Judaism · Rehavam Ze'evi · Rehoboam · Rehovot · Relationship of American Jews to the U.S. Federal Government before the 20th century · Relationships between Jewish religious movements · Religious significance of Jerusalem · Religious Zionism · Rescue of the Danish Jews · Right to exist · Rishon LeZion · Robert Fisk · Rootless cosmopolitan · Rosh Hashanah · Ruth

== S ==
Saadia Gaon · Sabbatai Zevi · Sabbath · Safed · Saharon Shelah · Samaria · Samaritans · Samuel · San Remo conference · Sanhedrin · Saul · Saul Lieberman · Savoraim · Science and technology in Israel · Sderot · Second Temple · Secular Jewish culture · Seder · Semitic people · Sephardi Jews · Sephardic Haredim · Sephardic music · Septuagint · Seventeenth of Tammuz · Shavuot · Shayetet 13 · Shebaa farms · Shemini Atzeret · Sh'erit ha-Pletah · Shevat · Shimon Peres · Shin Bet (Shabak) · Shiva · Shmuel HaNavi bus bombing · Shmuel Yosef Agnon · Shneur Zalman of Liadi · Shofar · Sholem Aleichem · Shtadlan · Shtetl · Shulchan Aruch · Sicarii · Siddur · Simon bar Kokhba · Simon Dubnow · Simon Wiesenthal · Simon Wiesenthal Center · Sivan · Six-Day War · Slánský trial · Solomon · Solomon's Temple · Solomon Mikhoels · Solomon Schechter · Soviet anti-Zionism · Star of David · Suez Crisis · Sukkot · Sykes–Picot Agreement · Władysław Szpilman ·

== T ==
Ta'anit · Tabernacle · Tallit · Talmud · Tammuz · Tannaim · Tanya Reinhart · Targum · Technion – Israel Institute of Technology · Tel Aviv · Tel Hai · Tel Lachish · Temple in Jerusalem · Temple Mount · Ten Commandments · Tenth of Tevet · Tevet · Tevye · The Black Book of Soviet Jewry · Theodor Herzl · Tiberias · Timeline of Jerusalem · Timeline of Jewish history · Timeline of the Israeli–Palestinian conflict · Timeline of Zionism · Tisha B'Av · Tishrei · Torah · Tosefta · Trans-Israel pipeline · Tribe of Asher · Tribe of Benjamin · Tribe of Dan · Tribe of Ephraim · Tribe of Gad · Tribe of Issachar · Tribe of Joseph · Tribe of Judah · Tribe of Levi · Tribe of Manasseh · Tribe of Naphtali · Tribe of Reuben · Tribe of Simeon · Tribe of Zebulun · Tuqu' · Twelve Minor Prophets ·

== U ==
UN Security Council Resolution 242 · UN Security Council Resolution 338 · UN Security Council Resolution 425 · UN Security Council Resolution 478 · United Nations General Assembly Resolution 3379 · United Nations Partition Plan for Palestine · United Torah Judaism · Uri Avnery · Useful Jew · Uzi

== V ==
Valley of Rephaim · Vasily Grossman · Vilna Gaon ·

== W ==
Waldemar Haffkine · War of Attrition · West Bank · Western Wall · White Paper of 1939 · Who is a Jew? · World Jewish Congress

== Y ==
Yamam · Yavne · Yedioth Ahronoth · Yehoshua Porath · Yehuda Bauer · Yehuda Halevi · Yellow badge · Yemenite Jews · Yesha · Yeshiva · Yeshiva University · Yevsektsiya · Yiddish · Yiftach Brigade · Yigal Allon · Yigal Amir · Yishuv · Yisrael Meir Kagan · Yitzhak Rabin · Yitzhak Shamir · Yohanan ben Zakkai · Yom Kippur · Yom Kippur War · Yonatan Netanyahu · Yosef Yitzchak Schneersohn ·

== Z ==
Zadok · ZAKA · Zealots · Zechariah (Hebrew prophet) · Zechariah ben Jehoiada · Zechariah of Israel · Zephaniah · Ze'ev Jabotinsky · Zikhron Ya'akov · Zion · Zionism · Zohar
