= B'nai Reuben Anshe Sfard =

Former synagogue in South Philadelphia (1905-1956)

- Hebrew: בית הכנסת הגדול דחברה בני ראובן אנשי ספרד
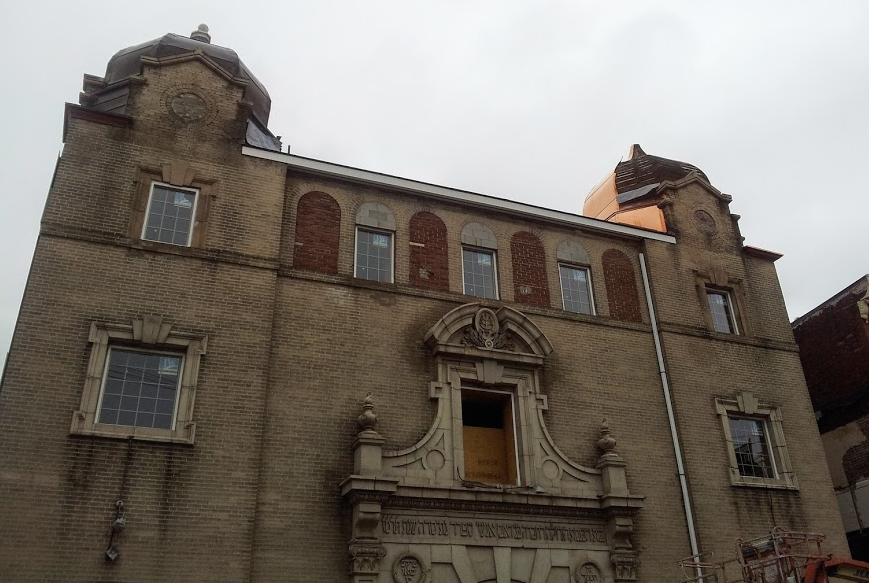
- The former synagogue, in 2014

- Location of the former synagogue in Philadelphia

Religion
- Affiliation: Orthodox Judaism (former)
- Rite: Nusach Sefard
- Ecclesiastical or organizational status: Synagogue (1883–1956); Antique outlet (1985–2013); Condominiuma (since 2015)
- Status: Inactive

Location
- Location: 615 S 6th Street, Philadelphia, Pennsylvania
- Country: United States
- Interactive map of B'nai Reuben Anshe Sfard
- Coordinates: 39°56′29″N 75°09′08″W

Architecture
- Architects: Charles W. Bolton & Sons (1904)
- Type: Synagogue architecture
- Style: Baroque Revival
- General contractor: Design Development Construction (2014)
- Established: 1883 (as a congregation)
- Groundbreaking: 1904
- Completed: 1905
- Construction cost: $60,000 (1905)

Specifications
- Direction of façade: West
- Capacity: 1,600

B'nai Reuben Anshe Sfard (Hebrew: בית הכנסת הגדול דחברה בני ראובן אנשי ספרד) is a former Orthodox Jewish congregation and synagogue located in the Queen Village neighborhood of Center City Philadelphia, Pennsylvania, in the United States. The congregation was founded in 1883. In 1904, the congregation constructed a synagogue at 615 S 6th Street near South Street in the city's Jewish quarter. The congregation vacated the synagogue building in 1956.

The synagogue building was home to the Antiquarian's Delight antique market from 1985 to 2013. The building was renovated and converted to condominiums in 2015.

== History ==
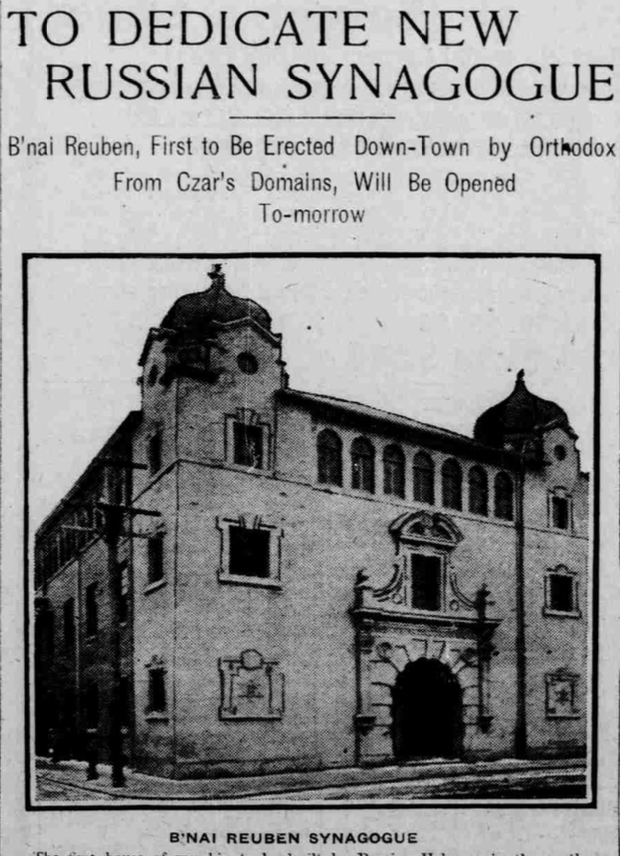
B'nai Reuben, Philadelphia Inquirer, January 7, 1905

The congregation was established in 1883 and chartered in 1888 by Reuben Kanefsky. It is considered the city's first Hasidic synagogue. Congregants met at member homes at 730 E Passyunk Avenue and 240 Monroe Street.

Founded by Reuben Manebsky. Met at member homes - 730 Passyunk Ave & 240 Monroe St - until use of own synagogue at 620 Minister St in 1888. This building was sold in the 90's to Anshe Zitomer. New Synagogue built at 6th & Kater built in 1904. Roman Baroque & East European elements. Subsequently, The Antiquarian Delight, an indoor antiques market. [1901 lists a Barditchiefner [Berditchev] Verein. Members from Berditch, Pizhin and Tolener.]

In 1888, B'nai Reuben purchased the Union Baptist Church's 500 seat building at 620 Addison Street (formerly Minster Street). By 1900, B'nai Reuben had 150 members and 200 seatholders, and offered daily, Sabbath, and holy day services.

In 1905, B'nai Reuben sold their 620 Addison Street property, Union Baptist Church's first home, to the City of Philadelphia for $10,000. The city demolished the church and created a schoolyard for the adjacent public school, James Forten Elementary Manual Training School.

The American Architect and Building News in 1900 reported that the congregation had “purchased the houses at 928, 930, and 932 S. 6th St. and will erect a commodious synagogue on the site.” The congregation would not erect its new Baroque Revival building at this site and instead laid a cornerstone at 615 S 6th Street at Kater Street in 1904.

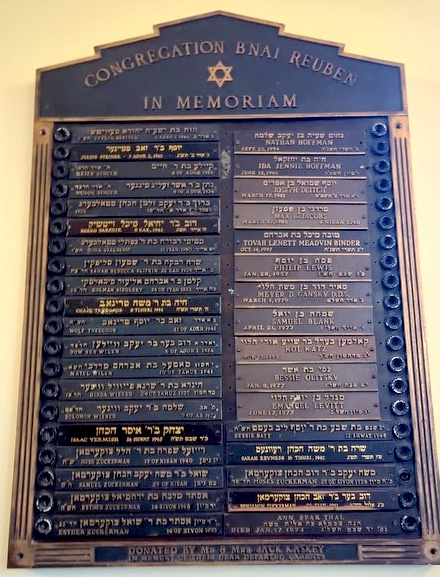
Bnai Reuben memorial plaque at the Vilna Congregation (January 2026)

The new building was dedicated on January 8, 1905. The ceremony began at B'nai Abraham where the honors of opening the doors to the new building were auctioned. 6,000 people accompanied the procession of the Torahs, American flag, and "blue and white flag of the Hebrews" to the new building where 2,500 crowded into the new building. A representative of the Mayor of Philadelphia spoke, as did Rabbi Bernard Levinthal, Rabbi AH Erschler, Rabbi Englander, Rabbi M Brenner, and prominent businessman and Jewish community leader Jacob Lit. The building sat 1,600 for services, and the basement assembly room accommodated 300 people, and also included three classrooms. The building would cost $60,000 to construct.

The shul was home to the Tolner Rebbe in 1910s. Philadelphia's hasidim, according to M. Freeman, were generally followers of the Berditchev and Pizhiner Rebbes.

The synagogue was visited by tragedy in October 1929 when its president Simon Braman, a civic and business leader in woolens, despondent over business losses, took his own life in the building's meeting room.

The congregation occupied the building until 1956. Many of the synagogue's memorial plaques were transferred to the Vilna Congregation.

== Subsequent uses ==
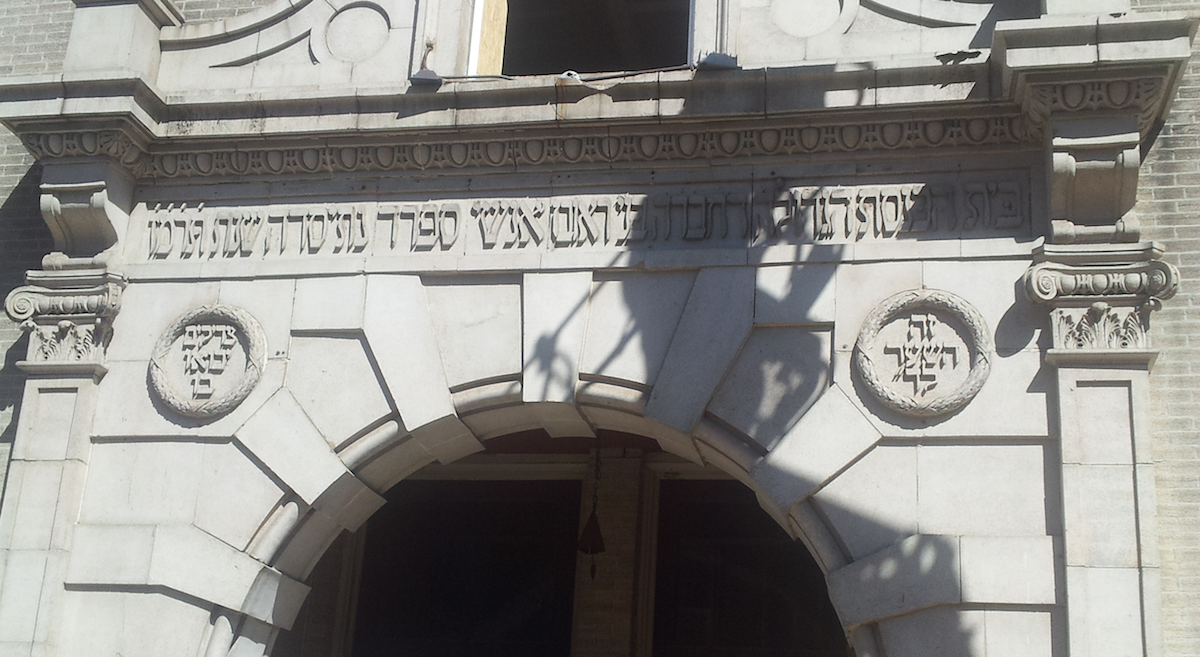
April 24, 2014

Antiquarian's Delight operated on the ground floor and basement of the synagogue beginning in 1985. The upper sanctuary was closed to the public and became a storehouse. The second floor windows rotted and broke, and became open to the elements and animals. Merchandise became covered with years of pigeon guano, and dead and decaying pigeons.

In July 2013, the Antiquarian's Delight closed. The building property was sold to the Fetfafzes family, owners of area businesses in November 2012 for $1.1 million.

The Farfetzes converted the building into 13 apartments. Philadelphia's Department of Licenses and Inspections issued an alteration permit in November 2013. The building has a leasing office on the ground floor, storage space for the tenants in the basement, and a penthouse for mechanical equipment.

== See also ==
- History of Jews in Philadelphia
- List of synagogues in Pennsylvania
