= Vilna Congregation =

Synagogue in Philadelphia

- Hebrew: בית הכנסת אנשי ווילנה
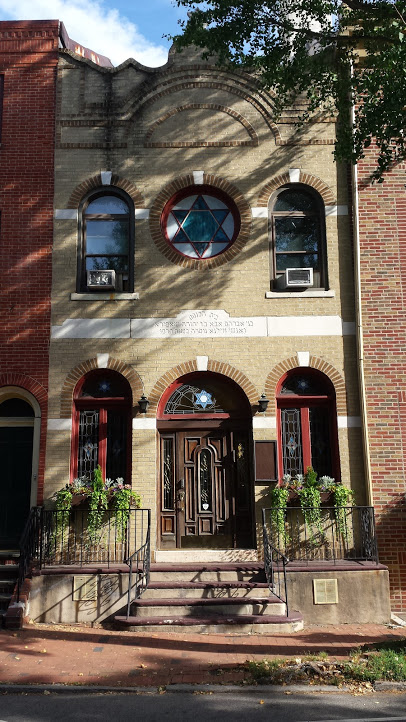
- The synagogue, in 2015

- Location in Philadelphia

Religion
- Affiliation: Orthodox Judaism
- Rite: Chabad-Lubavitch; Nusach Sefard
- Ecclesiastical or organizational status: Synagogue
- Leadership: Rabbi Menachem Schmidt
- Year consecrated: 1915
- Status: Active

Location
- Location: 509 Pine Street, Philadelphia, Pennsylvania 19106
- Country: United States
- Interactive map of Vilna Congregation
- Coordinates: 39°56′38″N 75°09′03″W

Architecture
- Type: Chabad
- Style: Philadelphia Rowhouse
- Established: 1904 (as a congregation)
- Completed: 1915

Specifications
- Direction of façade: South
- Capacity: 75 worshippers

Website
- vilnaphilly.org

The Vilna Congregation (Hebrew: בית הכנסת אנשי ווילנה) is an Orthodox Jewish congregation and synagogue, located in the Society Hill section of Center City, Philadelphia, Pennsylvania, in the United States. The synagogue was traditionally home to an active Hasidic Ashkenazi congregation that held Shabbat and holy day services, was affiliated with Lubavitch of Center City. In more recent years, the synagogue became the home of an Orthodox women's mikvah run by the Lubavitch Hasidic community.

Rabbi Menachem Schmidt is the rabbi of the congregation, and he oversees the property and its operations.

== History ==
=== Early 1900s to 1974 ===
The Vilna Congregation began in 1904 as a Landsleit shul for Lithuanian Jewish immigrants in Philadelphia. The congregation held services in rented rooms until 1915, when the building on 509 Pine Street was purchased by the Shapiro family. The building was registered as a synagogue on February 1, 1922. Prior to its purchase by the Shapiro family in 1915, the building was the residence of Julius Taussig. The Shapiro family was in the hardware business in the 1920s, at which time the women members organized the Sara Shapiro Sisterhood.

The stone above the front doorway reads, in Hebrew: בית הכנסת בני אברהם אבא ב'ר יהודה שאפירא ואנשי ווילנה נוסדה בשנת תרס׳, lit. 'The Avraham Aba Bar Shapira and Men of Vilna Synagogue established in the year 5665'.

Joseph Hillel Snapir (1884—1971) served as synagogue rabbi in the 1950s and 1960s. The congregation welcomed the memorial plaques from B'nai Reuben Anshe Sfard when the congregation closed in 1956.

The synagogue held its own daily services until 1974 at which time it decided to hold only Shabbat services. By the late 1980s, the Vilna Congregation's membership continued to contract and they struggled to gather a minyan by the mid-1980s.

=== Since the late 1980s ===
Rabbi Menachem Schmidt was appointed in 1989, and began reviving the congregation as a community shul where he led services, hosted meals, and taught. The synagogue conducted services every Friday night for both the Vilna congregation and Congregation B'nai Abraham until 2018. On Shabbos mornings and holy days, the Vilna shul held a “late morning” minyan with a festive kiddish following services in the building's second floor community space.

The building is the proposed site of a Center City mikvah, Mai Shalva. Community members, led by Rabbi Menachem Schmidt, organized a group in 2013 called the Center City Community Mikvah, selected a site, commissioned architectural plans and began to raise funds.

== See also ==
- History of the Jews in Pennsylvania
