= Alfred T. Jones =

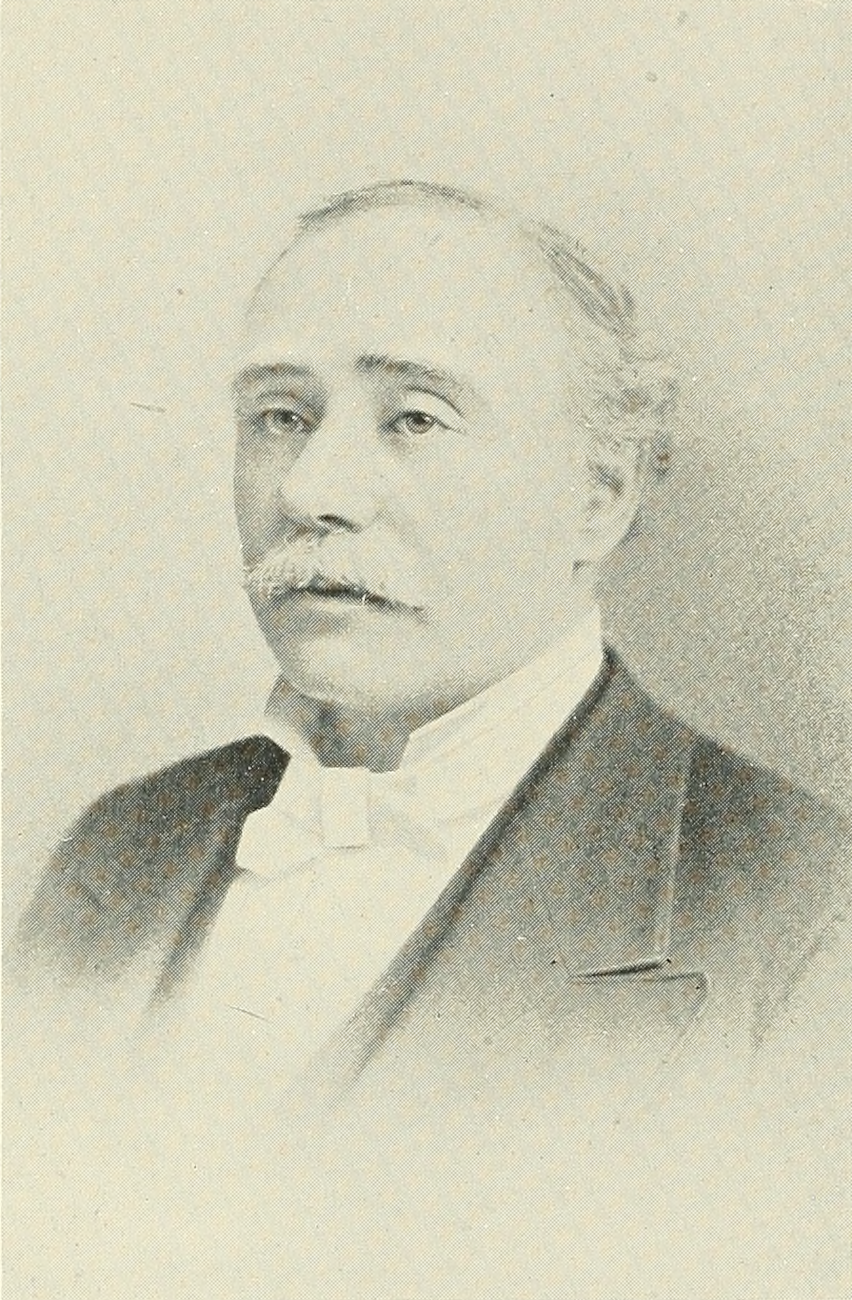

Personal life
- Born: July 4, 1822 Boston, Massachusetts
- Died: October 3, 1888 (aged 66) Philadelphia, Pennsylvania
- Buried: Mikveh Israel Cemetery
- Spouse: Jessica Lyons (m. 1844)

Religious life
- Religion: Judaism

Alfred Timons Jones (July 4, 1822 – October 3, 1888) was an American newspaper editor, lithographer, and Jewish communal leader based in Philadelphia.

== Early Life and Background ==
Alfred Jones was born in Boston, Massachusetts, in 1822, the only son of Andrew A. Jones (1777–1850), an immigrant from Amsterdam, and his second wife, Miriam (Maria) Marks. His mother was the granddaughter of Moses Isaacks of Newport, Rhode Island, who served during the American Revolutionary War. The surname "Jones" is a patronymic derived from Alfred's paternal grandfather, Jonah.

== Career ==
Jones was educated in New York City, before moving to Philadelphia in 1842, initially working in the wholesale clothing trade. Around 1859, he entered the printing industry, forming a partnership with Rudolph Stein, a Prussian-Jewish immigrant. Together they operated Stein & Jones, a lithography firm specializing in trade cards.

After leaving the firm in 1868, Jones co-founded a photographic studio with John Gihon the following year. This venture lasted until 1871, when Stein's death prompted Jones to return to printing. He then partnered with Theodore B. Potsdamer in establishing Jones & Potsdamer, continuing his work in lithography until 1875.

That year, Jones launched The Jewish Record, a weekly newspaper aimed at the Jewish community. The publication was the first successful Jewish periodical in Philadelphia and operated under his editorship until it ceased publication in 1886.

== Community Involvement ==
Jones was the secretary of the first iteration of the Jewish Publication Society (organized 1845), president of the Jewish Benevolent Society and of the Hebrew Society for the Visitation of the Sick and Mutual Assistance, manager of the Hebrew Relief Society, secretary of the Fuel Society, director of the United Hebrew Charities, member of the advisory board of the Jewish Foster Home, and secretary and vice-president of the Hebrew Education Society. Jones was first president of the Jewish Hospital Association, first president of the Jewish Immigrants' Aid Society, and president of the Congregation Beth-El-Emeth, all in Philadelphia.

Jones was also a prominent Freemason. He joined Shekinah Lodge, No. 246, in 1854. He quickly rose through the ranks, becoming Worshipful Master in 1856 and serving as Secretary from 1857 until his death—a tenure of over 30 years.

== Personal life and death ==
Jones was married to Jessica née Lyons (c. 1823–1894), with whom he had five children. The family resided at 1303 Marshall Street in Philadelphia.

He died at home on October 3, 1888, and was buried at the 55th Street Cemetery. His funeral service was conducted by Rabbi Sabato Morais.
