= Louis E. Levinthal =

Jewish-American lawyer & judge (1892-1976)

Louis Edward Levinthal (April 5, 1892 – May 16, 1976) was a Jewish-American lawyer and judge from Philadelphia.

== Formative years and family ==
Levinthal was born on April 5, 1892, in Philadelphia, Pennsylvania, the son of Bernard L. Levinthal and Minna Kleinberg. His father was a prominent Orthodox rabbi from Lithuania, and his brother Israel H. Levinthal was a rabbi in Brooklyn, New York.

Levinthal attended the Central High School from 1906 to 1910. He graduated from the University of Pennsylvania with an A.B. in 1914 and from the University of Pennsylvania Law School with an LL.B. in 1916 and an LL.M. in 1918. He was editor of the University of Pennsylvania Law Review, a leader of the Inter-Collegiate Zionist Society and Menorah, earned numerous undergraduate honors, and received the Gowen Memorial Fellowship for post-graduate studies at the Law School. The university published his History of Bankruptcy Law and his study on the opinions of Judge Mayer Sulzberger.

In 1916, he married Lenore Chodoff. Their children were Sylvia Betty (wife of Herbert I. Bernstein) and Cyrus.

== Career and activism ==
Levinthal was admitted to the bar in 1916. He was a member of the Philadelphia County Board of Law Examiners from 1917 to 1937, a lecturer on bankruptcy and corporate reorganization at the University of Pennsylvania Law School from 1933 to 1936, a member of the Pennsylvania Governor's Commission on Constitutional Revision in 1935, and special counsel to the Public Service Commission of Pennsylvania for the reorganization of the Philadelphia Rapid Transit from 1935 to 1937. He was a judge of the Pennsylvania Court of Common Pleas from 1937 to 1959, after which he retired as judge and worked as a counsel for Dilworth, Paxson, Kohn & Dilks. Secretary of War Robert P. Patterson appointed him General Lucius D. Clay's advisor on Jewish affairs in June 1947. He held that position until January 1948.

Levinthal was a member of the Aids of Zion in Philadelphia when he was young, and ever since he was active in Jewish life and communal causes. He was elected president of the Philadelphia Zionist district in 1924, and in 1929 he was chairman of the American Palestine Appeal of Philadelphia. A member of the Zionist Organization of America national administrative council, he was elected chairman of the council in 1939 and was unanimously elected president of the Organization in 1941. He was also president of the Associated Talmud Torahs of Philadelphia for five years, a director of the Federation of Jewish Charities and the Allied Jewish Appeal of Philadelphia for many years, a trustee of Congregation Mikveh Israel, a director and executive committee member of the non-sectarian Public Charities Association of Pennsylvania and the United Charities Campaign of Philadelphia, a vice-president of the American Association for Jewish Education, a board member of the United Synagogue of America, and chairman of the board of governors of Hebrew University from 1962 to 1966. Active in the Jewish Publication Society of America, he served as chairman of its publication committee from 1939 to 1949 and from 1954 to 1962 as well as its president from 1949 to 1954.

Levinthal was a member of the World Zionist Congress Court from 1946 to 1956, president of Gratz College in 1945, national chairman of the Guardians of Israel from 1954 to 1959, co-chairman of the United Jewish Appeal, vice-president of the American Fund for Palestinian Institutions, Philadelphia regional chairman of the National Conference of Christians and Jews from 1957 to 1960, honorary president of the American Jewish League for Israel, praesidium member of the American Jewish Conference from 1942 to 1943, chairman of the Brandeis Lawyers Society, and a member of the American Law Institute, the Order of the Coif, Phi Beta Kappa, Sigma Alpha Mu, the American Political Science Association, the American Bar Association, the Pennsylvania Bar Association, and the Philadelphia Bar Association.

== Later years and death ==
Levinthal moved to Jerusalem in 1971. He died there on May 16, 1976. Representative William J. Green III entered tributes to him in the Congressional Record.
