= History of Jewish education in the United States before the 20th century =

The history of Jewish education in the United States before the 20th century is as old as the United States itself; it is a part of overall U.S. Jewish history.

That history begins early in the history of the first Jewish congregation in New York. Attached to that congregation was a school in which secular as well as Hebrew subjects were taught. It was one of the earliest general schools in America; poor children received tuition-free instruction.

Religious instruction was established in connection with most of the early synagogues. For ordinary secular education American Jews resorted, in large measure, to the nonsectarian schools and colleges. There was a Jewish matriculate at the University of Pennsylvania, for instance, as early as 1772. The older communities, however, before the general establishment of the public school system, frequently provided regular instruction in secular subjects. These schools ordinarily were adjuncts of the religious schools maintained by the congregations.

In Philadelphia as early as 1838 a general Sunday school, without congregational affiliation, was established, largely through the efforts of Rebecca Gratz, who was its superintendent and president until 1864. This was the beginning of a movement, which has spread throughout the country, for the organization of educational work along lines quite independent of congregational activities.

== Free Schools ==
A similar school was organized in Charleston, South Carolina in the same year; in the following year, one in Richmond, Virginia; in 1845 this movement spread to New York, being taken up first by the Emanu-El Society, although the Shearith Israel congregation had started a Hebrew-school system as early as 1808. In 1848 the Hebrew Education Society was founded at Philadelphia—originally a school for general instruction in the ordinary branches up to and through the grammar-school grade, together with instruction in Hebrew and in the Jewish religion.

In 1864 the Hebrew Free School Association was incorporated in New York; and throughout various states of the Union a movement gradually spread for the organization of free religious schools which would bring into a common-school system children from the various congregations in each city. These were largely intended to supersede the private institutions that had hitherto existed. They were, in the main, carried on by volunteer teachers; and their distinguishing feature was that the instruction was usually conducted by native-born persons and in the English language, as against the German teaching in the congregational schools.

== Technical Schools ==
The whole trend of this educational work was toward the unification of the community and the broadening of the interests of the individual members, with a tendency to overcome the narrowness of the congregational life that had prevailed, wherein Religious schools and Sabbath-schools have been organized in connection with individual congregations. Particular stress is laid upon them by the congregations, which derive from them much of their communal strength. While many of the Hebrew education societies and schools continue in existence, they do not develop or flourish as might be expected; in fact, since 1882 they have largely taken upon themselves an entirely new function. With the sudden arrival in the United States of a large number of Russian Jews having no knowledge of the English language, and in many cases without any particular handicraft, there devolved upon the American Jewish community the necessity of providing

- day- and night-schools for teaching English to the new arrivals, and
- manual-training and technical schools.

These have been established in New York, Philadelphia, Chicago, and other cities, more or less with the aid of the Baron de Hirsch Fund. The most noteworthy of these educational institutions called into existence since the Russian immigration began is the Educational Alliance of New York.

== Theological Institutions ==
Until recently provision for higher education on specifically Jewish lines was not found practicable, though as early as 1840 the versatile and suggestive Mordecai M. Noah urged the formation of a Jewish college in the United States. His project met with no response. Nor was I. M. Wise more successful when in 1855 he endeavored to establish a theological college in Cincinnati under the name of "Zion Collegiate Institute."

In 1867 the scholarly and enterprising Isaac Leeser, however, established Maimonides College at Philadelphia. It was intended that general collegiate instruction should be provided there, though naturally the Jewish branches were to be given particular attention. A certain measure of cooperation with the University of Pennsylvania was planned, and the idea held in mind was that the college should serve as the capstone to the scheme of education built by the Hebrew Education Society. The college was, however, much ahead of the times, and after a few years of languishing life passed out of existence.

Not until nearly twenty years thereafter was the first institution for the training of rabbis and teachers founded. This was the Hebrew Union College of Cincinnati, established in 1875 by the Union of American Hebrew Congregations, an organization created at that time for the purpose, and mainly at the instance of Rabbi Isaac Mayer Wise. The existence of the college has been continuous, and, though theoretically without partisan bias, it is practically the representative of the Reform wing in America. Graduates from this institution are to be found in charge of congregations in nearly every city of importance in the country. Rev. Dr. K. Kohler is president (1905), and there is a faculty of ten professors and several instructors.

In 1886 there was established in New York the Jewish Theological Seminary, also for the training of rabbis and teachers, and representing the Orthodox wing of the community. The reorganization which this institution underwent in 1901-2 resulted in the calling of Dr. S. Schechter to its presidency. At the same time it was richly endowed, and in 1903 took possession of a new building, the gift of Jacob H. Schiff. Its library, largely the gift of Judge Mayer Sulzberger, contains one of the greatest collections of Hebraica.

In 1895, through a trust vested by Hyman Gratz of the Congregation Mikveh Israel, Gratz College was founded in Philadelphia, which is devoted to the preparation of teachers for Jewish schools. The first President of Gratz College is the famous Jewish educator, Moses Aaron Dropsie.

The largest sum ever made available for the promotion of Semitic investigation is that bequeathed in 1905 by Moses A. Dropsie of Philadelphia for the establishment of a Jewish college along broad lines, for instruction "in the Hebrew and cognate languages and their respective literatures, and in the rabbinical learning and literature." The amount of this bequest is about $800,000.

Throughout the United States there have been established in connection with the various congregations, and also independently, Young Men's Hebrew Associations (YMHA) and other societies which are to a certain extent educational in their character. They usually maintain small libraries and provide lecture-courses on secular and religious topics.

In 1893 there was founded the Jewish Chautauqua Society, which has branches all over the country and bears the same relation to the regular schools and colleges as does the University Extension movement, as interpreted in America, to regular colleges for university work.

The Council of Jewish Women has engaged to a considerable extent in educational work among its own members. In 1886 the Reform wing of American Jewry organized at Cincinnati a Hebrew Sabbath-School Union for the purpose of promoting uniformity and approved methods in Sabbath-school instruction.

As of 1900, there were in the United States 415 Jewish educational organizations, 291 of which were religious schools attached to congregations, with 1,127 teachers and an attendance of about 25,000 pupils. There were also 27 Jewish free schools, chiefly in large cities, with about 11,000 pupils and 142 teachers.
