= Mikveh Israel Cemetery (Beth El Emeth) =

Jewish cemetery in West Philadelphia, US

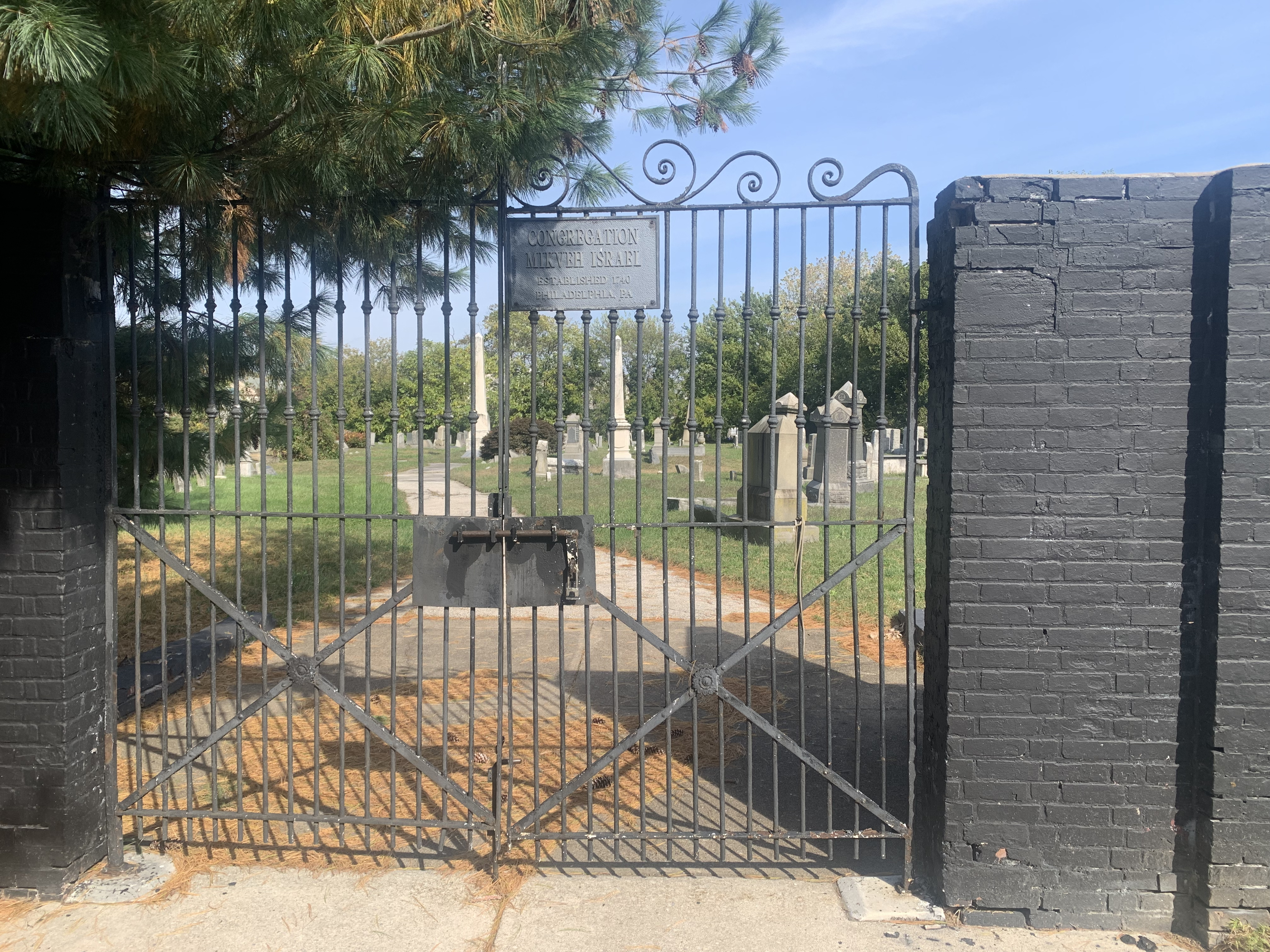
- Mikveh Israel Cemetery Beth El Emeth, Market St between 54th and 55th Streets (October 2025)
- Interactive map of Mikveh Israel Cemetery (Beth El Emeth)

Details
- Established: 1850
- Location: 55th and Market Streets; Philadelphia, Pennsylvania
- Country: United States
- Coordinates: 39°57′40″N 75°13′49″W
- Type: Jewish
- Owned by: Beth El Emeth (1857-1895); Congregation Mikveh Israel (1895-present)
- Find a Grave: Mikveh Israel Cemetery

The Mikveh Israel Cemetery Beth-El-Emeth at 55th and Market Streets is a Jewish cemetery in West Philadelphia founded in 1850 and dedicated in 1857 by Isaac Leeser’s Congregation Beth-El-Emeth as Beth-El-Emeth Cemetery (Hebrew: בית אל אמת).

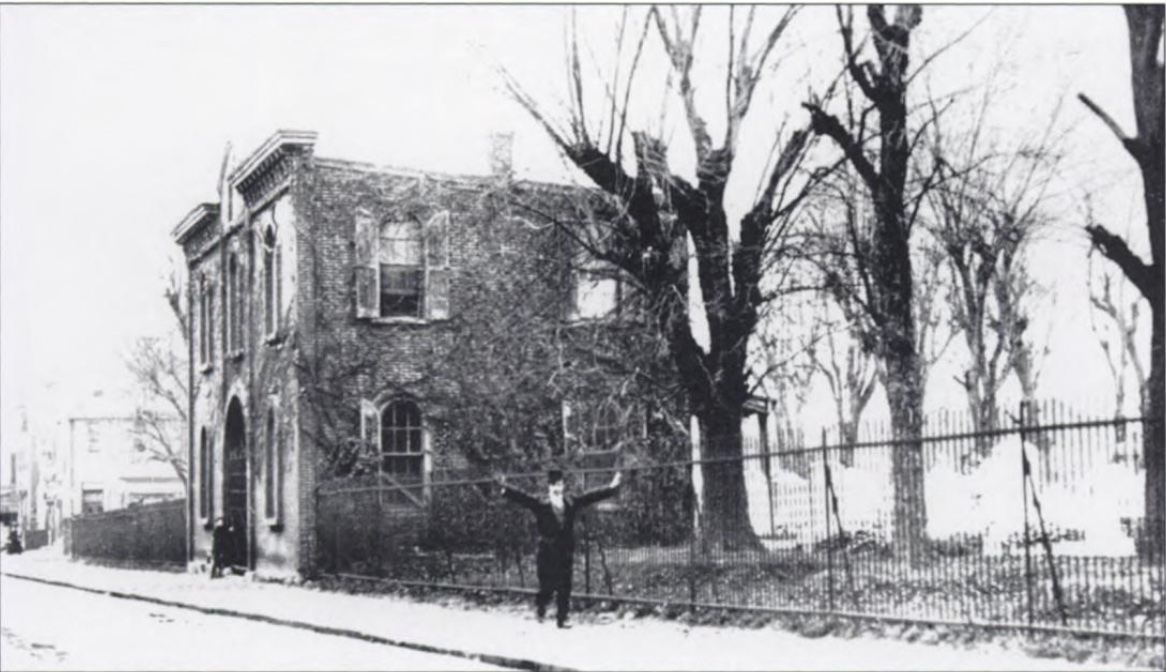
Mikveh Israel Cemetery Beth El Emeth with original gatehouse in 1909

Kahal Kadosh Beth-El-Emeth “Holy Congregation of the True God” (or “God of Truth”) was founded in 1857 by Joseph Newhouse as a pulpit for Rev. Isaac Leeser after Leeser left Congregation Mikveh Israel. The congregation followed the "Spanish & Portuguese" rite despite most members hailing from Germany. They met in a former church on the east side of Franklin Street above Green Street in the Northern Liberties neighborhood. Many of its members had formerly belonged to Mikveh Israel and rejoined it when Beth-El-Emeth dissolved itself in 1897. Congregation Mikveh Israel took possession of the Beth El Emeth Cemetery in 1895.

Rev. Leeser died on February 1, 1868, and was interred on February 4, 1868. The procession proceeded from his residence at 1227 Walnut St, past Mikveh Israel and Rodeph Shalom to Beth El Emeth where the service was conducted. The procession than continued to West Philadelphia and the cemetery. The burial was officiated by Mikveh Israel's Rev. Sabato Morais and Beth El Emeth's Rev. Pereira. It was announced at the service that the executors of Rev. Leeser's would retain the right to remove his body to another Jewish cemetery should the Beth El Emeth cemetery ever pass out of Jewish hands. To date, Rev. Leeser's body remains in the cemetery.

The cemetery once included its own stand alone chapel at which funeral services were conducted prior to internment.

Dr Cyrus Adler died in 1940 and amongst his will was a bequeathment for the care of the Adler family plots at the cemetery.

In May 1954, vandals who had been drinking in the cemetery, overturned 33 headstones, leaving behind beer and wine bottles.

The City of Philadelphia erected a historic marker near the cemetery's location in 1998 to recognize Reverend Leeser and his contributions as a teacher and scholar.

The cemetery is also referred to as Congregation Mikveh Israel's third cemetery.

== Burials ==
Veterans of the Civil War are interred here along with other prominent members of the Philadelphia Jewish community.

- Reverend Isaac Leeser (1806-1868) Philadelphia Jewish Leader, Educator, and Publisher. Rabbi of Congregation Beth-El-Emeth.
- Rabbi George Jacobs (1834-1884), Rabbi of Congregation Beth-El Emeth.
- Rabbi Eliezer Kleinberg, Rabbi, Cong B’nai Abraham Anshe Russia, Philadelphia. Co-founder of the Orthodox Union.
- Rabbi Dov Aryeh Leventhal (1864-1952) Chief Rabbi Philadelphia. Son-in-law of Rabbi Eliezer Kleinberg.
- Rabbi Yisroel Moshe Saks, First Rabbi, Cong B’nai Abraham Anshe Russia, Philadelphia.

== See also ==
- Mikveh Israel Cemetery, 831 Spruce Street, Philadelphia
- Mikveh Israel Cemetery (Federal Street Burial Ground), 11th and Federal Streets, Philadelphia
