= Isaac Leeser =

American rabbi and journalist

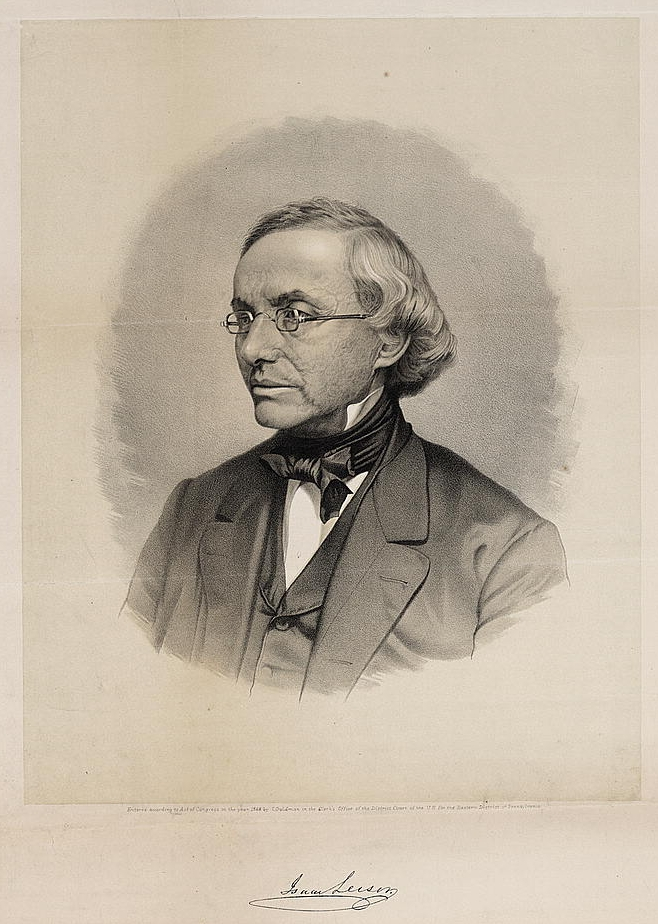
- Born: December 12, 1806; Neuenkirchen/Rheine, Westphalia (present-day Germany)
- Died: February 1, 1868 (aged 61); Philadelphia, Pennsylvania, US

Isaac Leeser (December 12, 1806 – February 1, 1868) was an American Orthodox Jewish religious leader, teacher, scholar and publisher. He helped found the Jewish press of America, produced the first Jewish translation of the Bible into English, and helped organize various social and educational organizations. He is considered one of the most important nineteenth century American Jewish personalities. He was "fiercely opposed" to Reform Judaism and was regarded as one of the most important "orthodox" rabbis of his era. Leeser is regarded as a forerunner by both Modern Orthodox Judaism and Conservative Judaism.

== Early life ==
Isaac Leeser was born to Sarah Leeser and her husband Leffman Leeser in Neuenkirchen/Rheine, Westphalia, but his parents died when he was young. His grandmother encouraged his religious studies under the guidance of the chief rabbi of Münster. Young Leeser was educated at the primary school in nearby Dülmen and then at a gymnasium in Münster. This gave him a solid grounding in Latin, German, and Hebrew. He also studied the Talmud tractates Moed, Bava Metzia, and portions of Kodashim and Bava Batra.

== Career ==
Young Leeser emigrated to America and arrived at Richmond, Virginia in May 1824. His uncle, Zalma Rehiné (1757-1843), a respected merchant in that city, sent Leeser to a private school to learn English, but after ten weeks the school closed. Leeser worked in his uncle's counting-room for five years. He also assisted the hazzan by teaching religion on Saturdays and Sundays, as well as by defending Judaism in the public press when it was assailed.

=== Philadelphia's Congregation Mikveh Israel ===
In 1828, Leeser published a letter in the Richmond Whig which used Jewish history to respond to an anti-Semitic article in the London Quarterly. This attracted the attention of the Jewish communities of Richmond as well as Philadelphia. About that time Abraham Israel Keys, who had served as hazzan of Congregation Mikveh Israel in Philadelphia for four years, died. Leeser accepted the congregation's invitation to serve as his successor, although several previous hazzans had been Sephardic Jews while he was an Ashkenazi Jew. Six years later, he discussed his rationale in a letter to Rabbi Solomon Hirschell of London: "Knowing my own want of proper qualification, I would never have consented to serve, if others more fitting in point of standing, information, or other qualities had been here; but this not being the case (as is proved by there being yet two congregations at least in this country without a regular hazzan), I consented to serve."

In August, 1829, Leeser arrived in Philadelphia with the manuscript of his first book (The Jews and the Mosaic Law). He also brought fresh ideas about his new job. Until that time, a hazzan in America mostly led the congregation in Hebrew prayers, and Rev. Keys had been known for his fine voice. Leeser was aware however that Rev. Gershom Mendes Seixas, the synagogue's first rabbi and congregation founder had delivered sermons in English on occasion, as had Rev. Solomon Nunes Carvalho. Leeser knew that in Hamburg, Rabbi Gotthold Salomon had broken new ground by delivering a sermon in German. Preaching in German soon became the norm in Reform synagogues, and even some conservative rabbis, such as Isaac Bernays, had begun to deliver sermons in the vernacular. Leeser helped to transform the lectern into the pulpit.

On June 2, 1830, Leeser became known for one of the earliest American sermons delivered in English. He clashed with the synagogue's lay leaders over pay and a lifetime contract. Thereafter he preached with regularity, though on sufferance only, until June 18, 1843, when the congregation formally accepted the sermon as regular. Leeser's practice of delivering sermons on a regular basis was ultimately adopted by American congregations, and preaching became one of the standard duties of Jewish clergymen.

=== Publisher ===
The scarcity of books concerning the Jewish religion had concerned many in his congregation. Leeser nearly singlehandedly provided American Jews with the texts they needed to worship. Although Philadelphia had vibrant publishing community, no one wanted to publish his translation of a Jewish instructional for children from German, so Leeser printed and published it himself in 1830. Similarly, he issued proposals to publish his translations of Johlson's Instruction in the Mosaic Religion, as well as his The Jews and the Mosaic Law, both of which likewise produced no offers, so he became his own publisher.

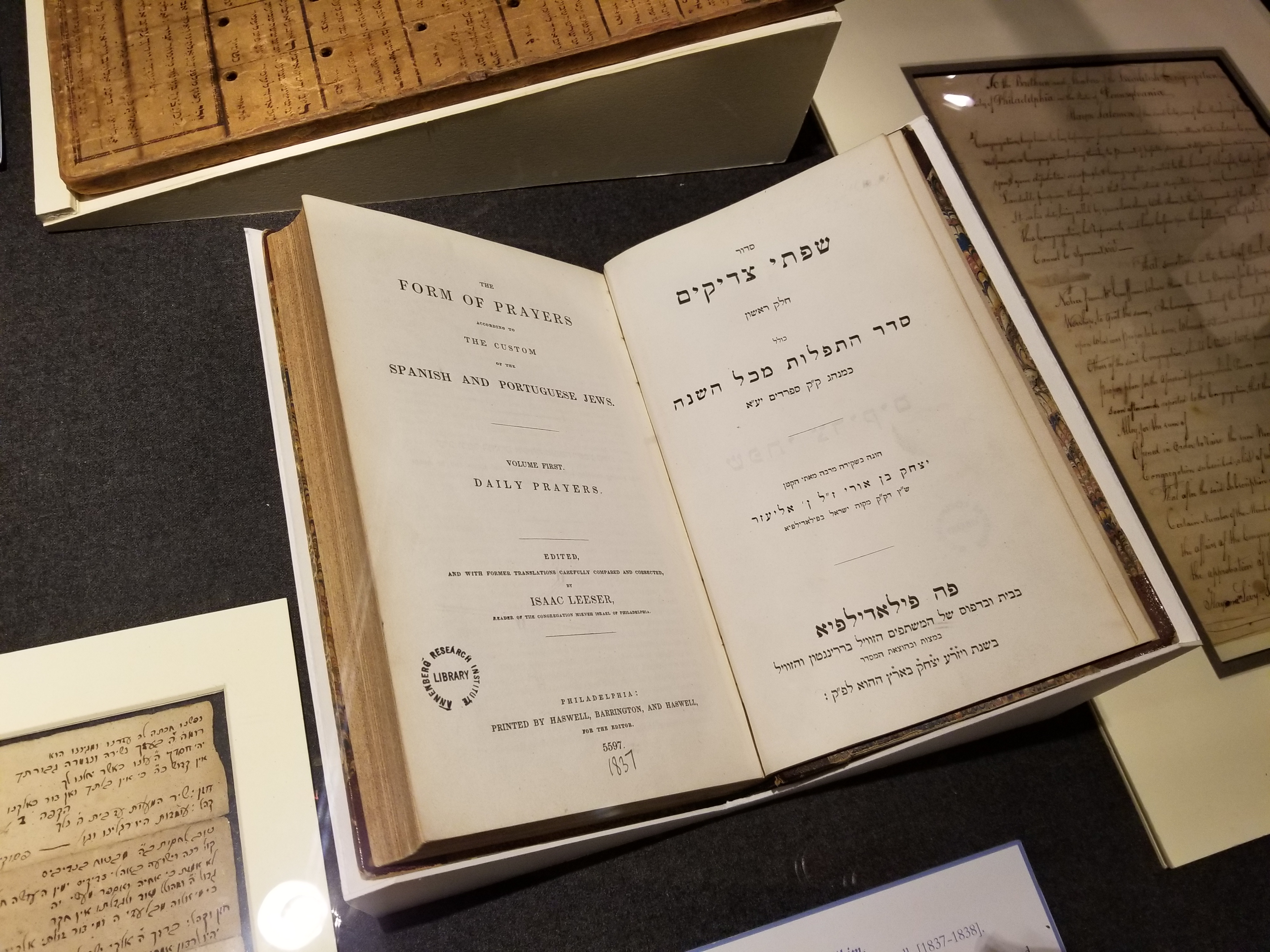

In 1837, he edited The Form of Prayers: The Custom of the Spanish and Portuguese Jews, representing a translation into English of the Sephardic prayers used at Philadelphia's Mikveh Israel synagogue.

In 1845, Leeser published his own Hebrew-English edition of the Torah in five volumes. It was the first such translation in the United States, and became the standard Bible for English-speaking Jews during the nineteenth century.

Three years later, Leeser published a Masoretic Hebrew edition of the Tanakh, Biblia Hebraica, in cooperation with Joseph Jaquett, a local Episcopalian minister. It was the first of its kind to be printed in America.

In 1853, Leeser completed his English translation of the entire Tanakh, commonly called The Leeser Bible. In 1857 he issued a second (folio-size) edition of this Bible. A compact size edition (containing a "Notes" section in the back of the book) was printed two years after the quarto edition (which contained footnotes of more extensive notes), as stated in the second to the last paragraph of the Preface of the compact size edition.

=== Community leader ===
Many Jews emigrated from Germany in the 1830s and 1840s, and Leeser founded a free Jewish school in his home, as well as traveled to address other synagogues. He helped found the Hebrew Education Society of Philadelphia in 1848, although he could not garner sufficient support to establish a network of Jewish schools to rival the local public schools. Following a disagreement, Leeser resigned from Congregation Mikveh Israel in 1850, which called the Italian conservative hazzan Sabato Morais as his successor, as Leeser finished his Hebrew Bible translation, as well as oversaw the opening of the first Philadelphia Hebrew school (with 22 students) on April 7, 1851. The first rabbi emigrated to the United States in 1840. Leeser never married, and many congregations of the time required a hazzan to have a wife. In 1857, the newly formed Congregation Beth-El-Emeth in Philadelphia called Leeser to lead them, and he served there until his death. When Leeser commenced his public career, the United States had approximately 12,000 to 15,000 scattered Jewish individuals and members of congregations in the United States; that community (and its children) grew to about 200,000 by his death. He helped to mold them into a community in part by his pulpit activities, and in part by his press.

Leeser continued to advocate for the rights of religious minorities within American democracy. In the 1840s and 1850s, Leeser used his Occident and American Jewish Advocate magazine to alert the Jewish community to rising threats to their religious freedom. He also allied with other religious minorities, notably Seventh Day Baptists, to advocate against Sunday blue laws that banned work and other activities on the "Christian Sabbath".

Leeser participated in nearly all the early Jewish philanthropic activities in the United States — examples include the first Jewish day schools, the first Jewish seminary, the first Jewish publication society. The Occident and American Jewish Advocate acquired an international reputation during his 25 years at its helm. The Jewish Publication Society he founded became the predecessor of today's Jewish Publication Society of America, and Leeser's translation of the Bible became an authorized version for English-speaking Jews around the world. Shortly before his death, Rev. Leeser helped found Maimonides College and became its provost. That paved the way for future Jewish seminaries in the United States, although it closed its doors in 1873 and Hebrew Union College would not be founded in Cincinnati until 1875.

== Death and legacy ==
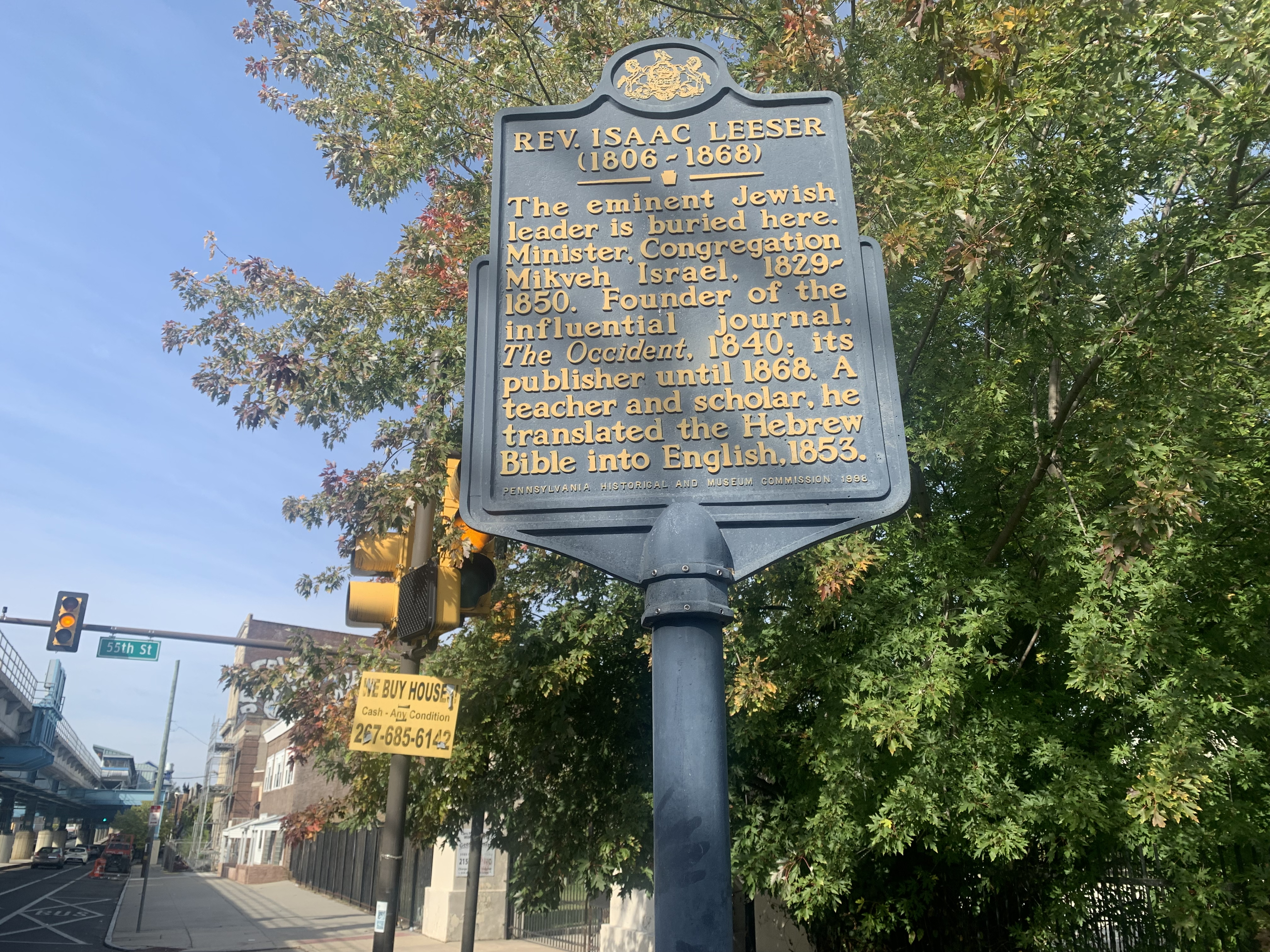
Rev. Isaac Leeser Pennsylvania Historic Market at 55th/Market Sts by Mikveh Israel Cemetery Beth-El-Emeth.

Leeser died in Philadelphia on February 1, 1868, aged 61 and shortly after publishing ten volumes of his sermons. He was buried in his congregation's cemetery in West Philadelphia, which later became a joint cemetery with his former congregation Mikveh Israel. In 1998, Philadelphia erected a historic marker near the cemetery's location, recognizing his contributions as a teacher and scholar.

By the terms of his will, Leeser left his extensive collection of letters, pamphlets, books, and periodicals to Maimonides College, which closed in 1873. Later, in 1913, the collection passed to Dropsie College, which itself closed in the early 1980s. The Leeser collection then passed to the Annenberg Research Institute, which became part of the University of Pennsylvania in 1993, as the Center for Advanced Judaic Studies. The University of Pennsylvania Libraries now holds the Leeser collection.

Leeser has been described as "a modern Orthodox Jew" because he hoped to create a "dynamic symbiosis of contemporary culture and Jewish tradition". He was also portrayed as "one [of] the most articulate spokesmen" among a small group of American Orthodox rabbis in the United States before the Civil War.

== Works ==
Leeser published the following works, including his own books, his translations, and books by other authors.

- Joseph Johlson's Instruction in the Mosaic Religion (translated by Leeser, 1830)
- The Jews and the Mosaic Law (1833)
- Discourses (2 volumes, 1837)
- Portuguese prayers, with Leeser's English translation (6 volumes, 1837)
- Hebrew Spelling-Book (1838)
- Catechism (1839)
- The Claims of the Jews to an Equality of Rights (1841)
- Discourses (1841)
- The Occident and American Jewish Advocate, a monthly magazine (1843—1868)
- The Pentateuch (Hebrew and English) (5 volumes, 1845)
- Daily Prayers, German Rite, with Leeser's English translation (1848)
- The Twenty-four books of the Holy Scriptures (The Leeser Bible) (4to, 1853)
- The Twenty-four books of the Holy Scriptures (The Leeser Bible) (Second edition, 18mo, 1857)
- Portuguese prayers, with Leeser's English translation (Second edition, 7 volumes, 1857)
- The Dias Letters (1859)
- The Inquisition and Judaism (1860)
- Meditations and Prayers (1864)
- Grace Aguilar, The Jewish Faith (1864)
- Grace Aguilar, Spirit of Judaism (1864)
- Collected Discourses (10 volumes, 1867)
- Joseph Johlson's Instruction in the Mosaic Religion (translated by Leeser, second edition, 1867)

In addition, Leeser translated Joseph Schwarz's Geography of Palestine and, with Jaquett, published an edition of the Hebrew Bible.

== See also ==
- History of Jewish education in the United States before the 20th century
- Jewish English Bible translations
- Jewish history in Philadelphia
- Relationship of American Jews to the U.S. Federal Government before the 20th century
