= Mayer Sulzberger =

American judge (1843–1923)

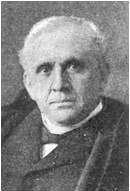
- Born: June 22, 1843; Heidelsheim, Bruchsal, Germany
- Died: April 20, 1923 (aged 79); Philadelphia, Pennsylvania, United States
- Occupation: Jurist

Mayer Sulzberger (June 22, 1843 – April 20, 1923) was an American judge and Jewish communal leader.

== Biography ==
Mayer Sulzberger was born at Heidelsheim, Bruchsal, Baden on June 22, 1843. He went to Philadelphia with his parents in 1848, and was educated at the Central High School of Philadelphia, and after graduating he studied law in the office of Moses A. Dropsie. In 1864 he was admitted to the bar, and attained eminence in the practice of his profession. He was elected judge of the Court of Common Pleas on the Republican ticket in 1895, and was reelected as a nominee of both parties in 1904, becoming the presiding judge of the Court of Common Pleas No. 2.

Sulzberger throughout his career showed great interest in Jewish affairs. While studying for the bar he taught at the Hebrew Education Society's school. For a time he was interested in the affairs of Maimonides College and was secretary of its board. He was closely associated with Isaac Leeser, and assisted that scholar in editing The Occident, contributing to it a partial translation of Maimonides' "Moreh Nebukim." After Leeser's death Sulzberger edited vol. xxvi. of The Occident. He was one of the founders of the Young Men's Hebrew Association, which he served as president; and he has taken great interest in the Jewish Hospital of Philadelphia, of which he has been vice-president since 1880. He was from the beginning (in 1888) chairman of the publication committee of the Jewish Publication Society of America; was one of the original trustees of the Baron de Hirsch fund; and interested himself in the establishment of agricultural colonies at Woodbine, N. J., and in Connecticut.

Sulzberger had one of the best private libraries in America; it contained a very large number of Hebraica and Judaica, together with many other early Hebrew printed books (including no less than forty-five Incunabula), and many manuscripts, and these he presented to the Jewish Theological Seminary of America in 1904, at whose reorganization he assisted and of which he was a life director. Sulzberger was a finished orator, and was chosen as the orator of the Jewish community upon several notable occasions. The honorary degree of doctor of laws was conferred upon him by the Jefferson Medical College, of which later became trustee.

Other organizations he was connected to include: American Jewish Committee (of which he was the first president, from 1906 to 1912), American Jewish Historical Society, Philadelphia Bar Association, Baron de Hirsch Fund, Board of Judges of Phila., Dropsie College for Hebrew and Cognate Learning, Federation of Jewish Charities of Phila., Gratz College, Hebrew Education Society of Phila., Independent Order of Brith Sholom of Phila., Congregation Mikveh Israel of Philadelphia, Oriental Club of Philadelphia, Phila. Board of City Trusts, Congregation Rodeph Shalom of Philadelphia, and the American Philosophical Society (of which he was an elected member).

Judge Sulzberger died at his home in Philadelphia on April 20, 1923, and is interred in the Mikveh Israel Cemetery (11th and Federal) in South Philadelphia.
