= Israel H. Levinthal =

Lithuanian-born American rabbi (1888–1982)

Israel Herbert Levinthal (February 12, 1888 – October 31, 1982) was a Lithuanian-born American rabbi from Brooklyn.

== Life ==
Levinthal was born on February 12, 1888, in Vilna, Russia, the son of Rabbi Bernard L. Levinthal and Minna Kleinberg. He immigrated to America in 1891. His brother was Philadelphia lawyer and judge Louis E. Levinthal.

Levinthal attended Columbia University, graduating from there with a B.A. in 1908 and a M.A. in 1910. While there, he received the Curtis Medal for oratorical excellence in 1908. He then went to the Jewish Theological Seminary of America, where he was ordained a rabbi in 1910 and received a L.H.D. in 1920. He also went to New York University and received a J.D. there in 1914. Following his ordination, he served as rabbi of Temple B'nai Shalom in Brooklyn, New York, from 1910 to 1915, Temple Petach Tikvah from 1915 to 1919, and the Brooklyn Jewish Center starting in 1919.

Levinthal's time at Temple B'nai Shalom discouraged him from the rabbinate due to the constant pressure to raise funds. This led him to study law at New York University, but he never practiced law and he decided to remain a rabbi. He introduced a number of innovations at Temple Petach Tikvah, including late Friday night services, youth clubs, a daily Hebrew school, and congregation-affiliated organizations. He sought to establish a synagogue-center that would be responsive to American urban life like an institutional church. His reforms, as well as his Zionist and communal activities outside the Temple, provoked opposition from the congregation. This led him to leave the Temple in 1919 and join the newly-formed Brooklyn Jewish Center. He was later elected by the congregation as rabbi for life, and in 1974 the main sanctuary was named the Israel H. Levinthal Synagogue.

Levinthal was considered a distinguished pulpit orator from the start of his rabbinic career and was especially adept in Midrashic interpretation. He was a founder of the Brooklyn Jewish Center, and under his leadership it became the largest and most influential Jewish center in Brooklyn, developing a model daily Hebrew school, a progressive school that combined secular and Hebrew education, an institute for adult studies, and weekly public forums. He also became a leader in Hebrew letters, Jewish unity, and Zionism. He visited Mandatory Palestine on numerous occasions as both a Zionist and a representative of American organizations, including at the laying of the cornerstone of Hebrew University and the dedication of the Jerusalem Synagogue Center.

Levinthal was president of the Rabbinical Assembly from 1930 to 1932, chair of the United Synagogue's campaign to build the Jerusalem Synagogue Center from 1932 to 1935, a founder and first president of the Brooklyn Board of Rabbis from 1929 to 1931, chair of the Brooklyn Region of the Zionist Organization of America from 1933 to 1935, and president of the Brooklyn Jewish Community Council from 1940 to 1944. He taught homiletics at the Jewish Theological Seminary in 1937, and from 1947 to 1962 he taught there as a visiting professor. Jews were leaving Brooklyn for the suburbs in the 1960s, and by 1973 he had to curtail the Center's activities, close the Hebrew school, and cancel Friday night services. Although he never officially retired from the Center, he spent the last few years of his life quietly living with his daughter in New Rochelle.

In 1908, Levinthal married May R. Bogdanoff over strong objections from both their parents. They had two children, Helen and Lazar. Helen graduated from the Jewish Institute of Religion in 1939, making her the first American woman to complete the entire course of study in a rabbinical school, and preached and taught in synagogues.

Levinthal died in the New Rochelle Hospital on October 31, 1982. He was buried at Montefiore Cemetery in Springfield Gardens, Queens.
