= Relationship of American Jews to the U.S. Federal Government before the 20th century =

The Damascus Affair of 1840 marks the real beginning of the diplomatic or international phase in the history of American Jews (though a reference to the services which Mordecai M. Noah rendered his country as consul at Tunis (1813–16) should not be omitted). The persecutions and tortures to which some of the most prominent Jews of Damascus had been subjected were reported to the Department of State at Washington, D.C. by the United States consul at Damascus. Immediate instructions, under date of 14 August 1840, were thereupon issued to John Gliddon, the United States consul at Alexandria, Egypt, by Secretary of State John Forsyth, in which he directed that all good offices and efforts be employed to display the active sympathy of the United States in the attempts that the governments of Europe were making to mitigate the horrors of these persecutions. Three days later David Porter, the United States minister to the Ottoman Empire, was instructed by Forsyth to do everything in his power at the Porte to alleviate the condition of the unfortunates. In both these communications the reasons for the intervention of the United States are based upon sentiments of justice and humanity, no American citizens being involved; in the communication to Minister Porter stress was laid upon the peculiar propriety and right of the intervention of the United States, because its political and civil institutions make no distinction in favor of individuals by reason of race or creed, but treat all with absolute equality.

== Damascus Affair ==
Though it would appear that this action of the United States was taken without the solicitation of any Jews of the US, measures were already on foot to display the feeling of the Jews at this time. Public meetings were held in August and September 1840, in New York City, Philadelphia, and Richmond, participated in by both Christians and Jews, at which resolutions were passed asking the United States to intervene to procure justice for the accused and the mitigation of their hardships. Among the leaders who were instrumental in calling these meetings were Jacob Ezekiel of Richmond, J. B. Kurscheedt and Theodore J. Seixas of New York, and Isaac Leeser and John Moss of Philadelphia. Considerable correspondence passed between these leaders and the Department of State, in which the humanitarian attitude of the government and the nature of its intervention are fully disclosed.

Ten years later the Jews of the US were concerned in the diplomatic relations with Switzerland. Almost simultaneously the negotiations assumed two phases: (a) respecting the ratification of a treaty in which lurked the possibility that American citizens who were not Christians might be discriminated against, and (b) concerning the actual discrimination in Switzerland against American citizens, on the ground that they belonged to the Jewish faith.

== Swiss disabilities ==
In November 1850, A. Dudley Mann, the American representative, negotiated a treaty with the Swiss Confederation, which was transmitted to the United States Senate on 13 February 1851, by President Millard Fillmore. At the same time the president sent a message in which he took exception to a part of the first article of the treaty, which specifically provided that Christians alone were to be entitled to the privileges guaranteed. An agitation against the ratification of the treaty was started by the Jews as soon as its existence was learned of, and Daniel Webster, then secretary of state, and Senator Henry Clay at once (February 1851) went on record as opposed to the objectionable clause of the treaty. The principal agents in stirring up the opposition were Isaac Leeser, David Einhorn, J. M. Cardozo of Charleston, South Carolina, and Capt. Jonas Phillips Levy of New York. A movement was set on foot in the US shortly thereafter (1852–53) to procure religious toleration abroad for American citizens generally; this was quite distinct from any movement started by the Jews, but greatly aided the latter. As a result of this combined opposition the Senate declined to ratify the treaty. Senator Lewis Cass of Michigan figured largely in the opposition to it. He corresponded with Rev. Isaac Leeser and Captain Levy respecting it, delivered several notable speeches in the Senate against it in 1854, and presented a petition on April 19, 1854, which had been signed by Jews of the United States at the instance of a committee of New York Jews, of which Alexander J. Kursheedt was chairman. As a result, the treaty was amended by the Senate, and in its amended form was ratified and proclaimed 9 November 1855. But the amendment, though less objectionable in phraseology, retained the same connotation and rendered it possible, under its terms, for the Swiss cantons to discriminate against Jews in the manner they had adopted in 1851. Though unsuccessful in preventing the ratification of the treaty, the agitation against it did not cease. Notwithstanding the treaty was proclaimed at the end of 1855, it would appear that this was not generally known until 1857. Attention was drawn to it by the fact that one A. H. Gootman, an American citizen and a Jew, had received notice in 1856 to leave La Chaux-de-Fonds, in Neuchâtel, where he had transacted business for five years. Public meetings of protest were held during 1857, in Pittsburgh, Indianapolis, Easton, Pa., Charleston, Baltimore, and elsewhere, and a vigorous opposition was voiced by Isaac M. Wise in his paper, "The Israelite", by David Einhorn in "Sinai", and by Isaac Leeser in "The Occident". A convention of Jews met in Baltimore in October, and a delegation appointed by this convention waited on President James Buchanan in the same month to protest against the treaty and request its abrogation; the president promised to take steps to accede to their request so far as lay in his power. Numerous memorials were also transmitted to the president and the Senate. That this agitation attracted general attention is manifested by the fact that the newspapers throughout the country expressed vigorous opinions against the treaty.

Though sporadic efforts to procure an alteration in the treaty and the establishment of the rights not only of American Jews but of the Jews of all nations in Switzerland continued to be made in the United States, the principal scene of negotiations shifted to the former country, and the principal actor was Theodore Fay, the American minister. Beginning in August 1853, when an American citizen, the same Gootman referred to above, received orders from the authorities of La Chaux-de-Fonds, canton of Neuchâtel, to leave that canton on the ground that he was a Jew, Fay, though at first disinclined to take any very energetic stand, finally became much interested in the subject of Swiss discrimination against Jews and kept up an active agitation until his recall in 1860. He succeeded in procuring permission for Gootman to remain, but only as an act of grace, not by right. The obstacle Fay had to attempt to overcome lay in the nature of the Swiss Confederation, which left to the cantons the regulation of the rights of domicil, the Federal Council having no control over the cantons in this respect. Fay was ably supported in his contentions by the secretaries of state Marcy and Lewis Cass, especially the latter. In the course of his negotiations Fay made an elaborate study of the Jewish question as it affected Switzerland, and in June 1859, transmitted what he called his "Israelite Note" to the Federal Council. This is an extensive treatise explaining the American contention with much force, and embodying besides a general defense of the Jews. It was translated into German and French, was offered for sale by the Federal Council, received much notice in the Swiss newspapers, and caused the restrictions against Jews to be abolished in several cantons. In 1860 the executive committee of the Board of Delegates of American Israelites, of which Myer S. Isaacs was secretary, took steps to continue the agitation in America. Henry I. Hart, the president of the above-mentioned board, took up the matter with Secretary Seward shortly after he assumed office in 1861, and the secretary issued specific instructions to the new minister to Switzerland, George G. Fogg, to be no less active in his endeavor to establish the rights of American Jews than was his predecessor. The restrictions in the cantons were gradually abolished, and full civil rights were finally guaranteed to all Jews by the new Swiss Constitution of 1874. It may be added, however, that the treaty of 1855 is still in force (1905; "Publ. Am. Jew. Hist. Soc." No. 11, pp. 7 et seq.).

== Serbia and Palestine ==
In 1867 Myer S. Isaacs, on behalf of the Board of Delegates of American Israelites, endeavored unsuccessfully to have the government take some steps to alleviate the condition of the Jews in Serbia. In 1882 Gen. Lew Wallace, United States minister to the Ottoman Empire, moved by the hardships suffered by Russian refugees whom he found starving in the streets of Constantinople, called at the Foreign Office and received a communication from the minister of foreign affairs in which the statement was made that Jews would be made welcome anywhere in the Ottoman Empire, except in Ottoman Palestine. In 1884 he took vigorous action against the threatened expulsion from Jerusalem of sundry naturalized American Jews. In 1887 and 1888 attempts were made by the Ottoman government to limit the sojourn of American Jews in Jerusalem to one month—later extended to three months. This was earnestly opposed by the American minister, Oscar S. Straus, ably supported by Secretary Bayard, who contended that the United States, by reason of its Constitution, could not recognize any distinction between American citizens in respect to their religion. By his exertions Straus successfully halted any steps to expel American citizens who happened to be Jews ("U.S. For. Rel." 1887, 1888, 1889). Secretaries Blaine, Gresham, and Hay repeatedly took a similar stand, and it would appear that rights of American citizens who are Jews have been carefully guarded in the Ottoman Empire ("U.S. For. Rel." 1894, 1898, 1901).

== Morocco ==
In 1863 atrocities perpetrated upon the Jews of Morocco led the Board of Delegates to ask the intervention of the United States. Secretary Seward instructed the United States consul at Tangier to use his good offices to further the mission of Sir Moses Montefiore, basing his act on the ground of common humanity. For two years the consul exerted himself to carry out his instructions and met with some slight success. In 1878 the Board of Delegates renewed its endeavors to have the government use its good offices in Morocco, and the consul at Tangier, F. A. Matthews, took earnest steps to alleviate the condition of the Jews whenever the opportunity arose during this and succeeding years. Adolph Sanger, on behalf of the Board of Delegates, in 1880 sent out an agent, L. A. Cohen, to Morocco to report on conditions there. In March 1881, the United States minister at Madrid, Lucius Fairchild, proceeded to Morocco to investigate the condition of the Jews. He made a sympathetic and valuable report to the secretary of state, Blaine, in which he displayed an acute interest in the unfortunate conditions in that country, and did his utmost to alleviate them.

== Romanian disabilities ==
Romanian conditions, which have so vitally interested the United States, first had attention drawn to them by the Board of Delegates in June 1867, when the good offices of the United States in behalf of the persecuted Jews of Romania were requested. In 1870 B. F. Peixotto of New York was appointed consul-general to Romania, and during the six years that he held office he exerted himself to bring about an improvement in the condition of the Jews. In 1878 John A. Kasson, minister of the United States to Austria, in a despatch to the Department of State proposed as a condition preliminary to the recognition of Romanian independence that the United States join with the European powers in exacting from Romania, at the Congress of Berlin, the recognition of the equal civil, commercial, and religious rights of all classes of her population, as also equal rights and protection under the treaty and under Romanian laws, irrespective of race or religious belief. In opening negotiations with Romania in the following year, the recognition by that country of the rights of sojourn and trade of all classes of Americans irrespective of race or creed was strongly emphasized, as it was by Kasson about the same time with respect to Serbia. The continued persecutions of the Jews of Romania, her violations of the provisions of the Treaty of Berlin, and the greatly increased proportions which the Romanian emigration to the United States assumed in consequence, as also the failure to conclude a naturalization convention between the two countries, because Romania would not recognize the rights of American citizens who were Jews, moved Secretary of State John Hay to address on 11 August 1902, identical instructions to the representatives of the United States in Russia, France, Germany, Britain, Italy, and Turkey upon the subject of Romania's attitude. In this note he drew attention to the consequences to the United States of the continued persecutions in Romania—namely, the unnatural increase of immigration from that country—and upon this based his right to remonstrate to the signatories to the Treaty of Berlin against the acts of the Romanian government. Further, he sustained the right of the United States to ask the above-mentioned powers to intervene upon the strongest grounds of humanity. Acting upon the forcible instructions, the representatives of the United States presented this note to the government to which each was accredited. But beyond the abolition of the Oath More Judaico (1904) and some slight diminution of the harshness of the persecution, little has been accomplished, and Romania continues (1905) almost unrestrictedly to violate the treaty which established her as an independent nation. In 1905 Congress made provision for an American legation at Bucharest.

== Russian passports ==
The diplomatic correspondence between Russia and the United States involving Jews is of considerable bulk. It relates for the most part to the failure of Russia to recognize the validity of American passports where Jews are involved, which is the principal cause of difference between the United States and Russia. Russia has constantly violated the provisions of her treaty of 1832 with the United States, which gives to the citizens of the two countries unrestricted rights of sojourn, travel, and protection. Until the persecutions in Russia assumed acute form, beginning with 1880, the correspondence between the two countries was not of importance, though occasional earlier instances of discrimination by Russia against American citizens who were Jews had been vigorously protested against by the United States authorities. For the past twenty-five years the record is one of unceasing effort on the part of the United States to establish the rights of American citizens who are Jews, and of continued declination of Russia to live up to her treaty stipulations. The threatened expulsion from St. Petersburg of an American citizen named Pinkos, in 1880, was the occasion for the presentation of energetic notes of remonstrance by John W. Foster, the American minister to Russia. He acted not alone of his own responsibility, but was the recipient of specific instructions from the secretary of state, William M. Evarts. In the course of one of Evarts' letters of instruction the attitude assumed by the United States was clearly set forth in the following terms: "In the view of this government the religion professed by one of its citizens has no relation to that citizen's right to the protection of the United States" ("Am. Jewish Year Book," 1904-5, p. 287). The first protests of Foster and Evarts, inasmuch as they brought forth no satisfactory replies, were succeeded by others of the same tenor, in one of which Evarts stated "that we ask treaty treatment for our aggrieved citizens, not because they are Jews, but because they are Americans" (ib. p. 290). All the answers of the Russian Foreign Office are based on the claim that the proscriptive laws against the Jews were in existence prior to the treaty of 1832, that they, therefore, must be assumed under the treaty, and, furthermore, that the Jewish question in Russia was complicated by economic and other difficulties. These views were answered in the able despatch of James Blaine, secretary of state, of July 29, 1881. This despatch covers in considerable detail the whole of the American contention, and is so forcibly put that subsequent consideration of the same subject by the Department of State has been unable to add much to it ("For. Rel. U.S." 1881, p. 1030). As continued remonstrances during subsequent years led to no results, in 1893 the Department of State took the stand that it could not acquiesce in the action of Russian consuls in asking the religion of American citizens desiring to travel in Russia before granting a visé to their passports, and refusing Jews. The government regarded this as the "assumption of a religious inquisitorial function within our own borders, by a foreign agency, in a manner... repugnant to the national sense." In 1895 this view was forcibly presented to the Russian government by the American minister, Clifton R. Breckenridge, and in July of that year the Department of State took the attitude that a "continuance in such a course, after our views have been clearly but considerately made known, may trench upon the just limits of consideration" (ib. pp. 295, 297). But in spite of the presentation of the American contention in every possible light and with all possible emphasis, Russia stubbornly refuses to live up to her treaty obligations.

In April 1902, at the instance of Henry M. Goldfogle, a member of Congress from New York, the House of Representatives passed a resolution calling upon the secretary of state to inform the House "whether American citizens of the Jewish religious faith holding passports issued by this government are barred or excluded from entering the territory of the Empire of Russia," and what action concerning the matter had been taken by the government. A few days later Secretary Hay replied, stating in brief what efforts had been made by the United States for the protection of American citizens in Russia, and added that though "begun many years ago... [they] have not been attended with encouraging success" (ib. pp. 301, 302).

In January 1904, Goldfogle introduced another resolution, requesting the president to resume negotiations with Russia looking to the recognition of the validity of American passports irrespective of the religion of the holder. This resolution gave rise to notable addresses on the part of a number of members of the House, and was passed, in substance, in April of that year (ib. pp. 304, 305). In consequence of this resolution the question of American passports was taken up anew by the Department of State during the summer of 1904. The Russian reply made at that time was to the effect that a commission had been created in 1903 to consider the revision of the passport regulations, and that the desires of the United States would be brought to the attention of that commission. In his annual message, December 1904, President Roosevelt wrote vigorously against the Russian attitude, characterizing it as "unjust and irritating toward us." In February 1905, a committee of members of the House of Representatives was formed, with Wachter of Maryland as chairman, to urge further action by the Department of State. As yet nothing significant has been accomplished.

=== Kishinef petition ===
The massacres at Kishinef in April 1903, aroused indignation throughout the United States. Though in response to a cable of inquiry sent by Secretary John Hay to Ambassador Robert S. McCormick at St. Petersburg, asking if relief could be sent to the sufferers, the ambassador stated that he was informed officially that there was no distress or want in south-western Russia, nevertheless mass-meetings were held in almost every city of importance, and the comments in the newspapers portrayed the feelings of horror of the American people. A practical turn was given by the collection of considerable sums to alleviate the misery of the unfortunates. In the hope that if the attention of the czar were directly brought to the plight of the Jews in his dominions their condition might be alleviated, the Independent Order of B'nai B'rith took measures to prepare a petition for transmittal to him. On June 15, 1903, a committee of the order waited upon Secretary Hay and President Theodore Roosevelt, and presented a tentative draft of the petition. This having met with their approval, it was then circulated throughout the United States, and over 12,500 signatures of Christians and Jews in all walks of life were appended to it. On July 15 the American representative at St. Petersburg was instructed to ask an audience of the minister of foreign affairs in order to find out whether the petition, which was given in full in the despatch, would be received by the minister to be put before the czar. The minister declined to receive it, and the bound copy with the signatures was placed by Secretary Hay in the archives of the Department of State in October 1903. Though the petition did not reach its destination, its words attained worldwide publicity, and its object was in a measure accomplished in this way (Adler, "Voice of America on Kishineff," 1904).

Throughout the history of the United States the government has insisted with great force upon the equal treatment of all American citizens in foreign countries, irrespective of race or creed. Further, it never has failed to intercede with foreign governments on humanitarian grounds, whenever the opportunity arose, in behalf of Jews who were being persecuted or of those to whom life was rendered precarious by inhuman proscriptive laws. A considerable number of Jews have held diplomatic posts, among the more prominent being Mordecai M. Noah, consul to Tunis, 1813–16; Edwin de Leon, consul-general to Egypt, 1854; August Belmont, secretary of legation at The Hague, 1853–55, and minister resident, 1855–58; Oscar S. Straus, minister to Turkey, 1887–89, 1897–1900; Solomon Hirsch, minister to Turkey, 1889–92; B. F. Peixotto, consul to Bucharest, 1870–76; Simon Wolf, consul-general to Egypt, 1881; Max Judd, consul-general to Vienna, 1893–97; and Lewis Einstein, third secretary of embassy at Paris, 1903, and London, 1905.

== See also ==
- Jewish American
- Jewish history in the United States (pre-20th century)
- List of Jewish Americans
- Military history of Jewish Americans
- History of the Jews in Colonial America
