= Maimonides College =

Defunct Jewish institute of higher education in Philadelphia (1867–1873)

- Type: Jewish seminary
- Active: October 28, 1867–December 1873
- Founder: Isaac Leeser
- Affiliations: Hebrew Education Society of Philadelphia; Board of Delegates of American Israelites
- Religious affiliation: Judaism
- Location: Philadelphia, Pennsylvania, United States

Maimonides College was a Jewish institute of higher education which existed in Philadelphia from 1867 to 1873. It was named for the great mediaeval Jewish philosopher and Torah sage, Maimonides. Although short-lived, it was the first Jewish theological seminary in the United States.

On Dec. 4, 1864, a meeting was held which resulted in the establishment of the first Jewish theological seminary in America. The need of such an institution was strongly felt, as there were numerous synagogues in the country, but few persons capable of filling the rabbinical office. The seminary was established under the joint auspices of the Hebrew Education Society of Philadelphia and the Board of Delegates of American Israelites; it was opened Oct. 28, 1867, with Isaac Leeser as its provost. Sabato Morais, Marcus Jastrow, Aaron S. Bettelheim, L. Buttenwieser, William H. Williams; and the provost comprised the faculty. At a later date Hyman Polano and George Jacobs were added to this number.

Abraham Hart was president, and Mayer Sulzberger secretary, of the board of trustees. Lawyer and philanthropist Moses A. Dropsie was the first president of the college, followed by Isidore Binswanger.

After an activity extending through six years Maimonides College was closed in December 1873 due to financial difficulties; its closure was a major motivator for the founding of the Union of American Hebrew Congregations.
