= Historic Congregation B'nai Abraham =

Synagogue in Philadelphia (built 1909)

Historic Congregation B’nai Abraham
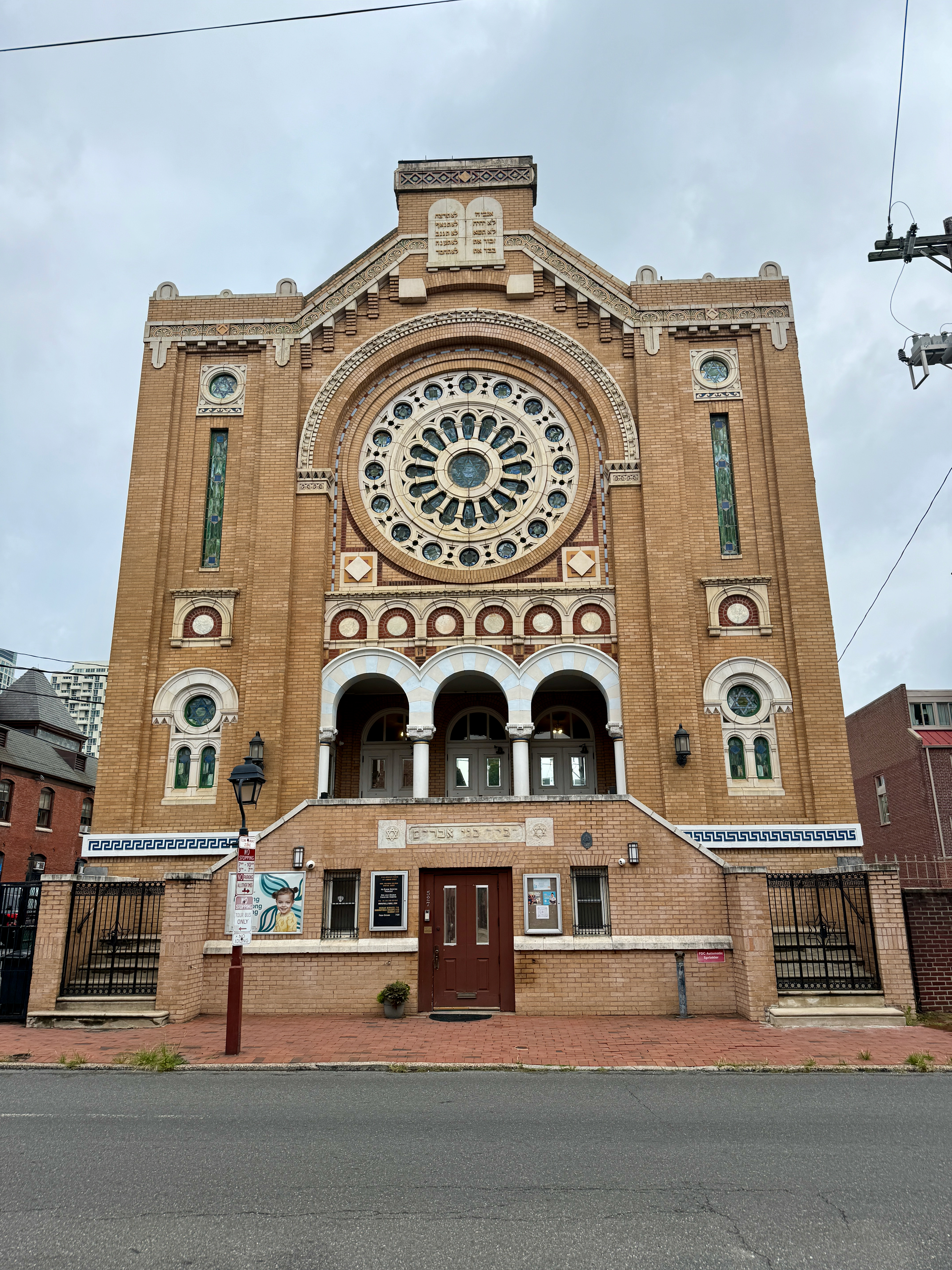

- Location in Philadelphia

Religion
- Affiliation: Orthodox Judaism
- Rite: Nusach Ashkenaz
- Ecclesiastical or organisational status: Synagogue
- Leadership: Rabbi Yochonon Goldman; Rebbetzin Leah Goldman
- Status: Active

Location
- Location: 523-527 Lombard Street, Society Hill, Philadelphia, Pennsylvania 19147
- Country: United States
- Coordinates: 39°56′36″N 75°09′05″W

Architecture
- Architects: Charles W. Bolton & Sons
- Type: Synagogue
- Style: Byzantine Revival
- General contractor: Saml. Lashner & Co.
- Established: 1874 (as a congregation)
- Groundbreaking: 1909
- Completed: 1910
- Construction cost: $28,000

Specifications
- Direction of façade: South
- Capacity: 1,000

Website
- www.phillyshul.com

Historic Congregation B’nai Abraham, officially B’nai Abraham Chabad, is an Orthodox Jewish congregation and synagogue, located at 523-527 Lombard Street, in the Society Hill neighborhood of the Center City of Philadelphia, Pennsylvania, in the United States. Established as a congregation in 1874 and the current synagogue building completed in 1910, worshipers can access daily, Shabbat, and holy day services in the Ashkenazi rite. B'nai Abraham is home to a Jewish Preschool, as well as Lubavitch of Center City.

== Russian Shul, 1874-1891 ==
B'nai Abraham was established in 1874 as the "Russian shul". An 1881 almanac identifies the name as Beth Hamedrosh Hagadol B'nai Abraham Anshe Russe. Its congregants officially incorporated in 1882 as Chevra B’nai Avrohom Mi Russe (Hebrew: חברה בני אברהם מרוסיה, lit. 'Organization Sons of Abraham from Russia'). The synagogue would continue to be known as B'nai Abraham Anshe Russa; Congregation B’nai Abraham; the B’nai Abraham Congregation; and later as Historic Congregation B’nai Abraham.

Rabbi Israel M. Sacks served as first official rabbi of the congregation as early as 1881.

B'nai Abraham grew in the 1880s with increased immigration of Jews from Russia and Eastern Europe and their settlement in Philadelphia in the city's Jewish quarter. In 1885, B'nai Abraham purchased a building at 521 Lombard Street built in 1820 by the Wesley Church, an AME Zion congregation, who had broken away from Mother Bethel A.M.E. Church, 419 S 6th Street. By 1885, Wesley Church's congregation had outgrown the building. B'nai Abraham purchased the land and building for $6,500 and held services for the first time in the building on September 30, 1885.

The 1885 dedication of the synagogue building was attended by Marcus Jastrow, rabbi of the city's German congregation, and Sabato Morais, rabbi of the Spanish and Portuguese congregation.

In response to harassment and attacks in the neighborhood, 300 people, most recent Russian-speaking immigrants, gathered at the synagogue in August 1891 to form a mutual protection organization. The initiative proved contentious in the community as leaders advocated for working with local authorities and law enforcement, and feared fostering further animosity in the neighborhood.

== Rabbi Bernard Leventhal, 1891-1953 ==
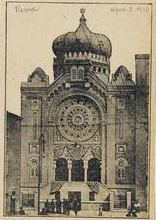
April 1910, The Philadelphia Record.

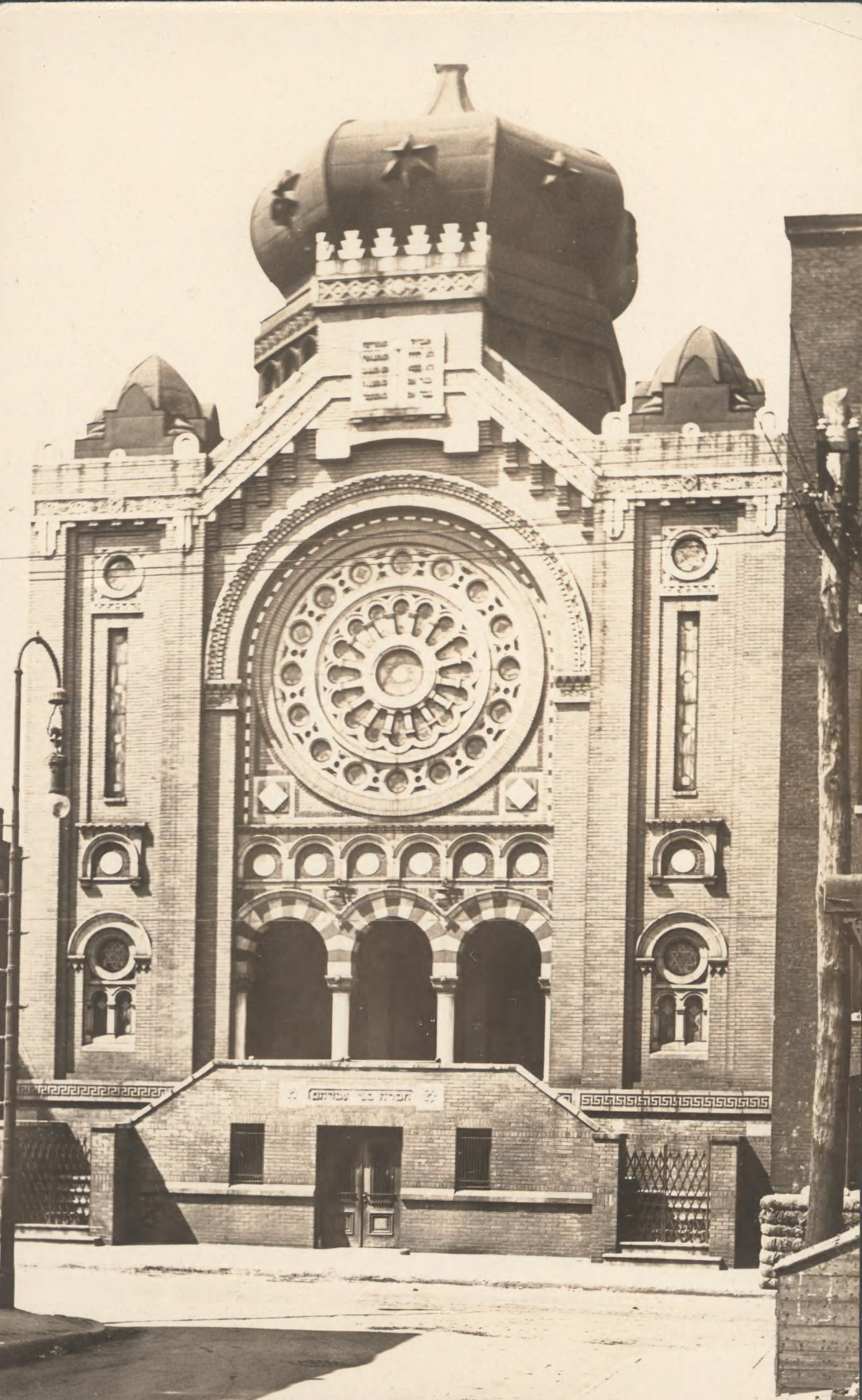
B'nai Abraham Synagogue in 1923 photographed by George Mark

Rabbi Eliazar Kleinberg, Chief Rabbi of Vilna, assumed the pulpit of the congregation in 1889 and served for two years before his passing in February 1891. In September 1891, Rabbi Kleinberg was succeeded by his son-in-law, R. Bernard L. Levinthal. Rabbi Levinthal would serve as the congregation rabbi until his passing on September 23, 1952.

B'nai Abraham had 225 members and 150 seat holders in 1900.

In 1909, B'nai Abraham retained the services of contractor Samuel Lashner & Co. to construct a new building at a cost of $28,000. It was designed by architect Charles W. Bolton & Co. in the style of Byzantine Revival. Bolton and his firm had designed B'nai Reuben, built on South Sixth Street in 1905. They took as inspiration for B'nai Abraham's new building the Pike Street Synagogue (Congregation Sons of Israel Kalwarie) built in 1903 and 1904 at 13-15 Pike Street in Manhattan, and designed by the architect Alfred E. Badt.

Demolition of the old building began on May 10, 1909. The corner-stones of the new building were laid on July 18, 1909 with a public ceremony attended Dr Solis Cohen, Rabbi AF Ershler, Rabbi Joseph Grossman, Rabbi Nathan Brenner, Rabbi RA Rabinowitz. Rabbi Levinthal delivered the keynote address in Yiddish. At the time, it was estimated that the building would cost $35,000. The new building was dedicated April 1910.

The building was struck by lightning in July 1926, igniting a fire that caused $75,000 in damages to the property. The synagogue then housed twenty three Torah scrolls all of which were rescued.

== B'nai Abraham, 1954-present ==
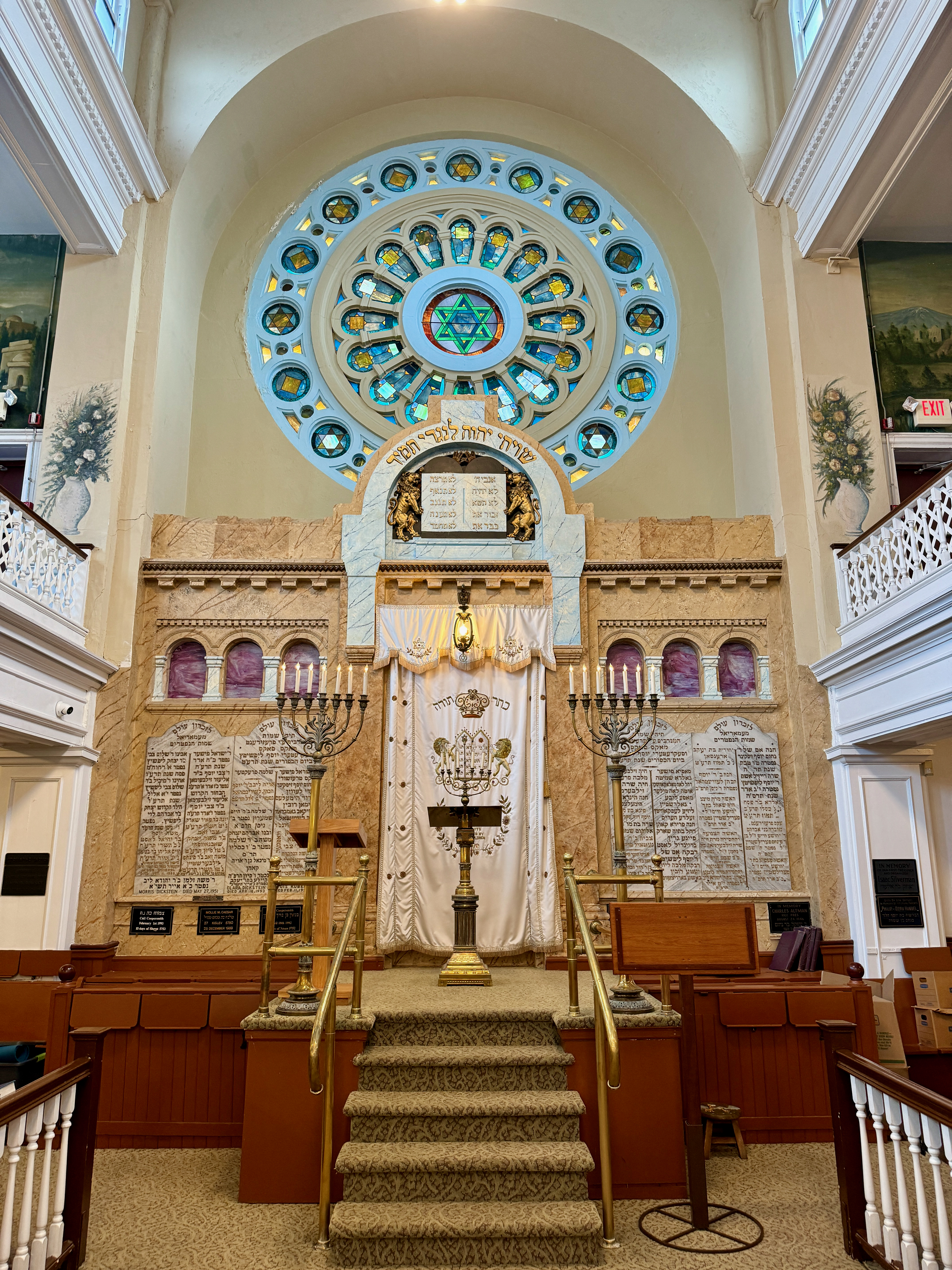
Interior in 2024

Rabbi H. Zvi Gottesman succeeded R. Levinthal on a part-time basis in 1954.

Society Hill's Jewish population contracted in the 1960s and 1970s, and B'nai Abraham identified as a Conservative congregation by 1974.

Rabbi Ezekiel Musleah (1927-2020), from Kolkata served as rabbi from 1979 until 1982.

In late March 1998, the synagogue was defaced with a swastika and a pig's head left by the building. The congregation responded by opening its doors to the community for a "unity concert" and pre-Passover activities.

Rabbi Yochonon Goldman became the congregation's rabbi in 2000 and continues to serve in this capacity in 2019.

The congregation had 75 members in 2011.

Congregation B'nai Abraham at 523-527 Lombard is now the oldest Philadelphia synagogue built as a synagogue and still in continuous use as such.

The Philadelphia Historical Commission added Congregation B'nai Abraham to the Philadelphia Register of Historic Places on Dec. 31, 1984.

== See also ==
- History of the Jews in Pennsylvania
