= Bernard L. Levinthal =

American rabbi

Rabbi Bernard L. Levinthal
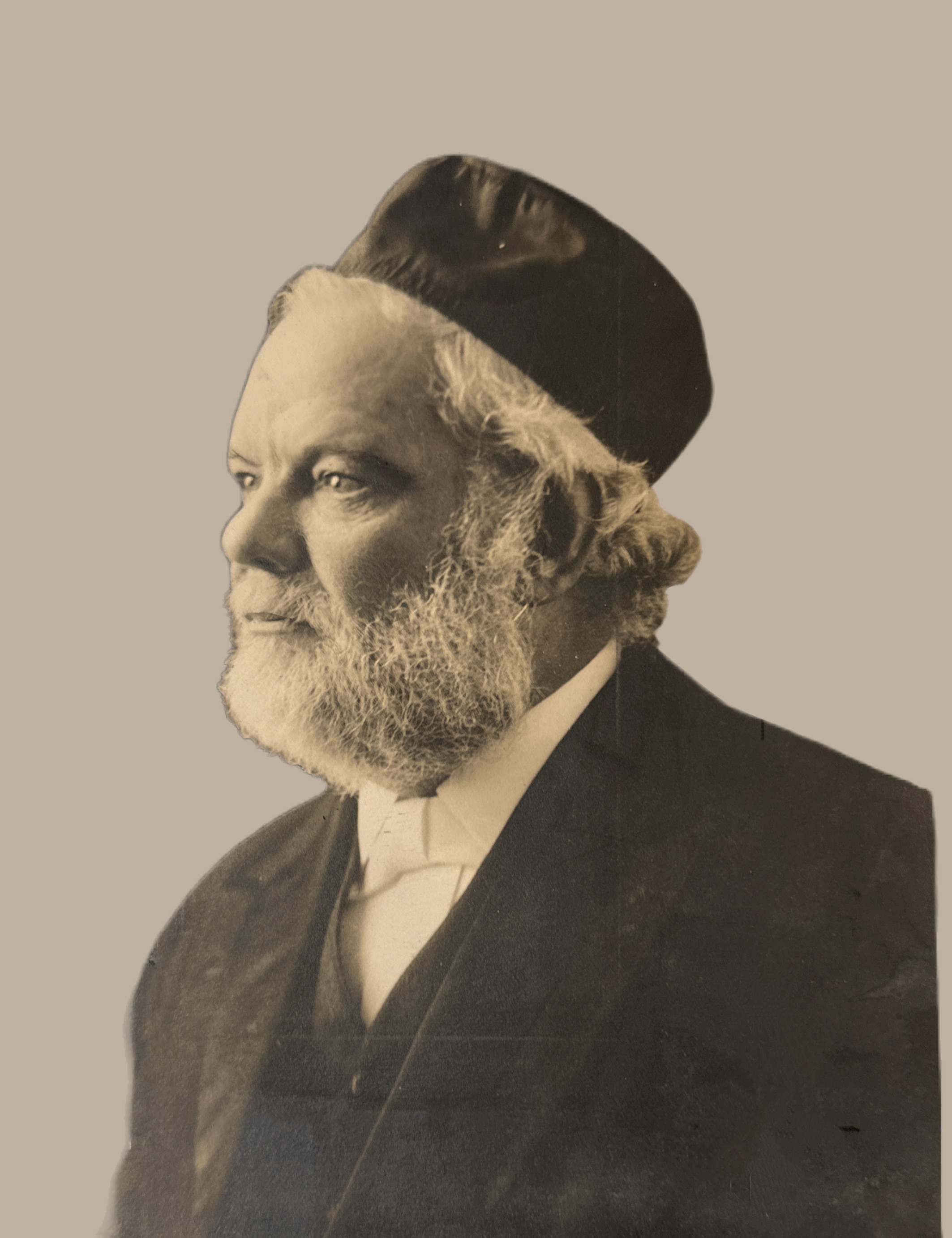
- Rabbi Bernard Levinthal

Personal life
- Born: May 12, 1864 Kovno
- Died: September 23, 1952 (aged 88) Philadelphia
- Buried: Mikveh Israel Cemetery (Beth El Emeth)
- Spouse: Mimie Levinthal (–1929, her death); Sarah Samson (1935–1952, his death)

Religious life
- Religion: Judaism
- Denomination: Orthodox

Jewish leader
- Predecessor: Rabbi Eleazar Kleinberg
- Successor: Rabbi H. Zvi Gottesman
- Synagogue: Congregation B'nai Abraham
- Began: 1891
- Ended: 1952
- Yahrtzeit: 4 Tishrei 5713
- Semikhah: Rabbi Isaac Elchonon Spektor

Rabbi Bernard Louis Levinthal (Hebrew: הרב דוב אריה בן הרב אברהם הכהן לבינטל; May 12, 1864 – September 23, 1952), the "Dean of U.S. Rabbis," built Philadelphia's first Eastern European Orthodox Jewish community from his arrival in the United States in 1891 until his death in 1952. Rabbi Levinthal helped found American Jewish Orthodox institutions including Yeshiva University in 1896, the Orthodox Union in 1898, Mizrachi in 1902, and the American Agudas Harabbanim. His grave is in Congregation Mikveh Israel's 55th Street Cemetery in West Philadelphia.

== Early life ==
Levinthal was born on the festival of Lag BaOmer in Kaunas (Kovno), Lithuania to a prominent, 17-generation rabbinical family. One of his ancestors was the 17th century author of Beth Hillel and Masse Hashem.

In 1888, he received semicha (rabbinic ordination) from rabbis Isaac Elchanan Spektor and Samuel Mohilever. The following year his father-in-law became rabbi of Bnai Abraham in Philadelphia, Pennsylvania, but died within a few years and was replaced in September 1891 by Levinthal, who remained the rabbi there until his death in September 1952.

== Rabbinic career in America ==
In the early 1890s he helped start the Communal Hebrew School, the city's first daily Jewish school, and in the early 1900s Yeshiva Mishkan Yisroel — both predecessors to the United Hebrew Schools and Yeshivos.

In 1896, he helped found what became Yeshiva University's rabbinical seminary. He served as Yeshiva's president and later, in 1941, joined its board.

In the early 1900s, Rabbi Levinthal helped organize a central kosher supervision committee across eighteen Philadelphia synagogues. He co-founded one of the early rabbinical membership organizations across the United States and Canada, the Agudath Harabbanim. His activity in kashrut also led to the passage of Philadelphia's kosher law.

Seeking a "kosher" social outlet for congregants, Levinthal encouraged the creation of the social club The Independent Order Brith Sholom in 1905. In 1918, he helped found the American Jewish Congress.

1,000 people attended his 70th birthday celebration. The heads of the American Jewish Committee, the Zionist Organization of America, the Agudath HaRabanim, and America Mizrachi were among the speakers.

His wife, Mimie, died in 1929 and in 1935 he married the former Sarah Samson. He had four sons and at least one daughter, Lena Ehrlich, the mother-in-law of Samuel Belkin.

His sons include Rabbi Israel H. Levinthal of Brooklyn and Judge Louis E. Levinthal of Philadelphia. Helen Levinthal, the first woman to complete rabbinical training (and who graduated her course but was denied ordination), was his granddaughter.

Levinthal was a mentor to Bernard Revel, the first president of Yeshiva University's Yeshiva College, whose marriage Levinthal officiated at.

== Politics and Zionism ==
The Levinthals were known to President Taft, and attended his 25th wedding anniversary in 1911, while he was in office.

While he was unable to travel from America to Switzerland for the First World Jewish Congress in 1897, he did write a speech that was read there. He attended the 1936 Congress, with his second wife.

Levinthal was a founder of the Orthodox Union in 1898 and of Mizrachi (now Religious Zionists of America) in 1902; he was present at the 1906 founding of the American Jewish Committee as a delegate, and helped organize the American Jewish Congress in 1917. In 1919, he was sent by the American Jewish Committee to the Peace Conference at Versailles, one of only nine Jewish representatives. While there, he advocated for successful resolutions supporting religious freedom and Jewish civil rights of Jews in Europe.

His synagogue mourned secularist Zionism founder Theodor Herzl on his death in 1904. After Levinthal's Versailles Peace Conference trip, he publicly expressed support for the British Mandate of Palestine, and a wish to move there and help construct a new Jewish state there should one be established. He was Honorary Vice-chairman of the United Palestine Appeal, forerunner of the United Israel Appeal, in 1926.

In 1939, as news began to spread of maltreatment of Jews throughout Europe in the leadup to the Holocaust, Levinthal represented the United Jewish Appeal in a fundraiser throughout the United States to help the European Jews. Some of the funds were used to help resettle them in Mandatory Palestine.

He supported Liberty Bond sales, going so far as to cross religious lines, bringing reform rabbis and Catholic leaders into his home to strategize sales. He acted similarly in 1944 for War Bond sales. He gave encouragement to Jewish soldiers and sailors.

Levinthal criticized the Jewish Theological Seminary for requiring its students to attain a secular college degree.
