= Moses Shulvass =

Moses (Mosheh) Avigdor Shulvass (Szulwas) (1909–1988) was an American rabbi and historian of Jewish history.

== Life ==
Born in Poland, he became a rabbi in Warsaw in 1930 and received his PhD from University of Berlin in 1934. He relocated to pre-state Israel, then in 1947 Baltimore, later Chicago, and later Los Angeles. He was a professor at Spertus College from 1951 until 1971 and authored 12 books. He became a distinguished professor and the chairman of the graduate studies department. He was a fellow of the American Academy of Jewish Research. He specialized in Italian Jewish history particularly the Italian Renaissance period. Shulvass became an influential historian and his books were widely read. Jacob Burckhardt was an influence on Shulvass' work per Daniel Jütte.

Robert Bonfil, according to David B. Ruderman, considers Shulvass alongside Heinrich Graetz, Cecil Roth, and Isaac Barzilay as secularly oriented historians of the Renaissance that identified it with enlightenment and cosmopolitan progress, while taking a critical perspective of traditional Ashkenazic culture.

== Publications ==
- Shulvass, Moses A. (1948). "The Knowledge of Antiquity among the Italian Jews of the Renaissance". Proceedings of the American Academy for Jewish Research. 18: 291–299. doi:10.2307/3622202. ISSN 0065-6798. JSTOR 3622202.
- Shulvass, Moses A. (1951). "The Jewish Population in Renaissance Italy". Jewish Social Studies. 13 (1): 3–24. ISSN 0021-6704. JSTOR 4464939.
- Shulvass, Moses Avigdor (1973). The Jews in the world of the Renaissance. Internet Archive. Leiden, Brill. ISBN 978-90-04-03646-8.
- Shulvass, Moses A. (1982). The history of the Jewish people. Internet Archive. Chicago: Regnery Gateway. ISBN 978-0-89526-652-1.
- "Medieval Ashkenazic Jewry's Knowledge of History and Historical Literature." The Solomon Goldman Lectures IV (1985): 1-27.
- Shulṿas, Mosheh Avigdor (2017). From East to West: The Westward Migration of Jews from Eastern Europe During the Seventeenth and Eighteenth Centuries. Chicago: Wayne State University Press. ISBN 978-0-8143-4345-6.
