= J. H. Chajes =

Researcher of Jewish mysticism

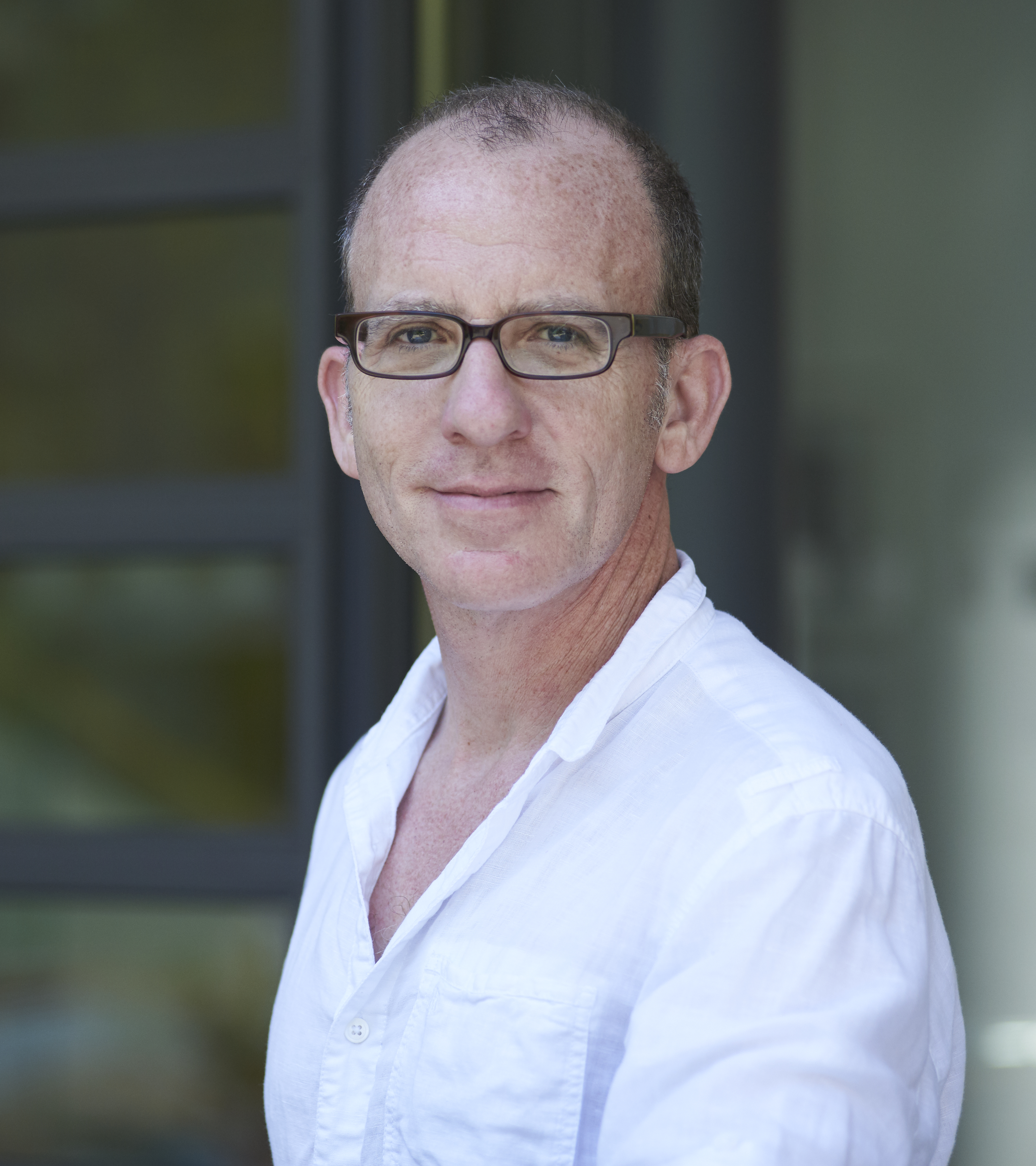
- Born: June 11, 1965 (age 61); Detroit, Michigan, U.S.
- Other name: Yossi Chajes
- Education: University of Michigan; Yale University
- Known for: The Ilanot Project
- Scientific career
- Fields: Jewish history, Jewish culture, Kabbalah
- Workplaces: University of Haifa
- Doctoral advisor: David B. Ruderman

J. H. Chajes (/ˈhaɪɛs/ or /ˈhɑːjɛs/; Josef Hillel/Jeffrey Howard; Hebrew: יוסף (יוסי) חיות, Hebrew pronunciation: [joˌsef ˌjosi χaˈjut]; born June 11, 1965) is the Sir Isaac and Lady Edith Wolfson Professor of Jewish Thought in the Department of Jewish History at the University of Haifa. He is a Jewish cultural historian whose work has been devoted to the intersections of Kabbalah, magic, and science in the early modern period. In the last decade, he has become the leading scholar of visual Kabbalah, having founded The Ilanot Project and published the first major work on the previously unstudied genre of ilanot (scrolls featuring the arboreal diagram commonly known as the "Tree of life"). He is the author of Between Worlds: Dybbuks, Exorcists, and Early Modern Judaism and The Kabbalistic Tree. In 2013, he was elected to the Executive Board of the World Union for Jewish Studies, where he serves as Division Chair for rabbinic literature, Jewish law, and Jewish thought.

== Life and education ==
J. H. Chajes was born in Detroit, Michigan (USA) to the composer and pianist Julius Chajes and the mezzo-soprano, Annette Schoen Chajes. Chajes studied piano with his father and, for three years beginning at the age of eleven, performed piano concerti annually as a soloist with the Center Symphony Orchestra under his father's direction.

Chajes completed his B.A. in Jewish Studies at the University of Michigan in 1988 and an M.A. in history at the same institution in 1989. After serving for a year as the first volunteer Jewish educator sent by the American Jewish Joint Distribution Committee to Mumbai (then Bombay), India and studying Talmud for another year in Jerusalem at a traditional yeshiva, he was awarded a Wexner Graduate Fellowship to embark upon doctoral studies at Yale University. His doctoral thesis, Spirit Possession and the Construction of Early Modern Jewish Religiosity (1999), was supervised by David B. Ruderman.

Chajes was a Fulbright Visiting Research Fellow at the Hebrew University in 1995-96 and a Yad haNadiv Post-Doctoral Fellow at the same institution in 1999. From 1996 to 1999 he was also a research fellow at the Shalom Hartman Institute in Jerusalem. Chajes has been a visiting professor at the Jewish Theological Seminary in New York, a three-time fellow at the Katz Center for Advanced Judaic Studies at the University of Pennsylvania, and a fellow at the Israel Institute for Advanced Studies in Jerusalem and the Forschungskolleg Humanwissenschaften of Goethe University Frankfurt.

== Scholarship ==
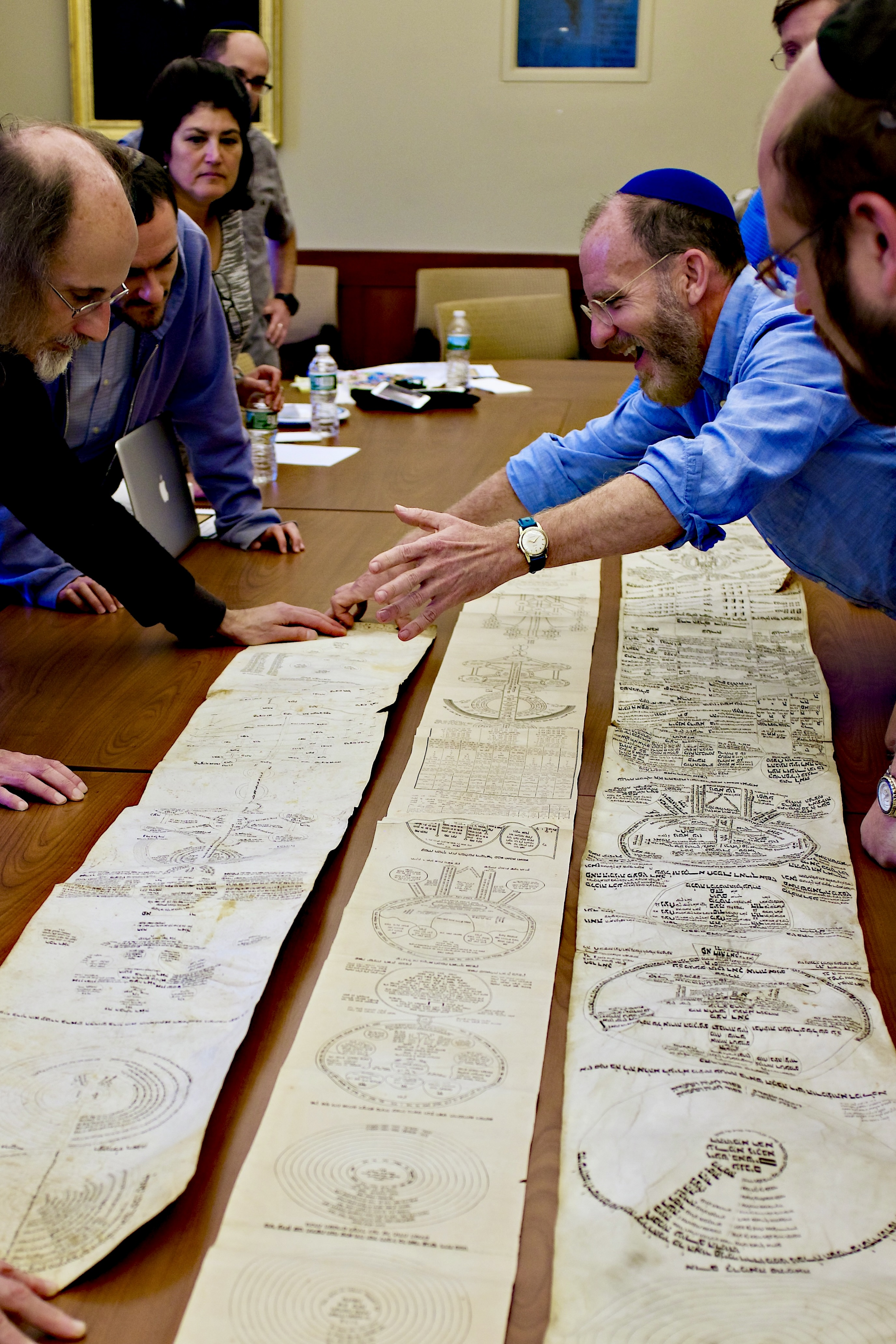
Chajes leading the Lehmann Memorial Master Workshop on the History of the Jewish Book, University of Pennsylvania (2019)

Chajes's research focuses on the intersection of Kabbalah, magic, and science in Jewish cultural history. He has written on spirit possession and exorcism, egodocuments, women's religiosity, Jewish attitudes towards magic, and, most recently, on the visualization of knowledge. Chajes's first book, Between Worlds: Dybbuks, Exorcists, and Early Modern Judaism (2003) was listed by The Wall Street Journal as among the top five books ever written on spirit possession, alongside Aldous Huxley's The Devils of Loudun. Chajes's foundational book, The Kabbalistic Tree, published in November 2022, has been lauded as a "monumental achievement that will be valuable to scholars and general readers interested in Judaism, religion, and art history."

== Selected published works ==
- "Judgments Sweetened: Possession and Exorcism in Early Modern Jewish Culture." In: Journal of Early Modern History I, no. 2 (1997): 124–69.
- "Female Jewish Mystics? The Evidence of R. Hayyim Vital’s Sefer ha-Hezyonot." (Hebrew) In: Zion 67, 2 (2002): 139–162.
- Between Worlds: Dybbuks, Exorcists and Early Modern Judaism. University of Pennsylvania Press, 2003.
- "Accounting for the Self: Preliminary Generic-Historical Reflections on Early Modern Jewish Egodocuments." In: Jewish Quarterly Review, Vol. 95, No. 1 (Winter 2005): 1–15.
- Posseduti ed esorcisti nel mondo ebraico. Bollati Boringhieri, 2010.
- "Too Holy to Print’: Taboo Anxiety and the Publishing of Practical Hebrew Esoterica." In: Jewish History 26 (2012): 247–62.
- The Visualization of Knowledge in Medieval and Early Modern Europe. Turnhout: Brepols, 2020 (edited with Marcia Kupfer, Adam S. Cohen).
- "Imaginative Thinking with a Lurianic Diagram." In: Jewish Quarterly Review 110, 1 (Winter 2020): 30–63.
- "Spheres, Sefirot, and the Imaginal Astronomical Discourse of Classical Kabbalah." In: Harvard Theological Review 113:2 (2020): 230–262.
- "Re-envisioning the Evil Eye: Magic, Optical Theory, and Modern Supernaturalism in Jewish Thought." In: European Journal of Jewish Studies 15 (2020): 30–59.
- "The Kabbalistic Diagrams of Gershom Scholem." In: Ars Judaica 16 (2020): 125–54.
- The Kabbalistic Tree/האילן הקבלי. Pennsylvania State University Press, 2022.
