= Abraham A. Neuman =

Austrian-born American rabbi and historian (1890–1970)

- Born: September 23, 1890; Berezhany, Austria-Hungary (now Ukraine)
- Died: November 20, 1970 (aged 80); North Philadelphia, Pennsylvania
- Occupations: Rabbi, historian, college president

Abraham Aaron Neuman (September 23, 1890 – November 20, 1970) was an American rabbi, historian, and college president.

== Life ==
Neuman was born on September 23, 1890, in Berezhany, Austria-Hungary, the son of Max Neuman and Rachel Rose. He immigrated to America in 1898.

Neuman attended several parochial schools in New York City, New York. He graduated from Columbia University in 1909. In 1912, he received an A.M. from Columbia and was ordained a rabbi by the Jewish Theological Seminary. He received a D.H.L. from the Seminary in 1914. He became a history instructor at the Teachers' Institute at the Seminary in 1912, and in 1913 he joined the faculty of Dropsie College in Philadelphia, Pennsylvania. He became an associate professor there in 1923 and a professor in 1934. His two-volume book The Jews in Spain: Their Social, Political and Cultural Life During the Middle Ages, published in 1942, was a pioneer work that attempted for the first time to reconstruct the social life of Spanish Jews based on the rabbinic responsa and then-recently published archival material. He also wrote the biography Cyrus Adler in 1942. A Democrat, he was a presidential elector for the 1940 presidential election.

Neuman became president of Dropsie College following Cyrus Adler's death in 1940. Under him, the College expanded its curriculum and added departments in Middle Eastern studies, education, and philosophy. He served as president until he retired in 1966. He contributed to various scholarly periodicals, and many of his studies appeared in the 1953 Landmarks and Goals. He and Solomon Zeitlin edited The Jewish Quarterly Review from 1940 to 1966. He was active in developing the Zionist movement in America. Closely involved with Conservative Judaism, he served as rabbi of Congregation B'nai Jeshurun from 1919 to 1927 and of Congregation Mikveh Israel from 1927 to 1943, president of the Board of Jewish Ministers of Philadelphia, an Executive Council member of the United Synagogue, president of the United Synagogue's Philadelphia branch, and chairman of the United Synagogue's Palestine Committee that dedicated itself to building the Yeshurun Synagogue in Jerusalem. He was also an early advocate for developing a placement system for Conservative rabbis.

Neuman was an honorary fellow of the Jewish Academy of Arts and Sciences, vice-president and executive council member of the American Jewish Historical Society, a publication committee member of the Jewish Publication Society of America, an advisory committee member of the Adult Education Council for Philadelphia, a member of the NCCJ committee on religious organizations, an honorary member of the American Academy for Jewish Research, an editor of the Universal Jewish Encyclopedia, editorial board chairman of the Jewish Apocryphal Liter, and co-editor of Saadia Studies.

Neuman received several honorary degrees, including a LL.D. from the University of Pennsylvania and a D.H.L. from Hebrew Union College in 1945, a Litt.D. from the Jewish Theological Seminary in 1947, a L.H.D. from New York University in 1955, and a D.H.L. from Dropsie College in 1968. He was on the state advisory board of the Federal Writers' Project of Pennsylvania, the Better Philadelphia Committee, and the Committee of One Hundred. He served as a member of the Pennsylvania Constitution Commemoration Committee in 1937 to 1938, an honorary fellow of the Philadelphia Art Alliance and the Oriental Club, and a member of the American Historical Society, the American Oriental Society, the Rabbinical Assembly, the Historical Society of Pennsylvania, the Philmont Country Club, and the Round Table Club of Philadelphia. In 1919, he married Gladys Reed of Boston. They had a son, Cyrus Adler. He later divorced Gladys. In 1944 he married Elsie (Gans) Guggenheim, the daughter of Baltimore manufacturer Moses Godwin Gans and widow of Siegfried E. Guggenheim.

Neuman died at the Albert Einstein Medical Center on November 20, 1970.
