= Katz Center for Advanced Judaic Studies =

Postdoctoral research center focused on Judaism

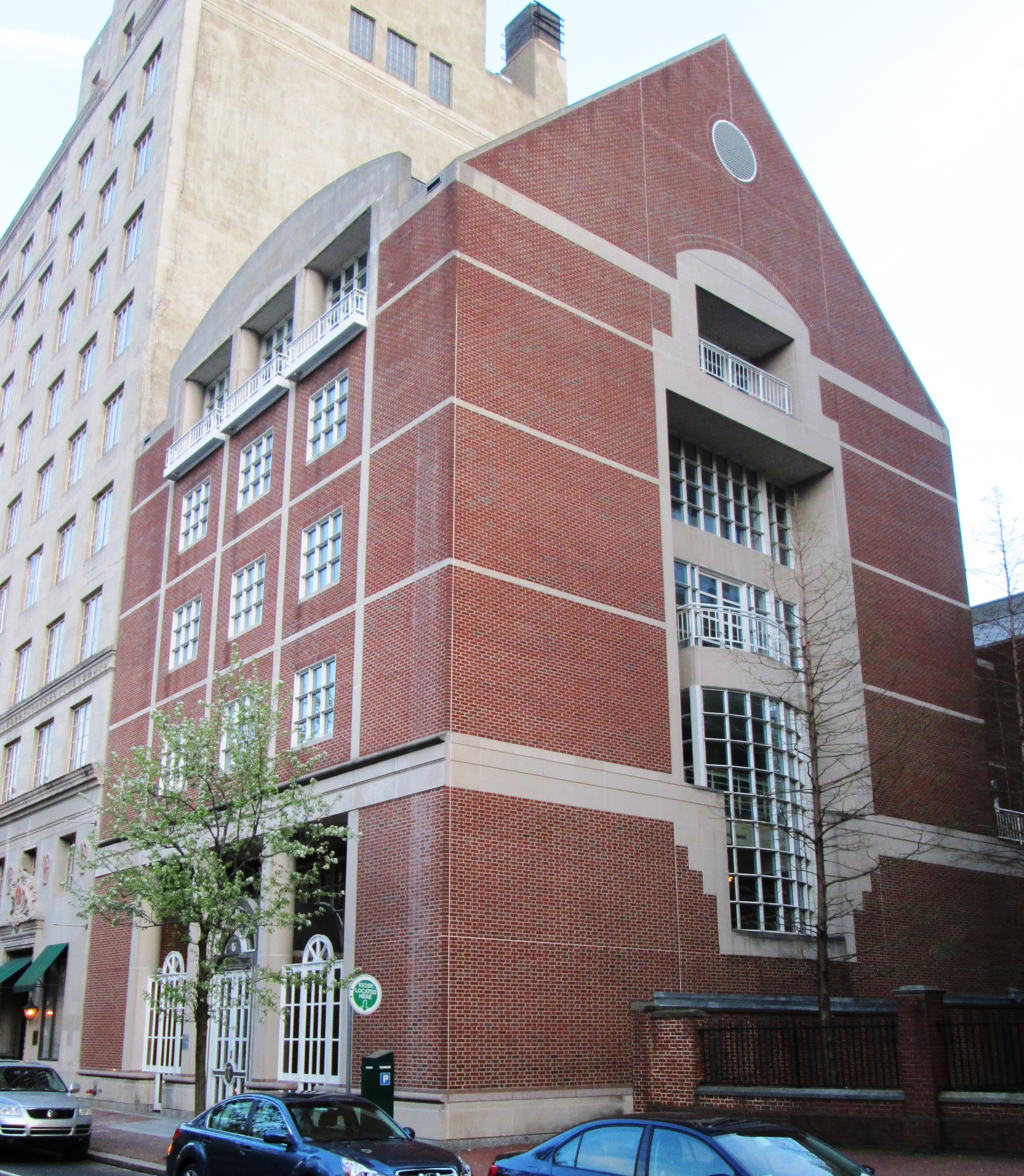
- The Katz Center's Building on Walnut Street
- Former names: Dropsie College for Hebrew and Cognate Learning; Annenberg Research Institute
- Established: 1993
- Director: Steven Weitzman
- Location: 420 Walnut Street, Philadelphia, Pennsylvania; 39.9473°N 75.1486°W
- Website: https://katz.sas.upenn.edu/

The Herbert D. Katz Center for Advanced Judaic Studies at the University of Pennsylvania, commonly called the Katz Center, is a postdoctoral research center devoted to the study of Jewish history and civilization.

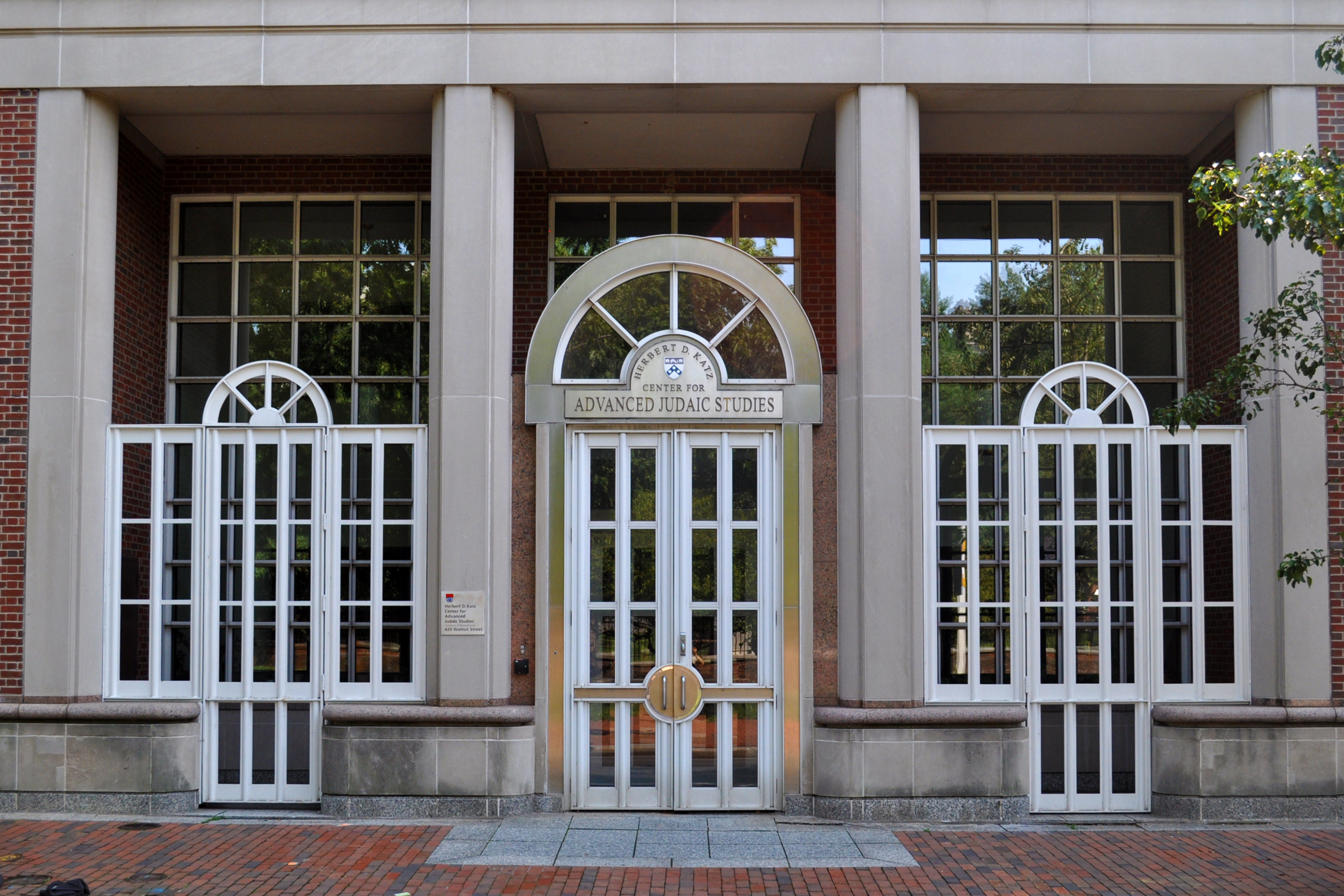
Katz Center for Advanced Judaic Studies 420 Walnut St Philadelphia PA

== History ==
The Katz Center is the continuation of two pioneering institutions devoted to advanced research: Dropsie College for Hebrew and Cognate Learning and the Annenberg Research Institute. Dropsie College was the first accredited doctoral program in Judaic studies in the world. The Annenberg Research Institute was a center for advanced study in Judaism, Christianity, and Islam founded in 1986 with staff and collections carried over from Dropsie College. The founding director of the Katz Center was David B. Ruderman. The current Ella Darivoff Director is Steven Weitzman.

The Katz Center was established in 1993 as a part of the School of Arts and Sciences at the University of Pennsylvania. It was first named the Center for Judaic Studies (CJS); later, the Center for Advanced Judaic Studies (CAJS)—and in 2008, the Katz family endowed the center in memory of former board chair and philanthropist Herbert D. Katz. It is located in an award-winning building across from Independence National Historical Park in Center City Philadelphia.

The Katz Center houses offices for scholars who are in residence throughout the academic year for postdoctoral research, as well as an extensive library of Judaica, a reading room, and seminar and meeting spaces.

== Fellowship program ==
The Katz Center's primary activity is an academic fellowship program, which brings scholars from around the world to Philadelphia for a semester or a year. The program supports approximately 20 fellows each year; scholars apply if their current research fits the annual theme.

Weekly seminars allow fellows to share their findings with each other and with invited scholarly guests; annual conferences are open to the wider academic community.

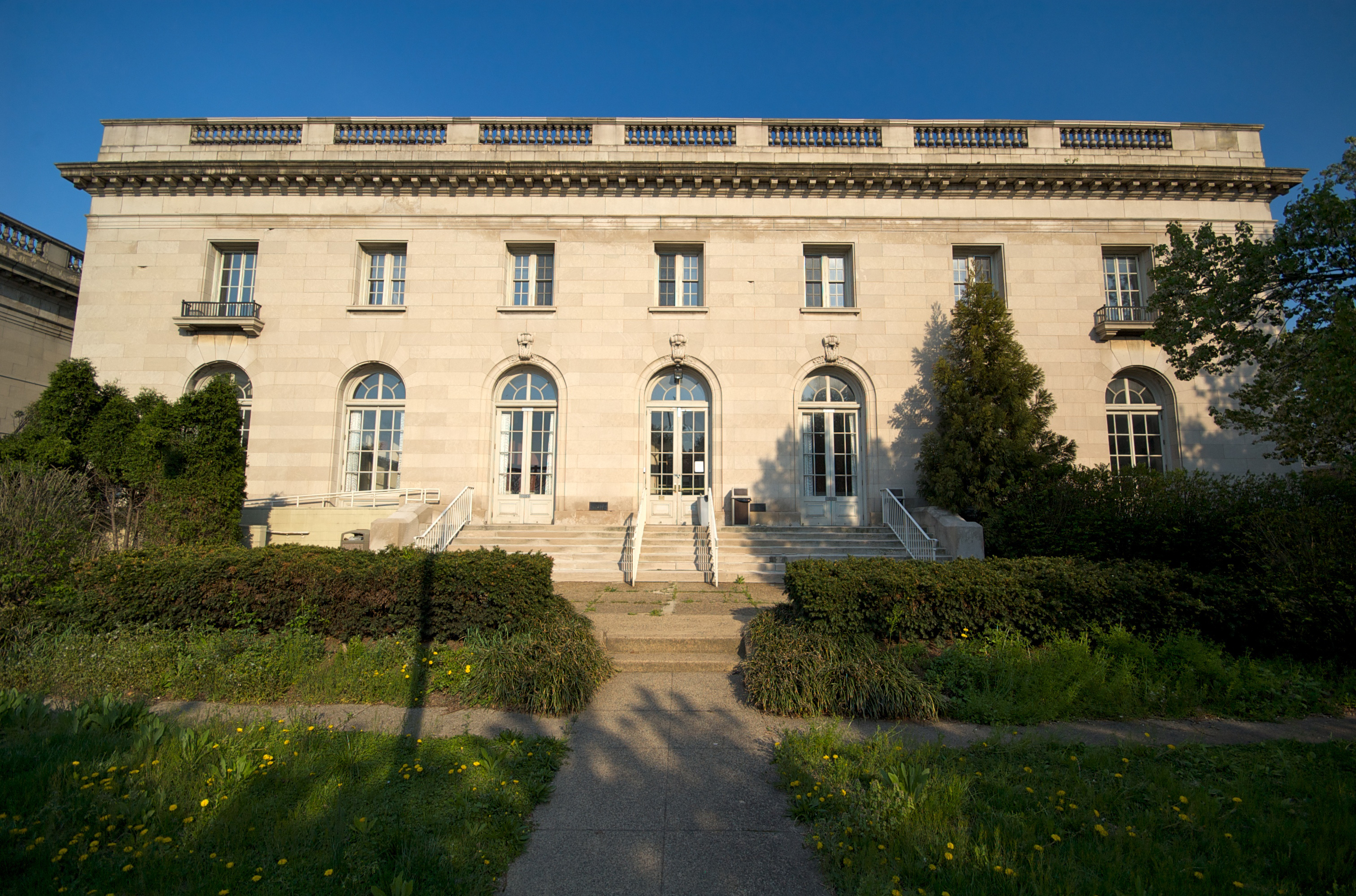
Dropsie University Complex

In addition, the Katz Center offers public programs and a summer intensive course for graduate students.

== Library at the Katz Center ==
The combination of the Dropsie/Annenberg library with the Judaica holdings of the Penn Libraries resulted in a 350,000-volume collection of Judaica, including more than 8,000 rare books and an assortment of cuneiform tablets.

There are also 451 codices in eleven alphabets and 24 languages and dialects. Some of the languages and dialects represented include Hebrew, English, German, Yiddish, Ladino, Arabic, Latin, Judeo-Arabic, Armenia, Telugu, and Syriac. Fragments from the Cairo Geniza and others written in Coptic and Demotic on papyrus round out the collection.

The library also holds the personal letters of more than 50 Jewish-American leaders from the 1800s and 1900s, including Isaac Leeser, Sabato Morais, and Abraham A. Neuman (three ministers of Congregation Mikveh Israel in Philadelphia), Cyrus Adler (president, Dropsie College, Mikveh Israel, American Jewish Committee, Jewish Theological Seminary of America; librarian, Smithsonian Institution), Charles Cohen (president, Mikveh Israel, Fairmount Park Commission), his journalist sister Mary M. Cohen, Yiddish journalist Ben Zion Goldberg, and the benefactor Moses Dropsie.

== Publications ==
The Katz Center houses the Jewish Quarterly Review, the oldest continuously published journal of Judaic studies in English. Founded in England in 1888 under the editorship of Claude Montefiore and Israel Abrahams, JQR first came to the U.S. in 1911 under the editorship of Solomon Schechter and Cyrus Adler. It is currently published by Penn Press.

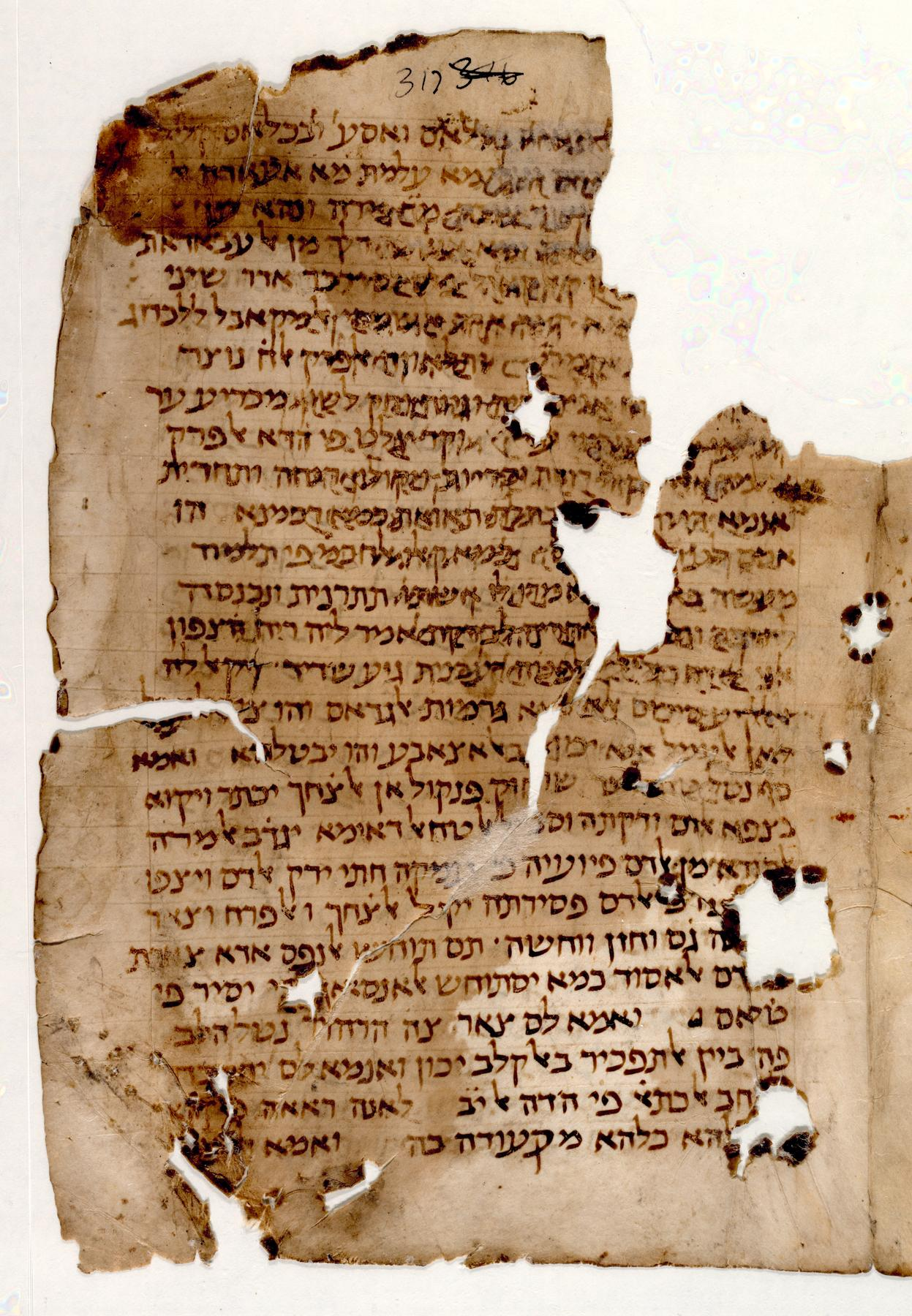
A Cairo Geniza fragment is part of the collection.

The Katz Center partners with the University of Pennsylvania Press to publish the book series Jewish Cultures and Contexts. The series is edited by Shaul Magid, Francesca Trivellato, and Steven Weitzman.

== Notable fellows ==
- Israel Bartal: winner of the Landau Prize for the research of the history of the Land of Israel (2009)
- Menachem Ben-Sasson: former member of the Knesset for Kadima; former president of the Hebrew University of Jerusalem (2009-2017).
- Amnon Ben-Tor: winner of the Israel Prize for archaeology (2019)
- Yoram Bilu: winner of the Israel Prize for Sociology and Anthropology (2013)
- Clémence Boulouque: fellow of the New Perspectives on the Origins, Context and Diffusion of the Academic Study of Judaism program (2014–2015); currently serves as the Carl and Bernice Witten Associate Professor of Jewish and Israel Studies in the Department of Religion at Columbia University in the City of New York.
- Richard I. Cohen: winner of the Arnold Wischnitzer Prize (1998)
- Natalie Zemon Davis: winner of the Holberg International Memorial Prize (2010); Companion of the Order of Canada; recipient of the National Humanities Medal (2012).
- Daniel J. Elazar: founder and former president of the Jerusalem Center for Public Affairs
- Yaakov Elman: founder of the field now known as Irano-Talmudica
- Seymour Gitin: winner of the Israel Museum's Percia Schimmel Prize (2004)
- Nurith Gertz: winner of the Brenner Prize for Literature (2009); recipient of the Israeli Book Publishers' Association Gold Award (2010).
- Moshe Greenberg: winner of the Israel Prize in Bible (1994)
- Bonnie Honig: winner of the Foundations of Political Thought Book Prize (1994)
- Gershon Hundert: winner of the Judaica Reference Award from the Association of Jewish Libraries (2008)
- Moshe Idel: winner of the Israel Prize for Jewish thought (1999)
- Sara Japhet: former president of the World Union of Jewish Studies (2005-2009); winner of the Israel Prize for Biblical studies (2004).
- Yosef Kaplan: winner of the Israel Prize for the history of the Jewish people (2013)
- Ruth Mazo Karras: co-winner of the American Historical Association's Joan Kelly Memorial Prize (2012)
- Barbara Kirshenblatt-Gimblett: Chief Curator of the Core Exhibition at the POLIN Museum of the History of Polish Jews; recipient of the Foundation for Jewish Culture award for lifetime achievement (2008).
- Norman Kleeblatt: winner of the National Jewish Book Award (2009); former chief curator at the Jewish Museum (1982-2017).
- David C. Kraemer: director of the Joseph J. and Dora Abbell Library at the Jewish Theological Seminary of America
- Shaul Magid: winner of the American Academy of Religion Award (2008)
- Michael A. Meyer: winner of the National Jewish Book Award (1968, 1989, 1997); co-founder of the Association for Jewish Studies.
- David Nirenberg: dean of the University of Chicago Divinity School; founding Roman Family Director of the Neubauer Collegium for Culture and Society.
- David B. Ruderman: founding director of the Katz Center for Advanced Judaic Studies; winner of the National Jewish Book Award (2010)
- Maurice Samuels: director of the Yale Program for the Study of Antisemitism; winner of the Gaddis Smith International Book Prize (2004).
- Edwin Seroussi: winner of the Israel Prize for the study of culture, art, and musicology (2018)
- Stephanie B. Siegmund: winner of the American Historical Association's Herbert Baxter Adams Prize (2006)
- Gershon Shaked: winner of the Israel Prize for Hebrew literature (1993)
- Anita Shapira: winner of the Israel Prize for History (2008)
- Anna Shternshis: co-creator and co-director of the 61st Annual Grammy Awards nominated album Yiddish Glory
- Reuven Snir: winner of the Tchernichovsky Prize for Translation (2014)
- Michael C. Steinlauf: director of Poland's branch of the United States Holocaust Memorial Museum
- Guy Stroumsa: winner of the Alexander von Humboldt Research Award (2008); Chevalier de l’Ordre du Mérite.
- Susan Rubin Suleiman: recipient of France's Legion of Honor merit (2008)
- S. Ilan Troen: founding director of the journal Israel Studies
- Yaron Tsur: co-founder of the Open University of Israel
- Chava Turniansky: winner of the Israel Prize for Jewish language and literature (2013)
- Elliot R. Wolfson: winner of the American Academy of Religion Award (1995, 2012); winner of the National Jewish Book Award (1995, 2005).
- Joseph Yahalom: winner of the Bialik Prize (2012); winner of the Ben-Zvi Prize for Lifetime Achievement (2003).
