= Herbert Friedenwald =

Jewish-American librarian and historian (1870–1944)

Herbert Friedenwald (September 20, 1870 – April 28, 1944) was a Jewish-American librarian and historian.

== Life ==
Friedenwald was born on September 20, 1870, in Baltimore, Maryland, the son of merchant Moses Friedenwald and English immigrant Jane Ahlborn. His grandfather was German immigrant Jonas Friedenwald, his uncle was prominent physician Aaron Friedenwald, and his sister Racie Adler was a community leader and the wife of Cyrus Adler.

Friedenwald graduated from Johns Hopkins University in 1890 and received a Ph.D. from the University of Pennsylvania in 1894. He was the first superintendent of the Library of Congress manuscript department from 1897 to 1900. While working there, he edited a separate calendar of the Library's Washington manuscripts. He studied the early history of the United States specifically, writing mainly on the Continental Congress. He was the Philadelphia delegate to the Sixth Zionist Congress in 1903, and by 1904 he was residing in Philadelphia.

Friedenwald studied history under John B. McMaster at the University of Pennsylvania. He was one the forty-one founding members of the American Jewish Historical Society in 1892. He was elected recording secretary of the Society upon its founding and served in that position for two terms for a total of seventeen years. He was also corresponding secretary from 1898 to 1903. He wrote a number of articles for the Society's Publications of the American Jewish Historical Society, mainly focused on 18th-century trends and events across the American continent and the British West Indies as well as the development and spread of religious liberty in the New World. His doctoral thesis, called The Declaration of Independence: An Interpretation and Analysis, was published in 1904 and earned him the John Marshall Prize from Johns Hopkins University in 1905. He contributed articles for The Jewish Encyclopedia, co-writing the article on the United States with Julius Eisenstein.

Friedenwald became secretary of the American Jewish Committee when it was founded in 1906, serving in that position for the next seven years. As the committee's first secretary, he helped implement its constitution and bylaws, formulated organizational procedures, and helped established and maintained cordial relations with its membership. When the Committee worked to abrogate the Russo-American Treaty of 1832, he did research for the committee before congressional investigations, helped organize reports, and helped lead a nationwide correspondence campaign to end the treaty. He edited the American Jewish Year Book from 1908 to 1912 and was a member of the Jewish Publication Society's Publication Committee, which published the Year Book. He left the Committee in 1913, after which he traveled across the country and the world. He ultimately settled in Washington, D.C., and became an unofficial Jewish representative. In 1936, he established Friedenwald Foundation, which promoted Jewish education in Baltimore, with his wife Rose Diebold Friedenwald.

Friedenwald died from a stroke in the Wardman Park Hotel on April 28, 1944. He was buried in Baltimore.
