= Steven Weitzman =

Steven Weitzman may refer to:

- Steven Weitzman (sculptor) (born 1952), American public artist and designer
- Steven Weitzman (scholar) (born 1965), American scholar of Jewish studies and religious studies
