= Isaac Barzilay =

Isaac Eisenstein-Barzilay (1915–2006) was a scholar and professor of Jewish history. Born in Vilkaviskis, Lithuania, the son of a rabbi, and later in Yashenofki, Poland, he attended the Hebrew University of Jerusalem in 1933, before moving to the United States in 1947, where he worked under Salo Baron, who was a great influence on his work, at Columbia University and received a PhD in 1955. He taught at Wayne State University before returning to Columbia in 1959 where he taught until retirement. He served as president of the American Academy for Jewish Research and received an honorary doctorate from the Jewish Theological Seminary, New York where he also taught. He specialized in the study of the Haskalah. David B. Ruderman considers Barzilay's study of Joseph Delmedigo to be the most important since Abraham Geiger. Barzilay connects the German enlightenment to the Italian, is skeptical of the kabbalah, and interested in Jewish rationalism within the context of Delmedigo's work in Jewish philosophy.

== Publications ==
- Barzilay, Isaac (1974). Yoseph Shlomo Delmedigo (Yashar of Candia) : his life, works and times. Internet Archive. Leiden : Brill. ISBN 978-90-04-03972-8.
- Barzilay, Isaac (1999). Manasseh of Ilya: Precursor of Modernity Among the Jews of Eastern Europe. Magnes Press, Hebrew University. ISBN 978-965-223-990-7.
- Barzilay, Isaac E. (2020). Between Reason and Faith: Anti-Rationalism in Italian Jewish Thought 1250–1650. Publications in Near and Middle East Studies. Series A (Reprint 2020 ed.). Berlin Boston: De Gruyter Mouton. ISBN 978-3-11-230700-7.
