= Yaron Tsur =

- ירון צור
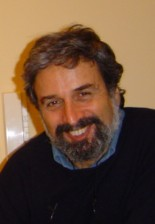
- Born: June 19, 1948 (age 78); Jerusalem, Israel
- Education: Hebrew University of Jerusalem
- Awards: Shazar prize (2002); Toledano prize (2003); Israel Prize (2025)
- Scientific career
- Fields: History of the Jews under Muslim rule
- Workplaces: Open University of Israel; Tel Aviv University
- Thesis: France and the Jews of Tunisia: French Policy Toward the Country's Jews and the Activities of the Jewish Elites in the Transition from Independent Muslim Rule to Colonial Rule, 1873-1888 (1988)
- Doctoral advisor: Pesach Shinar

Yaron Tsur (Hebrew: ירון צור; born June 19, 1948), an historian of the Jews in the Muslim lands in the modern era, is amongst the founders of the Open University of Israel, a professor in the department of Jewish history at Tel Aviv University and a former chairperson of its graduate school of Jewish studies. He is a pioneer in the field of Digital Humanities in Israel and the founder of the "Historical jewish press" website. He is the recipient of the Israel Prize for 2025 in the field of Jewish History.

== Biography ==
Yaron Tsur was born in Jerusalem to a German-Jewish father and to a mother of Yemenite extraction. During his childhood and youth in Jerusalem, he sojourned with his parents in the home of his Yemenite grandfather in the Nahlat Ahim neighborhood, on the border of the more established and well known Rehavia neighborhood. Subsequently, Tsur would reflect in the introduction to his Torn Community on how this unique residential setting would mold both his sense of ethnic belonging as an Ashkenazi-Mizrahi hybrid as well as his professional path as a historian.

As a youth Tsur studied music at the Jerusalem Conservatory and took up further studies in the field as Rubin Musical academy. During his mandatory military service Tsur served as an intelligence officer and reached the rank of major in the reserves. After he completed his service in the Israel Defense Forces Tsur found employment as a skit writer for the youth department of the Kol Yisrael ('Voice of Israel') radio station. Politically active as well, he was a central figure and organizer in the Peace Now.

Tsur completed his three academic degrees at the Hebrew University of Jerusalem. He master's thesis dealt with a series of anti-Jewish disturbances that took place on Tunisian soil at the close of World War I. Subsequently, he devoted his doctoral dissertation to the Jewish minority in Tunisia during the transformative era from independent Muslim rule to French colonial occupation. The title of his doctoral dissertation was "France and the Jews of Tunisia: French Policy Toward the Country's Jews and the Activities of the Jewish Elites in the Transition from Independent Muslim Rule to Colonial Rule, 1873-1888", and his doctoral advisor was Prof. Pesach Shinar.

Tsur is married to Nadine Kuperty-Tsur, an associate professor of French literature at Tel Aviv University, and the father of two sons, Daniel and Itamar, both from a previous marriage.

== The Open University ==
In 1975 Tsur began a long lasting association with the Open University of Israel. Initially he co-designed 'From Jerusalem to Yavneh', the first course in the field of Jewish history to appear under the auspices of this unique and brand new institution. Subsequently, he chaired the academic team that produced 'Jews in a period of transformations', a course that for the next three and a half decades would offer Open University students a challenging survey of the Modern Jewish experience. At the height of his tenure Tsur designed a series of advanced courses in tandem with his own research interest in Jewish history in Islamic lands during the modern period. The first course book produced as part of this effort, co-authored with Dr. Hagar Hillel, was a study of the community of Casablanca during the colonial period.

== Tel Aviv University ==
As of 1990 Tsur has been on the faculty of the Jewish history department at Tel Aviv University, his main academic home. Rising through the ranks he briefly served as chair of the department (2007) before being tapped to chair the university's Chaim Rosenberg graduate school of Jewish studies. During his TAU tenure Tsur has taught numerous surveys, as well as advanced courses in his fields of expertise.

== Scholarship ==
=== Tunisia ===
Tsur's entry point into the field of Jewish history in Islamic lands was his study of the formation of French policy toward Tunisia's Jewish minority as the country ceased to be a sovereign Muslim state and became a European colonial possession. In this trailblazing work Tsur identified the dominant and unprecedented role played by Western European Jewish organizations and entities in determining the direction Jewish existence in the world of Islam would now take in tandem with colonial penetration and designs. Subsequently, Tsur would concur with Edward Said's model of Orientalism Orientalism as a heuristic device for comprehending the European-non European relationship during the colonial era.

=== Jewish Society in Colonial North Africa; A 'sectional' society ===
In his monograph Torn Community: The Jews of Morocco and Nationalism 1943–1954, as well as in related essays, Tsur suggests complementing two classic models of stratification in colonial societies; class, determined by economic potential, as well as the more basic hierarchy between 'European' and 'native', with a third category of analysis based on the individual's cultural capital. The latter component, to Tsur's way of thinking, provides class determinism with a greater measure of historical agency, at the same time it manages to soften the rigid distinction between European and native. In the specifically Jewish context this provides for a whole host of possibilities with one individual belonging to multiple sectors and even serving as an invaluable mediator between them. The dynamic nature of the field as historically reconstructed by Tsur allows for more change and mobility between sections or actual economic markets.

An important distinction offered by Tsur in this context is that of 'Westernized' individuals, whose preferred means of communication are one or multiple European languages, as opposed to the Maskil, a type still within the native camp, but adamantly promoting modernization by means of native mediums of communication such as the shared language of high culture, Hebrew, as well as a local Judeo-Arabic dialect.

After successfully testing his model on North African soil, Tsur has used it to probe pre-colonial Jewish societies that still functioned within an imperial setting, i.e. the Ottoman Empire. He has also utilized it in order to gain fresh insight into the strained relations that existed between Mercantile (especially Western) Sephardi satellite communities and local Arabized ones.

=== Israel's Ethnic problem ===
Not surprisingly, Tsur is equally keen to find out how contacts between European and non-European within the Jewish polity have been transformed during the Zionist era, as well as on the ground in Jewish Palestine. Accordingly, he finds complexity where more rigid post-colonial minded scholars would prefer to concentrate solely on rigid dichotomies. According to Tsur's findings, if in the pre-state Yishuv Zionist technocrats were already directing non-European arrivals to fulfill menial roles and peripheral niches, all the more so when already in 1949 Ashkenazi spokesmen sounded doomsday warnings of how the Western seeming success story of the New Hebrew state would be permanently damaged by the Asiatic hordes now knocking at Israel's doors. To be sure, previous (and mostly apologetic) interpretations of the curbing of the mass Aliyah from French North Africa, first and foremost Morocco, by means of a medical selective process and series of quotas, rested solely on economic considerations that had been articulated by representative bodies of the absorbing apparatus such as relevant departments of the Jewish agency. Tsur, however, has successfully examined things afresh and introduced into the equation naked cultural fears, and even panic publicly voiced by the Ashkenazi leadership of the Jewish state. He has originally tracked the subsequent history of Israeli ethnic strife as being a two-sided conflict; occasionally exacerbated discretely by the Ashkenazi elite (1949 and 1984) and in other times (1959 and 1971) openly ignited by the Mizrahi subaltern class.

In so doing Tsur identifies two, partly contradictory world forces at play, nationalism and colonialism, constantly shaping and reshaping relations between European Jews and the Jews of Asia and Africa in the modern period. As an Israeli historian with a deep interest in the annals of Israeli society, Tsur sees this creative tension as vital force in shaping both ethnic stratification but also occasional mobility within the Jewish polity.

In recent years Tsur has returned to exploring Jewish-Muslim relations in various pre-modern and modern settings.

=== Digital Humanities ===
Tsur has enjoyed a parallel career as an academic entrepreneur in the currently blossoming field of the digital humanities. His first efforts in this direction was the creation of a 'Jews from Islamic lands' heritage website under the auspices of Tel Aviv University's humanities faculty, where students would have access to mainly secondary material on the subject, especially scanned for this purpose, as well as to maps and other means of visual illustration that enhance and enrich their learning experience. Eventually this website began a continuing association with the Israeli ministry of Education, and is now expanding its content.

In 2004 Tsur founded "website of Jewish newspapers", renamed a year later to "Historical Jewish Press" (JPress). It is a joint venture between TAU and Israel's National Library. It uses a search engine capable of multi-lingual searches of scores of Jewish serials from around the world within a few seconds. The initial goal was to scan the entire Hebrew language press, which is still ongoing. Serials now searchable include Doar Hayom, Davar, Al-Hamishmar, Maariv, Hatzofeh and Herut. Many other Jewish languages have found a home on this website, such as Ladino, Judeo-Arabic, Yiddish, as well as European languages such as English, French, Polish, and Hungarian. With close to 1.5 million pages already scanned and searchable, it is considered a global treasure trove of information on Modern Jewry, of which Tsur serves as academic director and editor in chief.

== Prizes and Academic activities and achievements ==
Tsur has spent sabbaticals and taught at a host of institutions abroad such as the Sorbonne in Paris, as well as in the EHESS. In the United States he has been a fellow at both the Katz Center for Advanced Judaic Studies at the University of Pennsylvania, and at the Frankel Institute at the University of Michigan at Ann Arbor. He has also taught at the Jewish Theological Seminary and recently in NYU. His Torn Community was awarded the Shazar prize in 2002 and the Toledano prize a year later. From the municipality of Paris Tsur received a medal honoring his efforts in establishing ties between Israeli and Tunisian historians. Tzur won the Israel Prize for 2025 in the field of Jewish History.

== Books ==
- The Jews of Casablance: A Study of Modernization in a Colonial Jewish Society, The Open University Press, Tel Aviv 1995 (Hebrew. in collaboration with H. Hillel).
- A Torn Community: The Jews of Morocco and Nationalism 1943–1954, Am Oved, Tel Aviv, 2001. (Hebrew)
- Notables and other Jews in the Ottoman Middle East 1759–1830, Mossad Bialik, Jerusalem 2016 (Hebrew)
