= Holit attack =

2023 massacre in Israel

- Part of the October 7 attacks
- Hayim Katsman (far left), a peace activist killed in the Hamas attack, seen here volunteering in the West Bank to ease tensions between settlers and Palestinians

- Site of the attack in Israel
- Native name: הטבח בחולית
- Location: 31°13′48″N 34°19′36″E; Holit, Southern District, Israel
- Date: 7 October 2023; 3 years ago
- Attack type: Mass shooting, mass murder, war crime
- Deaths: 13 Israelis; 3 foreign workers 20 attackers
- Injuries: 8 (recovered)
- Victim: Hostages: 9
- Perpetrator: Hamas (Al-Qassam Brigades)

On 7 October 2023, the Hamas Izz ad-Din al-Qassam Brigades (Al-Qassam Brigades) attacked Holit, a kibbutz close to the border fence with the Gaza Strip, as part of a surprise attack on Israel.

Sixteen people were killed in the attack, including three foreign workers as well as three members of the security forces. About 20 of the attacking militants were also killed.

Nine hostages were taken during the attack. Three were released on the day of the attack after entering Gaza and made it back to Israel that same day. An additional two were released during the Israeli–Palestinian prisoner exchange. The bodies of two others were recovered on 8 January 2025.

== Background ==
The kibbutz was established in 1977 in the Sinai and was transferred to the Negev as part of the 1982 Egypt–Israel peace treaty. In 2024 it had a population of 223 in 53 families.

== Attack ==
At 6:30 on the morning of 7 October, 20 militants from Hamas' Al-Qassam Brigades invaded Israel and approached the kibbutz. According to the IDF investigation, about 60 militants participated in the attack on the kibbutz. There was evidence that many residents were still asleep or eating breakfast when the attack began.

At 6:45 a.m., the first militants were identified just outside Holit by the kibbutz security coordinator, Avi Korin, and his deputy. Ten minutes later, IDF soldiers monitoring surveillance cameras spotted an estimated 15 militants near the kibbutz and dispatched forces. Two patrol vehicles carrying soldiers and an armored vehicle were dispatched. The patrol vehicles arrived at the entrance to the kibbutz in two minutes but could not enter it as the gate would not open, while the armored vehicle got stuck while leaving its base and was caught up in fighting. At 6:59 a.m., the militants blasted a hole in the community's eastern perimeter fence and entered Holit, beginning a murder, destruction, and looting spree.

At around 7:10 a.m., kibbutz security chief Avi Korin was killed while fighting the militants. His deputy continued to fight as further waves of militants entered the kibbutz. At 7:18 a.m., the two patrol vehicles arrived at the hole in the perimeter fence and came under fire. The vehicles rammed several motorcycle-riding militants before leaving to fight in another area after the soldiers receiving reports that their commander had been wounded there..

Over the following hours, militants breached dozens of homes, killed and abducted residents, and set fires. The Hamas militants went from house to house shooting at the metal shutters of safe rooms to determine from noise from within whether they were occupied. They then attempted to breach occupied safe rooms using grenades and shooting. When they were able to breach the safe rooms they killed the occupants. In several cases they returned to houses and set them alight to force any occupants to exit. ZAKA volunteers reported that grenades had been thrown into houses, people shot, and vehicles blown up as residents tried to flee.

Rotem Mathias described his mother hiding him under a blanket and lying on top of him to protect him as they heard militants outside. He heard the militants break in with grenades and kill his parents.

Before entering their safe room Anat Dymshits and her father saw neighbors’ houses being lit on fire. Anat managed, together with three other residents, to save one neighbour from her burning house by pulling her out of a window. Anat then returned safely to her house. At the same time, her parents managed to dampen the area so the fires did not spread. Dymshits and her father, Yosef Rozhansky (67), were hiding in her safe room with her mother, grandmother, her four children and their dog. They describe how militants tried to breach the room by throwing a grenade at the door. Although this was unsuccessful at gaining entry, shrapnel from the grenade went under the door injuring the three elderly adults — Rozhansky lost his leg — and one of her daughters.

Avital Aladjem was hiding in her house with her neighbor Hayim Katsman. When militants broke into her house and shot them, Katsman protected her with his body and was killed. She was unharmed and taken captive.

Yuval Rabivo heard that militants wanted to kill men first so he went and stood outside hoping they would kill him but leave his wife, Ilan, and his children alone. He was not attacked. Husband and wife Nir and Adam and their children survived because Adam was able to hold the door shut against militants trying to gain entry.

Shir Azoulai, another resident whose safe room was not breached, had her house was ransacked twice. She managed to save a neighbour who had already succumbed to smoke fumes in the neighbour's safe room. Naama and Gideon Kovani sheltering in their safe room heard that their next door neighbour had been killed and her daughter was hiding in a closet. Naama encouraged Gideon to save the child, which he managed to do without incident.

Withawat Kunwong, a Thai employee of the kibbutz reported being attacked in his hiding place by what he described as a Palestinian wearing civilian clothes and wielding a knife. He fought the person but was left for dead with severe throat wounds. Fellow employees found him and looked after him. He credits his survival to the bluntness of the knife which left him with jagged scars. He returned to his wife and children in Thailand once he recovered.

According to the IDF investigation, between 7 and 8 a.m. militants abducted six hostages at the kibbutz cowshed, consisting of four Bedouin Israelis from the Ziyadne family and two foreign workers, and killed another.

Amid the massacre, armed residents resisted the attack. Shimon Azoulai, a resident, had a weapon and fought militants "where he could", but he said he did not have much impact. He survived the attack. In one incident, after militants broke into a home at 7:20 a.m. and murdered a couple as their 7 year old daughter hid in a closet, an armed neighbor rescued the girl three hours later while shooting two militants. At 7:30 a.m., a militant who broke into a home was killed by an armed resident. An hour later, militants placed an explosive charge on the window of the house's safe room, severely wounding his daughter and lightly wounding his wife. Kibbutz resident Adi Vital-Kaploun called her husband, who was not at home, asking for instructions on how to use his M16 rifle. After a militant broke into her home at 12:30 p.m., she shot him dead using the rifle. Shortly afterward, other militants entered her home and killed her in front of her children, remaining in the house with the children until around 2:00 p.m. At around 12:55 p.m., an Israeli Air Force attack helicopter arrived and scanned the kibbutz for about half an hour, firing several shells to try to locate militants, but failing to do so. At about the same time, militants made several attempts to enter the home of the deputy security coordinator, who killed at least one and wounded another.

Michael Raitzin, a resident of the kibbutz, and the head of the criminal investigation unit of the police in the largest Bedouin city in Israel, Rahat, which is close to the kibbutz, was on leave on the day of the attack, but heard from his colleagues at around 7:30 a.m. that an incursion had occurred, although at that time he did not realise the scale. Armed with his service pistol, he prepared to go and assist in Rahat. However, when he got to his vehicle he observed 20 heavily armed militants. Realizing he could not fight them with his handgun, he fired random shots to distract them, and managed to return to his house via an indirect route. He spent the rest of the day at the window of his house intending to protect his wife and children if necessary. His house was not attacked.

At 1:53 p.m., Israeli troops arrived at the kibbutz and began fighting to clear it. At 2:00 p.m., two soldiers were wounded while battling militants holed up in a house. At 2:06 p.m., additional forces arrived including a tank operated by an all-female crew, which knocked down the entrance gate, enabling the troops to enter. At 2:10 p.m., an Israeli soldier was killed in the fighting. From 2:30 to 3:30 p.m., with the arrival of the IDF, the militants began retreating. They took Avital Aladjem and the Vital-Kaploun children with them to Gaza as they left. Alajdem was subsequently left alone with the two children in Gaza for unknown reasons. She then walked them back to the kibbutz, passing retreating militants along the way. Meanwhile, additional Israeli forces arrived, searched the area, and engaged retreating militants. At 3:55 p.m., commandos of the Shaldag Unit identified a group of retreating militants, fired on them, and directed the tank to the area, which subsequently ran over several of the militants. The female tank crew took fire from two groups of militants, who were either killed or chased away, during the fighting. Starting at 4:30 p.m., residents were evacuated from the community as soldiers continued to scan the area for militants.

Damiel Kukushkin, who had been sheltering in his safe room the whole day, was only released from his house at 7:30 p.m. as the troops cleared houses one at a time. As a former paramedic, he helped the IDF identify bodies. He reported seeing "mountains" of Hamas militants’ corpses.

On the following day, at around 10:15 a.m., soldiers encountered several militants in orchards east of the kibbutz and engaged them. The militants were killed and three soldiers were wounded in the subsequent exchange of fire. On 9 October, soldiers found and killed additional militants in the orchards.

== Casualties and hostages ==
Sixteen people were killed in the attack. The community's oldest member, Moshe Ridler, a 91 year-old Holocaust survivor and retired police detective, was among those killed. Three members of the security forces were killed: the kibbutz security coordinator, another member of the kibbutz security team, and a reservist soldier. Among the dead were Israelis with dual nationality from the United States, Canada and Argentina were killed. Three foreign workers were killed during the attack: a Moldovan employee who was Ridler's caregiver and two Nepali workers.

At least eight members of the kibbutz or their visiting families were injured. They all recovered.

According to the IDF investigation of the attack, about 20 Palestinian militants were killed in the fighting during the attack.

=== Families in the kibbutz ===
==== Ridler / Busko ====
Moshe Ridler and his Moldovan carer, Petro Busko, were killed during the attack. Ridler was born in Romania in 1931, and was sent to a concentration camp in Eastern Europe in 1941, when he was 9. He managed to escape when he was 11 and eventually made his way to Israel. His mother and sister did not survive the Holocaust.

==== Mathias Family ====
Shachar Mathias (English name Deborah, but she went by her Hebrew name), a dual American-Israeli citizen, and her husband Shlomi Mathias were peace activists living in Holit with their 16-year-old son Rotem. Their 19 and 21-year old daughters also lived separately in the Kibbutz. Her father, Ilan Troen, is professor emeritus of Israel Studies at Brandeis University, and at Bar-Ilan University of the Negev. They were talking on the phone on the morning of the attack when she said she heard gunshots, breaking glass and Arabic being spoken, after which the conversation was cut. The next Troen and the family heard was a message from Rotem on the family text group saying: "Mom and Dad are dead. I'm sorry. Please send help." Although he was shot in the stomach help did not arrive for another 13 hours.

He said the noise his mother heard were militants breaking into the house. His mother ordered him to lie under some thick blanketing and then lay over him shielding his body with hers. As the militants broke into their safe room Rotem heard two explosions which he thought were grenades. He then heard shots, and his father screaming as he died. He felt his mother's body twitch on top of him and then she was still. Her body protected him from most of the bullets except for one which entered his stomach, but was not fatal, since her body absorbed the bullet's impact.

Through the family text channel various family members, including a doctor and a trauma specialist, coaxed Rotem through his ordeal. They encouraged him, made him slow his breathing and when the militants returned to burn the house, told him not to go outside. They eventually led the IDF rescuers to him. He was taken to hospital, operated on, and eventually recovered from the injury. He asked to keep the bullet in memory of his parents. He is receiving trauma therapy, and said initially wanted to commit suicide, but decided against this because it would not honor his parents' sacrifice for him.

==== Kaploun-Vital / Katsman / Aladjem ====
The experiences during the attack of Adi Kaploun-Vital and her two sons, Hayim Katsman and Avinat Aledjem are connected. They were all residents of the kibbutz on the day of the attack, but the three families are not related. Katzman is credited with saving three neighbors. He died using his body to protect Aladjem from militant bullets. Aladjem subsequently saved the two Kaploun-Vital children from being kept hostage which lead to them being reunited with their father. Their mother was killed during the attack.

After the attack began Kaploun-Vital hid in her house with her sons. At around 12:30, she messaged her husband, who had stayed overnight at another kibbutz, not to return home, which probably saved his life. Militants broke into her house and killed her. They booby-trapped her body and hid it under a bed, so if anyone pulled the body out it would have exploded. Since it took a while for the IDF to clear houses and disarm traps like these, Kaploun-Vital was initially considered missing rather than killed, until her body was found. The militants took the children hostage. At some point the oldest child (4-years old) was shot in the leg. The baby (4.5-months old) was later treated for breathing problems.

Screenshot: Avital Aladjem (center) just after militants decide to release her and the two sons of her neighbour, Adi Vital-Kaploun, who was killed earlier. Aladjem is carrying the 4.5-month old son under her dress.

They next broke into the home of Aladjem, where she was hiding with Katsman. They shot them, killing Katsman, but his body shielded Aladjem from harm. They took her hostage with the Kaploun-Vitil children. She and the children were marched through the kibbutz towards Gaza with one of the militants carrying the older child because of his injury. She reports that they saw scenes of death and destruction, with shots being fired and houses being burnt.

Just before the Gaza border (Aladjem reports being able to see Gazan houses), the older child began screaming that he did not want to go. The militant eventually put the boy down and told them to go. In a video released by Hamas of this moment, Aladjem, who is holding the baby under her dress, is seen walking towards the boy (see screenshot). She bends down and hugs him, and they start walking hand-in-hand in a different direction from which the militants walk. Aladjem describes avoiding other militant groups by hiding behind sand dunes, and eventually meeting IDF soldiers who escorted them back to the kibbutz in time to be evacuated with the other survivors. The boys were later reunited with their father.

There was controversy related to the video. Hamas characterized it as them showing mercy by releasing a mother and her children a couple of days after the attack. It was subsequently confirmed by Aladjem that the video showed her and Kaploun-Vital's two sons, being released on the day of the attack, with Kaploun-Vital already having been killed by this point.

==== Ziyadne family ====
Youssef Ziyadne was a Bedouin from Rahat. He and his two sons, Hamza and Bilal worked in the cowshed of the kibbutz. His daughter, Aisha, was visiting them on the morning of the attack to have a picnic. After the attack they were missing but it wasn't certain if they had been taken captive or killed.

During the hostage release negotiations it became apparent that the family had been taken captive to Gaza. Bilal, the younger son, and his sister, Aisha, were released as part of the Israeli–Palestinian prisoner exchange. Their father and brother were still held captive; their bodies were recovered from Gaza on 8 January 2025. Yousef had high blood pressure and was a diabetic, requiring injections. Bilal said that although he told their captors that the family was Arab, he was told that they were still being taken captive. He said the family were provided with enough food to not go hungry, and were each given a mattress, blanket and pillow for sleeping. He reported being afraid of the Israeli airstrikes he heard, but not of Hamas. He was concerned for the remaining hostages because he knew what they were experiencing.

=== Hamas video of children being shown compassion ===
Screenshot: Militant holding Israeli children during the attack.

Hamas released a video on its Telegram channel on 8 October 2023 allegedly taken on 7 October 2023 during the Holit attack. The video shows a toddler and baby who are purported to be Israeli children, being interacted with in a friendly way by Hamas militants. The toddler is seen in conversation with a militant who has his arm around the child's shoulder. He is subsequently seen drinking after being instructed to say "Bismilla" (in the name of God) before the drink. The baby is seen held by a militant and then pushed backwards and forwards in a pram. The message of the video is given between these scenes by another militant while holding the toddler and baby (see screenshot). The militant loudly in Arabic says: "Look how merciful our hearts are. We aren't killing children like you are."

The IDF responded to the video by retweeting it on its X channel with the wording: "You can see their injuries, hear their cries and feel them trembling from fear as these children are held hostage in their own homes by Hamas terrorists and their parents lie there dead in the next room. These are the terrorists that we are going to defeat."

The video has not been directly verified by any media outlet. The IDF response seems to indicate it is a video of Israeli children, on the day of the attack, with their dead parents nearby. Their response does not indicate or dispute the venue. There has been no further news of the welfare of the children or their parents after the release of the video.

=== Details of casualties and hostages unfolding over time ===
Groups of people highlighted by colour, have linked stories covered above.

| Name | Age | Gender | Description | 7 October 2023 | As of 8 January 2024 |
|---|---|---|---|---|---|
| Abraham Gabriel Korin | 56 | Male | Argentinian-Israeli, security team member | ~~Missing~~ | Killed, 7 October 2023 |
| Liz Elharar | 46 | Female | | Killed | - |
| Meir Elharar | 58 | Male | | Killed | - |
| Lily Keizman | | Female | | Killed | - |
| Tehila Katabi | 31 | Female | | Killed | - |
| Rolan Sultan | 68 | Male | | Killed | - |
| Ronit Sultan | 56 | Female | Argentinian-Israeli | Killed | - |
| Moshe Ridler | 91 | Male | Holocaust survivor | Killed | - |
| Petro Bosco | 35 | Male | Moldovan employee, Moshe Ridler's carer | Killed | - |
| Two unnamed foreigners | | | Nepali employees | Killed | - |
| Withawat Kunwong | 30 | Male | Thai employee | Injured | Recovered, returned to Thailand |
| Deborah "Shahar" Mathias | 50 | Female | American-Israeli | Killed | - |
| Shlomi Mathias | 49 | Male | | Killed | - |
| Rotem Mathias | 16 | Male | Mathias’ youngest son | Injured | Recovered |
| Adi Kaploun-Vital | 33 | Female | Canadian-Israeli, mother of two sons, Katsman and Aladjem's neighbour | ~~Missing~~ | Killed, 7 October 2023 |
| Hayim Yeshurun Katsman | 32 | Male | American-Israeli, Aledjem and Kaploun-Vital's neighbour | Killed | - |
| Avital Aladjem | | Female | Katsman and Kaploun-Vital's neighbour | Captured, Older Kaploun-Vital son shot in leg, Baby son later needed treatment for breathing difficulties | Released at Gaza border, 7 October 2023, recovered |
| 2 Kaploun-Vital sons | 4 yrs, 4.5 month | Male | | Captured, Older Kaploun-Vital son shot in leg, Baby son later needed treatment for breathing difficulties | Released at Gaza border, 7 October 2023, recovered |
| Yousef Hamis Ziyadne (father) | 53 | Male | Bedouin family employees | Captured | Deceased; bodies recovered on 8 January 2025 |
| Hamza Ziyadne (older son) | 22 | Male | Bedouin family employees | Captured | Deceased; bodies recovered on 8 January 2025 |
| Bilal Ziyadne (younger son) | 18 | Male | Bedouin family employees | Captured | Released, 30 November 2023 |
| Aisha Ziyadne (daughter) | 16 | Female | Bedouin family employees | Captured | Released, 30 November 2023 |
| Yosef Rozhansky (father) | 67 | Male | Family members of resident Anat Dymshitz | Injured | Recovered, father lost his leg |
| Alla Rozhansky (mother) | | Female | Family members of resident Anat Dymshitz | Injured | Recovered, father lost his leg |
| Yulia Fainstein (grandmother) | | Female | Family members of resident Anat Dymshitz | Injured | Recovered, father lost his leg |
| Ofek Dymshitz (daughter) | | Female | Family members of resident Anat Dymshitz | Injured | Recovered, father lost his leg |
| 'Israeli' toddler and baby filmed 'during Holit attack' | Very young | 1 boy, 1 unknown | In Hamas video allegedly filmed in Holit | Seen being cared for by militants on video | No details known other than unverified video itself |
| Hamas militants (20) | - | - | | Killed or chased away | ? |

== Aftermath ==
=== Survivors evacuated ===
Survivors were initially evacuated to Kibbutz Gvulot, which while still being situated in the north-western Negev desert, is much further inland and was not attacked. They were then moved to Kibbutz Ein Gedi, near the Dead Sea, which had housed Holit refugees after earlier trouble on the Gaza border.

Michael Raitzen didn't relocate to Ein Gedi as he had to report for work in Rahat the next day at 8:00. The chief of police had been killed, and Raitzen's deputy had been injured. It took the police several days to clear Rahat of militants.

=== Treatment of children's trauma ===
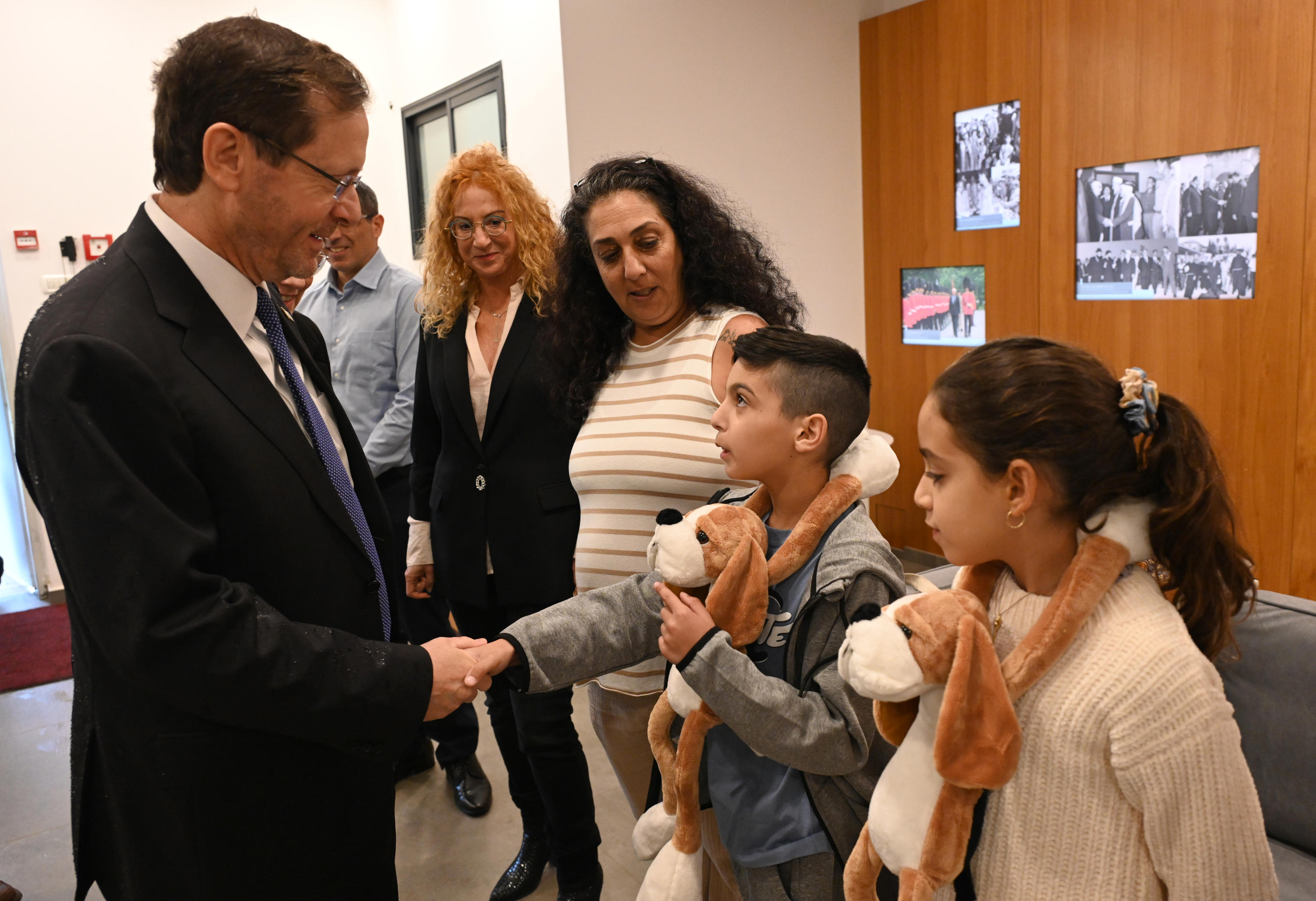
President Isaac Hertzhog, visiting children from Kibbutz Holit, now living at Kibbutz Ein Gedi, where they are being treated for trauma

Children from the kibbutz, who were evacuated to Kibbutz Ein Gedi, participated in "hug" therapy to help them deal with their trauma. The therapy developed by Dr. Shai Hen-Gal uses a stuffed dog doll to assist in the children's treatment. President Isaac Herzog and his wife, were introduced to the children on a 20 November 2023 visit. The therapy method was explained to them, and mothers and children discussed how the method helped the children deal with the trauma they suffered during the 7 October attacks.

== Reactions ==
The residents have mixed feeling about returning to the kibbutz when they are able to. Children in particular have expressed fear of doing so. Many have expressed the desire to remain at the kibbutzim to which they were evacuated, which are not close to Gaza.

Several resident volunteers have returned to the kibbutz to look after the farm animals and other essential functions. This includes Olga Chagin, Daniel Kukushkin's mother, who spends two 5-hour sessions working in the barn. She considers herself to be back home. Rotem Mathias has said that he will return to work on the kibbutz when he is 18 to honor his parents’ memory.

=== Calls for a cease fire and peace talks ===
Residents are generally supportive of the continuation of the Gaza war. However, one family, that of Hayim Katsman who was killed during the attack, have been outspoken in calling for an immediate cease fire, humanitarian aid for Gaza, and talks to find a diplomatic solution. Katsman was an academic researching in the field of radicalisation of religious Zionist communities. He had just received his PhD from the University of Washington with a dissertation dedicated to "all life forms that exist between the Jordan River and the Mediterranean Sea." [emphasis added]. He was a peace activist who was described as:

- A teacher, advocate, and trusted friend to the Palestinian farming communities of the South Hebron hills,
- Volunteering to defuse tensions between Palestinians and Jewish settlers before they escalated to violence,
- Volunteering in the gardens of Rahat, a Bedouin town,
- Volunteering at Academia for Equality, supporting Palestinian academics in Israel,
- One of the few ex-IDF soldiers who publicly testified for Breaking the Silence, which is vilified by the government for its human rights work, and
- A DJ of Arabic music.

Katsman's sibling, Noy, who is also a peace activist, said their brother would not want his death to be used to justify retribution against Palestinians. They said: "I don't want anything to happen to people in Gaza like it happened to my brother — and I'm sure he wouldn't want that either." Their mother agreed that Katsman “wouldn't want innocent people to be killed." During Katzman's funeral Noy eulogised their brother as "...even in the face of Hamas people that murdered him...[he would] still speak out against the killing and violence of innocent people." Noy also wrote an opinion piece for The Nation with the title "My Brother Was Slaughtered on October 7. I Know He Would Be Calling for a Cease-Fire", expressing similar sentiments, and saying that their brother would not be able to "stomach the moral stain" of innocent people dying to avenge his death.

=== Calls for retribution ===
The Canadian-based family of Adi Vital-Kaploun were horrified by how she died and her sons were treated. The spokesperson said they did not want the Israeli government to negotiate with the militants but rather to punish them. He compared the attack to the September 11 attacks and said: "The retaliation we're expecting is literally the annihilation of the entire strip."

Shachar and Shlomi Mathias were also peace activists. They helped create a duel medium Hebrew-Arabic school which they sent their children to because they felt that dialogue was the best way to reach a peaceful solution. However, their family have made statements supportive of retribution. Her father Professor Ilan Troen described his daughter and son in law as "idealists" and said that "This is a family that was committed to peace."

Shachar's brother likened the killing of his sister to that of their great-grandmother who also defended her child, their grandmother, by hiding her under a bed and protecting her with her body in 1909 in what is now the Ukraine. He cannot reconcile the manner of his sister and brother-in-law's death with the way they always stood for reconciliation with their Arab neighbours. He compared the attacks to a pogrom and said that "We don't want anyone else harmed, but God you have to defend yourself. You can't let this go."

== See also ==
- Gaza war
- Outline of the Gaza war
- List of massacres during the 2023 Israel–Hamas war
- Palestinian political violence
- Moshe Dayan's eulogy for Ro'i Rothberg
- List of massacres in Israel
