= Hayim Katsman =

Israeli-American peace activist (1991–2023)

- חיים כצמן
- Born: 3 October 1991; Israel
- Died: 7 October 2023 (aged 32); Holit, Israel
- Cause of death: Holit massacre
- Education: Open University; Ben-Gurion University of the Negev; University of Washington

Hayim Yeshurun Katsman (Hebrew: חיים ישורון כצמן; 3 October 1991 – 7 October 2023) was an American-Israeli peace activist and academic. He was murdered in the Holit massacre in Israel, on 7 October 2023.

== Life ==
Katsman was born in Israel on 3 October 1991, one of six children born to Daniel and Hannah Katsman. His parents immigrated to Israel from New York City in 1990. His mother was originally from Cincinnati, and his father was from Seattle. His maternal grandparents were both Holocaust survivors. He grew up in Petah Tikva in a religious Zionist household. Katsman was an avid reader from a young age. As a teenager he read works by Richard Dawkins, which significantly influenced his decision to stop being religiously observant. At 16, he was expelled from the religious high school he attended after refusing to stop openly criticizing religion despite a request from the school administration. He was sent to attend an external high school program and at age 17 began studying philosophy at the Open University of Israel. He had to pause his studies to do mandatory military service in the Israel Defense Forces. Katsman was drafted into the IDF in 2009 and served in the Combat Intelligence Collection Array of the Border Defense Corps. He served in the West Bank and participated in a number of dangerous missions.

After completing his military service, Katsman moved to kibbutz Holit out of a desire to "revive" the community. He initially worked as a car mechanic, before becoming a gardener for the kibbutz. He later opened a bar there. He was also a DJ who played a wide range of Arabic music. He deejayed at friend's parties and various events under the stage name "Dr. 3abass".

Katsman resumed his philosophy studies at the Open University of Israel following his discharge from the IDF. After discovering that the university did not offer a standalone philosophy degree and that he would need to pursue a double major, he chose political science as his second major. During his studies he developed a passion for political science and decided to pursue further academic studies in the subject. He subsequently earned a master's degree in political science from Ben-Gurion University of the Negev, where he led the adjunct professors' union. He then moved to Seattle to pursue a PhD in international studies from the University of Washington. While in Seattle, he taught Hebrew at a synagogue and was a co-coordinator of the university's Israel-Palestine research group. Katsman returned to Holit after the onset of the COVID-19 pandemic. He completed his degree remotely, winning the Baruch Kimmerling prize (given by the Association for Israel Studies) for best graduate paper in 2020 and graduating in 2021. His dissertation focused on religious Zionism in Israel.

Katsman was opposed to the Israeli occupation of the West Bank, and refused to visit Israeli settlements there. He was involved in several activist groups, including Machsom Watch and a group that organized "protective presence" shifts for Palestinian communities in the Hebron Hills. He testified for Breaking the Silence, volunteered to transport Palestinians from Gaza to medical appointments in Israel, and was also involved with volunteer work in Rahat. He was fluent in Arabic.

Katsman was working as a lecturer on philosophy, politics, and Israeli society at Hadassah Academic College at the time of his death. His academic research focused on religious Zionist communities. He had concluded a three-month trip to India a week prior to the October 7 attack. On the evening before the attack, he deejayed at a farewell party close to the Nova music festival.

== Death ==
Katsman was in Holit when it was attacked by Hamas militants on 7 October 2023 and attempted to assist his neighbors. He initially ran to the home of his neighbor Tehila Katabi and found that she had been killed. He then ran to the home of his other neighbor, Avital Aladjem and hid in the closet with her, shielding her with his body. Katsman was shot dead after Hamas fighters entered the house, but Aladjem survived. She was then kidnapped to Gaza by Hamas militants along with two children from the kibbutz, a four-month old baby and a four-year old child. They were abandoned by their kidnappers and Aladjem was able to take the children back to Holit.

Katsman was 32 years old at the time of his death. As he had been a member of the kibbutz security team, the Israel Defense Forces retroactively recognized Katsmsn as a fallen soldier with the rank of Master Sergeant. He was buried on 12 October in Petah Tikva, at the Yarkon Cemetery.

== See also ==
- Casualties of the 2023 Israel–Hamas war
