= American Jewish Year Book =

American academic journal

- Cover of the 2023 issue
- Discipline: Jewish history
- Language: English

Publication details
- History: Since 1899
- Publisher: Springer (since 2012) (United States)
- Frequency: Yearly

Standard abbreviations
- ISO 4: Am. Jew. Year B.

Indexing
- ISSN: 0065-8987 (print); 2213-9583 (web)
- LCCN: 99004040
- JSTOR: amerjewiyearbook
- OCLC no.: 1480116

The American Jewish Year Book (AJYB) is an American academic journal published since 1899. Publication was initiated by the Jewish Publication Society (JPS). In 1908, the American Jewish Committee (AJC) assumed responsibility for compilation and editing while JPS remained the publisher.

From 1950 through 1993, the two organizations were co-publishers, and from 1994 to 2008 AJC became the sole publisher. From 2012 to the present, Springer has published the Year Book as an academic publication.

== History ==
From 1899 to 1907, the American Jewish Year Book (AJYR) was published annually by the Jewish Publication Society (JPS). In 1907, the new American Jewish Committee began to publish the AJYR in partnership with the JPS. From 1950 through 1993, the two organizations were co-publishers, and from 1994 to 2008 AJC became the sole publisher. By the 1940s, the 200-age volume constituted the largest annual report of Jewish affairs around the world and including content from experts on Jewish communal life.

Previous editors included: Cyrus Adler, Maurice Basseches, Herman Bernstein, Morris Fine, Herbert Friedenwald, H.G. Friedman, Lawrence Grossman, Milton Himmelfarb, Joseph Jacobs, Martha Jelenko, Julius B. Maller, Samson D. Oppenheim, Harry Schneiderman, Ruth R. Seldin, David Singer, Jacob Sloan, Maurice Spector, and Henrietta Szold.

Publication of the American Jewish Year Book by the AJC ceased with the 2008 volume, a victim of both the economic slowdown of 2008 and changes in the publishing industry. The American Jewish Year Book started publishing again in 2012, in both hard copy and on the Internet, as a Springer book series. The book is published in cooperation with the Berman Jewish DataBank and the Association for the Social Scientific Study of Jewry.

Monetary and institutional support are being provided by the Miller Center for Contemporary Judaic Studies at the University of Miami, the College of Liberal Arts and Sciences at the University of Connecticut, the College of Arts and Sciences at the University of Miami, the Center for Judaic Studies and Contemporary Jewish Life at the University of Connecticut, and the Mandell L. "Bill" and Madeleine Berman Foundation. The new Year Book is edited by Arnold Dashefsky of the University of Connecticut and Ira Sheskin of the University of Miami.

== Influence ==
According to historians Jonathan Sarna and Jonathan J. Golden, the AJYR is the "Annual Record of American Jewish Civilization" and a major resource for academic researchers, researchers and practitioners at Jewish institutions, the media (both Jewish and secular), educated leaders and lay persons, and libraries. For decades, the American Jewish Year Book has been an important place for leading academics to publish long review chapters on topics of interest to the North American Jewish community.
