= Racie Adler =

Racie (Friedenwald) Adler (August 5, 1872 - March 20, 1952) was a Jewish community leader in Philadelphia and a major officer of Philadelphia Red Cross during and after World War I.

== Early life ==
Adler was born to Moses and Jane (Alborn) Friedenwald of Baltimore. Her grandfather was German immigrant Jonas Friedenwald, her uncle was prominent physician Aaron Friedenwald, and her brother was librarian and historian Herbert Friedenwald.

Adler was educated at Goucher College.

In September 1905, when Adler was 33, she married Cyrus Adler, then 42. They corresponded frequently, and through these letters it is proved that Adler assisted her husband in his work, including proofreading his manuscripts and accompanying him on travels to Egypt, Palestine, and throughout Europe.

Adler and Cyrus had one daughter, Sarah.

== Career ==
In conjunction with the Jewish Welfare Board, during World War I, Adler served in many roles. She was the Chairman of the North Philadelphia Liberty Loan Drive Committee to help fund war efforts. Under her leadership, her committee raised millions of dollars for the war. She was also a supervisor of the North Philadelphia workrooms for the American Red Cross knitting clothing and surgical dressings for the American armed forces in World War I. Her work also included repair of soldiers' clothing as well as appeals for donations and funds for equipment. She held this post until 1918.

In 1918, Adler was one of the founding members and directors of the Women's League of the United Synagogue of America.

She was also President of the Hebrew Sunday School Society.

In 1924, Adler was the original chair of the weekly radio Jewish educational program on New York's WEAF-WIN station. The show focused on ritual instructions, Jewish and classical music, poetry, and lectures.

Adler was a founder of the Jewish Students' Houses (now "Hillel") at University of Pennsylvania and Temple University.

In 1944, Adler was part of the founding leaders of the American Jewish Committee chapter in Philadelphia.

In 1949 she was awarded a plaque from the Armed Services Committee of the Jewish Welfare Board for completion of 25 years of service.

== End of Life ==
Adler died at age 79 after suffering from an illness.
