= Solomon Zeitlin =

American historian of Judaism (d. 1976)

- שְׁניאור זלמן צײטלין
- Born: May 28, 1886 or May 31, 1892; Chashniki, Russian Empire (present-day Belarus)
- Died: December 28, 1976 (aged 90) or December 28, 1976 (aged 84); Philadelphia, Pennsylvania, U.S.
- Occupations: Jewish historian, Talmudic scholar

Solomon Zeitlin (Note: Hebrew: שְׁניאור זלמן צײטלין, romanized: Sheneʼor Zalman Tsaiṭelin; Russian: Шломо Цейтлин, romanized: Shlomo Tseytlin, sometimes given as Cejtlin) (28 May 1886 or 31 May 1892 – 28 December 1976) was an American Jewish historian, Talmudic scholar and in his time the world's leading authority on the Second Commonwealth, also known as the Second Temple period. His work The Rise and Fall of the Judean State is about the Second Temple period.

== Biography ==
=== Russia ===
Born in Chashniki, Russia, he attended the Gymnasium and later the Academy of Baron Günzburg. There he met and formed a lifelong friendship with Zalman Shazar. In 1904, while in Russia, he obtained Semikhah.

=== Paris and USA ===
In Paris in 1916 he was awarded a Th.D. from the École Rabbinique and an Élève Titulaire de la Section des Sciences Religeuses from the University of Paris. In 1915 he emigrated to America. He received his doctorate in 1917 and became professor of Rabbinics.

Zeitlin taught at Yeshiva College in New York for two years before going to Dropsie College in Philadelphia, where he served as a Fellow in Rabbinics. He edited the academic journal, the Jewish Quarterly Review (JQR)(1940–1976). With A.A. Neuman he co-edited volumes 31–57, and continued as sole editor until his death in 1976. He controversially devoted considerable page-space of the JQR between 1949 and 1964 to engage in scholarly claim and counterclaim over the authenticity and pre-Christian origin of the Dead Sea Scrolls. Publishing some two dozen articles on the subject, he remained convinced of their late date. In the JQR July 1961 edition he published an article "Jewish Rights in Palestine" by British philosopher and historian Arnold J. Toynbee and his own response "Jewish Rights in Eretz Israel (Palestine)" where he rebukes Toynbee for lack of scholarship. In addition to history he taught Talmud, wrote more than 400 articles and books and was instrumental in organizing the American Academy of Jewish Research.

=== Private life ===
He never married and had no immediate survivors.

== Works ==
- "An Historical Study of the Canonization of the Hebrew Scripture", American Academy for Jewish Research, Vol.3, 1931–1932.
- Who Crucified Jesus?, New York: Harper & Brothers, Publishers, 1942, 1947.
- "The Hoax of the 'Slavonic Josephus'". The Jewish Quarterly Review, New Series. 39/2 (October 1948): 172–177.
- Maimonides – A Biography, New York: Bloch Publishing Company, 1955.
- The Rise and Fall of the Judean State: A Political, Social and Religious History of the Second Commonwealth. New York: Jewish Publication Society of America, 1967.
- The Book of Judith: Greek text / with an English translation, commentary and critical notes by Morton S. Enslin; edited with a general introduction and appendices by Solomon Zeitlin.
- "The Origin of the Synagogue", American Academy for Jewish Research, Vol.2, 1930–1931.
- "The Tobias Family and the Hasmoneans", American Academy for Jewish Research, Vol.4, 1932–1933.
- Studies in the Early History of Judaism, (four volumes), KTAV Publication House, 1978.
