= Dropsie College for Hebrew and Cognate Learning =

America's first degree-granting institution for post-doctoral Jewish studies

- Dropsie University Complex
- U.S. National Register of Historic Places
- U.S. Historic district
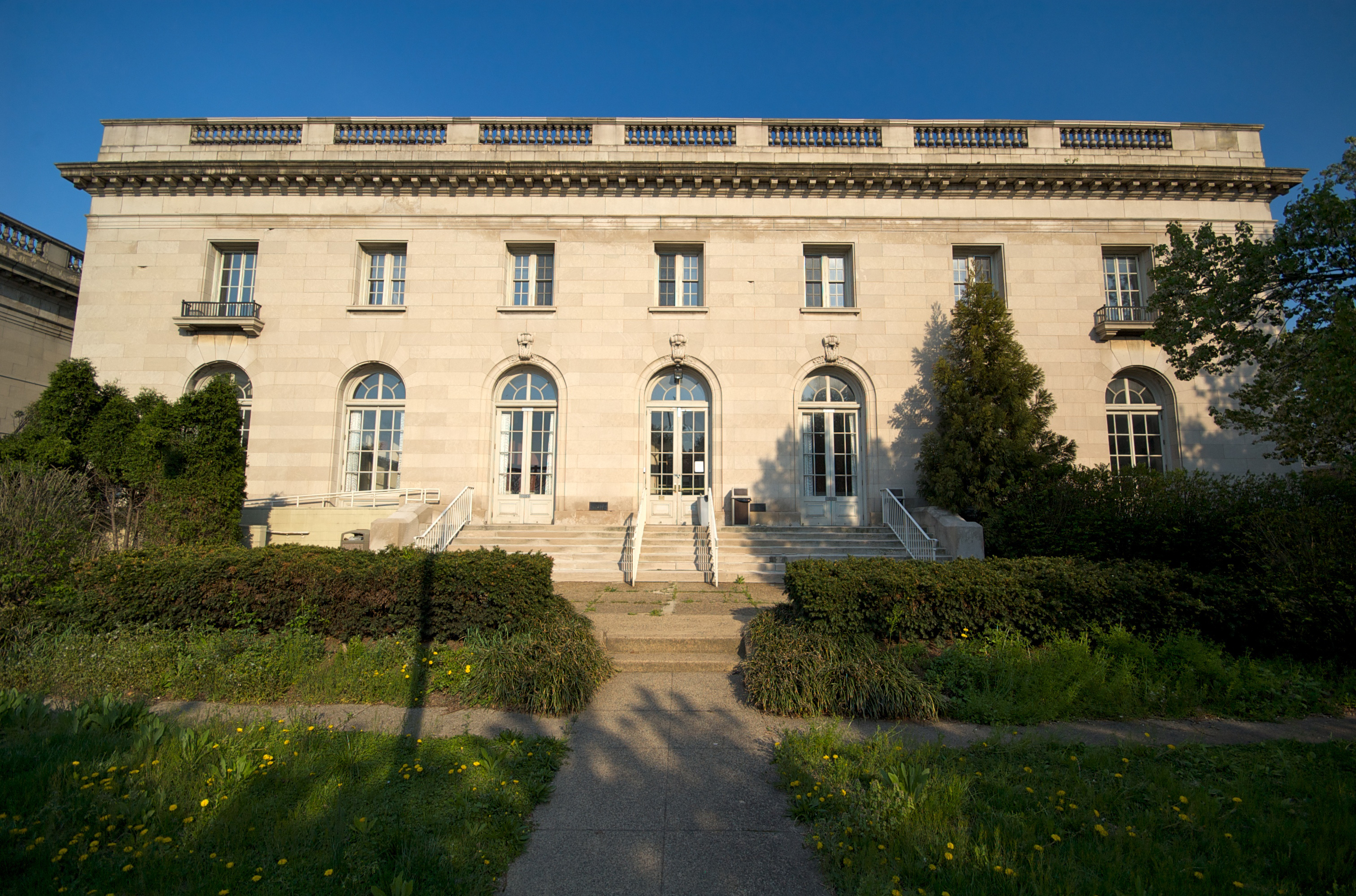
- Dropsie University Complex

- Location within Philadelphia Location within Pennsylvania Location within the United States
- Location: 2321–2335 N Broad St., Broad and York Streets; Philadelphia, Pennsylvania
- Coordinates: 39°59′20″N 75°09′18″W
- Area: 2 acres (0.81 ha)
- Built: 1909
- Architectural style: Beaux Arts, Renaissance
- NRHP reference No.: 75001661
- Added to NRHP: January 17, 1975

Dropsie College for Hebrew and Cognate Learning or Dropsie University was a Jewish institution of higher learning in Philadelphia, Pennsylvania. It was America's first degree-granting institution for post-doctoral Jewish studies. Funded by the will of Moses Aaron Dropsie (1821–1905), it was chartered in 1907 and its first building was completed in 1912. It ceased to grant degrees in 1986.

The Dropsie University Complex's buildings were placed on Philadelphia's roster of historic buildings as of November 30, 1971. The Dropsie University Complex was named a national historic landmark (NRHP) on January 17, 1975.

After a brief period as the Annenberg Research Institute (1986–1993), Dropsie ceased to be an independent organization and became part of the University of Pennsylvania. Its name changed several times and it was relocated, becoming the Katz Center for Advanced Judaic Studies.

== History ==
Dropsie College for Hebrew and Cognate Learning was founded in 1907. Its main benefactor was Moses Aaron Dropsie (1821–1905), a wealthy man whose father was Jewish and mother was Christian but who self-identified as Jewish from the age of 14. In 1905, Dropsie left his entire fortune for the establishment of a Jewish college along broad lines, offering instruction "in the Hebrew and cognate languages and their respective literatures, and in the rabbinical learning and literature." Estimated at $800,000, equivalent to $29,000,000 in 2025, the amount of this bequest was the largest sum that had been made available for the promotion of Jewish studies. The will named a Board of Governors consisting of Cyrus Adler, Mayer Sulzberger, William H. Hackenburg, Oscar S. Straus, and Aaron Friedenwald to organize the institution and secure its charter. After Friedenwald’s death, his son Harry Friedenwald was appointed to fill the vacancy. The College received its charter in 1907, and instruction commenced in 1909, with Cyrus Adler as president and Max L. Margolis and Henry Malter as its first professors.

Dropsie College may have been designed by Lewis Pilcher or by Abraham Levy. It was built at Broad and York Streets. It was near the historic Spanish and Portuguese Congregation Mikveh Israel, Philadelphia's first Jewish congregation, then at 2321 N Broad Street. The first three presidents of Dropsie (Mayer Sulzberger, Cyrus Adler and Abraham A. Neuman) were worshipers there. They were instrumental in establishing the college and its library. Dropsie College sought to be grounded in the values, history, and "Science of Judaism."

On November 9, 1981, a fire ravaged the school's building at Broad and York Streets. In December 1983, the school moved to Temple Adath Israel of the Main Line in Merion where it was welcomed rent-free.

Dropsie granted more than 200 Ph.D.s between its inception and its closing as a degree-granting institution in 1986. Dropsie was also the publisher of the Jewish Quarterly Review, which was at the time the most respected journal on the subject.

The faculty at Dropsie included scholars from outside the United States, including Benzion Netanyahu, who came from Jerusalem with his young sons, Yonatan (Yoni) and Benjamin (Bibi), who there had their first true exposures to American culture, which would become a touchstone for later interactions with the American public for Bibi.

== Notable people ==
=== Dropsie students ===
- Barry J. Beitzel (1942–), American biblical and geographical scholar, professor of Old Testament and Hebrew, and Bible translator.
- Larry L. Walker (1932–2021), American biblical scholar, professor of Old Testament and Hebrew, and Bible translator
- Kenneth L. Barker (1931–), American biblical scholar, professor of Old Testament and Hebrew, and Bible translator
- William Sanford LaSor (1911-1991), American biblical scholar
- Philip Birnbaum (1904–1988), Polish-American author and translator, best known for his translation of the siddur
- Joshua Bloch (1890–1957), Lithuanian-American rabbi and librarian
- Raymond B. Dillard (1944–1993), American Old Testament scholar
- Iris Habib Elmasry (1910–1994), Coptic historian and scholar
- Simon Ginzburg (1890–1944), Hebrew poet, critic and historian. Obtained a PhD from Dropsie in 1923. Translated the letters of the Ramchal.
- Cyrus H. Gordon (1908–2001), Near East scholar – did not graduate
- R. Laird Harris (1911–2008), American Presbyterian minister and Old Testament scholar
- Louis L. Kaplan (1902–2001), President of Baltimore Hebrew University 1930–1970, Acting Chancellor of the University of Maryland, Baltimore County 1976–1977
- Meredith G. Kline (1922–2007), American theologian and Old Testament scholar – Ph.D. in Assyriology and Egyptology
- Samuel Noah Kramer (1897–1990), Ukrainian-American Assyriologist and Sumeriologist – did not graduate; transferred to Penn
- Albert L. Lewis (1917–2008), Congregational rabbi and professor of homiletics at the Jewish Theological Seminary of America
- Benzion Netanyahu (1910–2012), Zionist, scholar of Jewish history, and father of Israeli Prime Minister Benjamin Netanyahu
- James D. Price (1925–2025), American biblical scholar, professor of Old Testament and Hebrew, and Bible translator
- Frederic Clarke Putnam (1952-), American biblical scholar and linguist, Professor of Bible & Liberal Studies, Templeton Honors College
- Bernard Revel (1885–1940), future head of RIETS yeshiva and founder/President of Yeshiva College. 1911 doctoral thesis on Karaite Judaism
- Ephraim Speiser (1902–1965) Near East scholar and archaeologist, excavator of Tepe Gawra
- Edward J. Young (1907–1968), American Old Testament scholar and commentator
- Terry L. Eves (1952–2019), American biblical theology scholar and Professor of Old Testament
- Ronald F. Youngblood (1931–2014), American biblical scholar and Professor of Old Testament
- Richard Averbeck, American biblical scholar and Professor of Old Testament and Semitic Languages Trinity Evangelical Divinity School
- Simon Schwarzfuchs (1927-), French-Israeli rabbi and historian, Professor of Jewish History at Bar Ilan University.

=== Dropsie faculty ===
- Cyrus Adler, Jewish religious leader and scholar – president
- William Chomsky, noted Hebrew scholar and father of Noam Chomsky
- Benzion Halper, Hebraist and Arabist
- Benzion Netanyahu, historian of Jews in medieval Spain and father of Benjamin Netanyahu, Yonatan Netanyahu, and Iddo Netanyahu
- Raphael Patai, ethnographer and anthropologist – professor of anthropology, 1948–1957
- Stefan Reif, Jewish researcher – assistant professor of Hebrew, 1972–1973
- Solomon Zeitlin, historian of the second Jewish commonwealth and early Christianity.
- Solomon Gandz, research professor of the history of Semitic Civilization

== Reformation ==
By 1980, Dropsie College was near failing, its building in need of repairs and many of its books missing. On November 9, 1981, newly elected president David M. Goldenberg was notified of an arson attack, taking place on the forty-third anniversary of Kristallnacht. Attempts to put out the fire irreparably damaged the library and its contents, including rare books and ancient cuneiform tablets.

Goldenberg launched an extensive campaign to recover and restore the library, while board member Albert J. Wood worked to transform the college into a post-graduate research center. Wood attracted the support of philanthropist Walter Annenberg. Wood became the founding chairman of the board of the briefly renamed Moses Aaron Dropsie Research Institute, followed by Walter Annenberg as of September 13, 1985.

As of September 1986, Dropsie College ceased to be a degree-granting college. Also in 1986, Dropsie was renamed the Annenberg Research Institute. Annenberg funded the construction of a new building, to which the institution moved in 1988. The new location was just three blocks south of the new location of congregation Mikveh Israel, as well as the National Museum of American Jewish History. The proposed goal of the new institution was to support dialogue among the monotheistic faiths of Judaism, Christianity and Islam. Its directors were Bernard Lewis (1986–1990), Eric M. Meyers (1991–1992), and as acting director, David M. Goldenberg (1992–1993).

In 1993, the Annenberg Research Institute ceased to be an independent organization. It became part of the University of Pennsylvania, as the Center for Judaic Studies. In 1998, it was renamed the Center for Advanced Judaic Studies, and in 2008, the Herbert D. Katz Center for Advanced Judaic Studies. It is part of the Penn library system.

== Archives ==
The institutional records and library collections of Dropsie College are now part of the collections of the Herbert D. Katz Center for Advanced Judaic Studies, which is part of the University of Pennsylvania's library system.
