= Steven Weitzman (scholar) =

American scholar (born 1965)

- Born: Steven Phillip Weitzman; October 18, 1965 (age 61); Los Angeles, California, U.S.
- Occupation: Scholar
- Spouse: Mira Wasserman

Academic background
- Education: Granada Hills High School; University of California, Berkeley; Harvard University (PhD)

Steven Phillip Weitzman (born October 18, 1965) is an American scholar of Jewish studies and religious studies, with interests that include the origins and early history of Judaism and the history of the Bible's reception. He has served as the Ella Darivoff Director of the Herbert D. Katz Center for Advanced Judaic Studies at the University of Pennsylvania since 2014. He is also the Abraham M. Ellis Professor of Semitic Languages and Literatures in the department of Religious Studies at the University of Pennsylvania.

== Life and career ==
=== Education ===
Weitzman was born in Los Angeles, California. After graduating from Granada Hills High School, he attended UC Berkeley. He went on to Harvard University for graduate school where he received his PhD with distinction in 1993 in the field of Near Eastern Languages and Civilization. He is married to Rabbi Mira Wasserman.

=== Work ===
Weitzman served as the Irving M. Glazer Chair of Jewish Studies at Indiana University Bloomington, and, later, as Daniel E. Koshland Professor of Jewish Culture and Religion at Stanford University, directing the Jewish Studies programs of both universities. He now serves as the Ella Darivoff Director of the Herbert D. Katz Center for Advanced Judaic Studies and the Abraham M. Ellis Professor of Semitic Languages and Literatures in the department of Religious Studies, both at the University of Pennsylvania.

=== Research ===
Weitzman pursues research in three overlapping areas. His work draws on literary theory and religious studies to rethink questions of the Bible's meaning and contextualization, and to explore the history of the Bible's reception. A second line of research focuses on the emergence of Jewish culture in the centuries following the biblical age, a topic that encompasses the Dead Sea Scrolls, Jewish-Greek writers like Philo and Josephus, and Apocryphal/Deuterocanonical works like 1 Maccabees. His third area of scholarly inquiry involves efforts to bridge between the study of Jewish antiquity and the broader study of religion and Jewish history.

In recent years, Weitzman has also researched and published on American religious history, including the FBI's treatment of religious minorities. He is currently pursuing a study of Penn's Positive Psychology Center and its ongoing impact on American religious life.

Weitzman serves on the board of the journal Prooftexts.

== Bibliography ==
- Song and Story in Biblical Narrative (Indiana University Press, 1997), winner of the Gustave O. Arlt Prize for Outstanding Scholarship in the Humanities
- Surviving Sacrilege: Cultural Persistence in Jewish Antiquity (Harvard University Press, 2005)
- Religion and the Self in Antiquity, co-edited with David Brakke and Michael Satlow (Indiana University Press, 2005)
- Solomon, the Lure of Wisdom, part of Yale's Jewish Lives series (Yale University Press, 2011)
- From Generation to Generation: the Genetics of Jewish Populations, with Noah Rosenberg (special issue of the journal Human Biology, 2013)
- Rethinking the Messianic Idea in Judaism, co-edited with Michael Morgan (Indiana University Press, 2014)
- The Origin of the Jews: The Quest for Roots in a Rootless Age (Princeton University Press, 2017), winner of the 2017 National Jewish Book Award in Education and Jewish Identity
- The FBI and Religion, co-edited with Sylvester A. Johnson (University of California Press, 2017)
- The Jews: a History, 3rd edition, with John Efron and Matthias Lehmann (Routledge, 2019)
