= S. Ilan Troen =

Israeli scholar

Ilan Troen (Hebrew: אילן טרואן) is an Israeli scholar. He is the Karl, Harry and Helen Stoll Professor of Israel Studies at Brandeis University.

== Biography ==
Selwyn Ilan Troen grew up in the Boston, Massachusetts area. He is a graduate of Brandeis, with an M.A. and Ph.D. from the University of Chicago.

In 2023, Troen's daughter, Deborah Mathias, was murdered in the Holit Attack, along with his son-in-law, Shlomi. His grandson, Rotem was wounded but survived the attack.

== Academic career ==
When he joined the Brandeis faculty, the university announced that it was creating a chair in Israel Studies in order "to develop an accurate historical understanding of the origin and development of the State of Israel and its place in the world."

Troen believes that Israel's secular culture "has drawn from two important traditions: the prophetic tradition within Judaism and universal values generated by an enlightenment society."

Troen is a founder of the journal Israel Studies.

== Published works ==
- Troen, S. Ilan, Israel/Palestine in World Religions; Whose Promised Land?. Palgrave Macmillan, 2024
- Troen, S. Ilan and Rachel Fish, eds., Essential Israel; Essays for the 21st Century. Indiana University Press, 2017.
- Troen, S. Ilan and Jacob Lassner. Jews and Muslims in the Arab World; Haunted by Pasts Real and Imagined. 2007 ed. Lanham and New York: Rowman and Littlefield, 2007.
- Troen, S. Ilan. "Israel Studies." Israel Studies 12. 3 issues annually (2007): 600 pages.
- Troen, S. Ilan. Imagining Zion: Dreams, Designs, and Realities in a Century of Jewish Settlement. Yale University Press, 2003.
- Troen, S. Ilan and D.D. Moore. Divergent Jewish Cultures: America and Israel. Yale University Press, 2001.
- Troen, S. Ilan, ed. Jewish Centers and Peripheries; Europe between America and Israel Fifty Years After World War II. Transaction: New Brunswick and London, 1999.
- Troen, S. Ilan. and Noah Lucas, ed. Israel: The First Decade of Independence. Albany: State University of New York Press, 1995.
- Troen, S. Ilan and Klaus Bade, ed. Zuwanderung und Eingliederung von Deutschen und Juden aus der fruheren Sowjetunion in Deutschland und Israel. Bonn: Bundeszentrale dur politische Bildung, 1993.
- Troen, S. Ilan and Moshe Shemesh, ed. The Suez-Sinai Crisis 1956; Retrospective and Reappraisal. London and New York: Frank Cass and Columbia University Press, 1990.
- Troen, S. Ilan and Benjamin Pinkus, ed. Organizing Rescue: National Jewish Solidarity in the Modern Period. London: Frank Cass, 1988.
- Troen, Selwyn and Glenn Holt, S. Thernstrom and T. Hareven. St. Louis. New York: Franklin Watts - New Viewpoints, 1977.
- Troen, Selwyn The Public and the Schools: Shaping the Saint Louis System 1838-1920. University of Missouri Press, 1975.
