= Israel Studies =

Academic journal

- Discipline: Israel studies
- Language: English
- Edited by: Arieh Saposnik, Natan Aridan, S. Ilan Troen

Publication details
- History: 1996–present
- Publisher: Indiana University Press
- Frequency: Triannual

Standard abbreviations
- ISO 4: Isr. Stud.

Indexing
- ISSN: 1084-9513 (print); 1527-201X (web)
- LCCN: 96652911
- JSTOR: 10849513
- OCLC no.: 222761903

Links
- Journal homepage

Israel Studies is a triannual peer-reviewed academic journal covering the history, politics, society, and culture of the modern state of Israel. It was established in 1996 S. Ilan Troen as founding editor (Brandeis University). It is published by the Indiana University Press. The editors-in-chief are Arieh Saposnik, Natan Aridan, and S. Ilan Troen.

== Abstracting and indexing ==
The journal is abstracted and indexed in:

- EBSCO databases
- Emerging Sources Citation Index
- Index Islamicus
- International Bibliography of Periodical Literature
- International Bibliography of the Social Sciences
- Modern Language Association Database
- ProQuest databases
- Scopus
