= Cyrus Adler =

American educator, Jewish religious leader and scholar

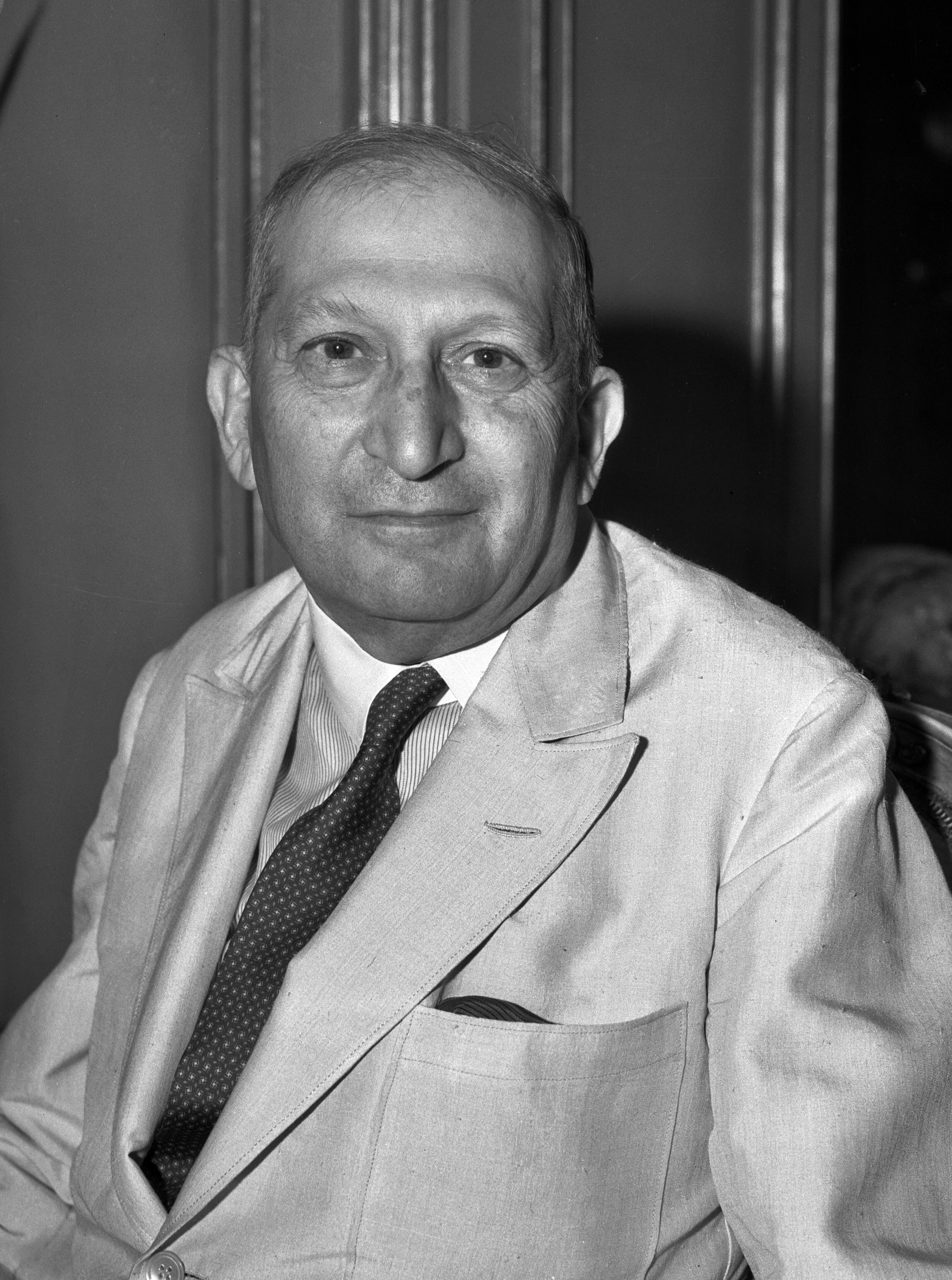
- Born: September 13, 1863; Van Buren
- Died: April 7, 1940; Philadelphia
- Education: Johns Hopkins University, University of Pennsylvania
- Occupations: educator, librarian, author, religious leader and scholar
- Employers: Jewish Theological Seminary of America; Johns Hopkins University (1884–); Katz Center for Advanced Judaic Studies; Smithsonian Institution (1877–)

Cyrus Adler (September 13, 1863 – April 7, 1940) was an American educator, Jewish religious leader and scholar.

== Early years ==
Adler was born to merchant and planter Samuel Adler and Sarah Sulzberger in Van Buren, Arkansas on September 13, 1863, but in the next year his parents removed to Philadelphia, Pennsylvania, and soon he attended the public schools there, and in 1879 he entered the University of Pennsylvania, from where he graduated in 1883. Afterwards, he pursued Oriental studies in Johns Hopkins University, where he was appointed university scholar in 1884, and fellow in Semitic languages from 1885 to 1887. He earned the first American PhD in Semitics from the university in 1887 and was appointed instructor in Semitic languages and promoted to associate professor in 1890. He taught Semitic languages at Johns Hopkins from 1884 to 1893.

== Career ==
In 1877 he was appointed assistant curator of the section of Oriental antiquities in the United States National Museum, and had charge of an exhibit of biblical archaeology at the centennial exposition of the Ohio valley in 1888. He was a commissioner for the world's Columbian exposition to the Orient in 1890, and he passed sixteen months in Turkey, Syria, Egypt, Tunis, Algiers, and Morocco securing exhibits. For a number of years he was employed by the Smithsonian Institution at Washington, with a focus on archaeology and Semitics, serving as the Librarian from December 1, 1892 to 1905. In 1895, after years of searching, he located the Jefferson Bible and purchased it for the Smithsonian Institution from the great-granddaughter of Thomas Jefferson.

At the Smithsonian Institution, Adler was the founding curator of its Judaica collection, which was substantially formed between 1887 and 1927 and documented Jewish religious and cultural life through ceremonial objects and other material culture.

He was made lecturer on biblical archaeology in the Jewish Theological Seminary in New York, president of the American Jewish Historical Society, U.S. delegate to a conference on an international catalogue of scientific literature in 1898, and honorary assistant curator of historic archaeology and custodian of historic religions in the U.S. national museum.

In 1900, he was elected as a member of the American Philosophical Society.

== Last years ==
He was a founder of the Jewish Welfare Board. He was president of Dropsie College for Hebrew and Cognate Learning from 1908 to 1940 and Chancellor of the Jewish Theological Seminary of America from 1915 to 1940. In addition, he was a founding member of the Oriental Club of Philadelphia. He was involved in the creation of various Jewish organizations including the Jewish Publication Society, the American Jewish Historical Society, the American Jewish Committee (also its president in 1929–1940), and the United Synagogue of America. Adler served a variety of organizations by holding various offices. For example, he was on the board of trustees at the American Jewish Publication Society and Gratz College, served as vice-president of the Anthropological Society of Washington, and as member of council of the Philosophical Society of Washington.

Adler married Racie Friedenwald of Baltimore in 1905, when he was 42. They had one child, a daughter named Sarah. From 1911 until 1916, Adler was Parnas (president) of Congregation Mikveh Israel of Philadelphia. He died in Philadelphia, and his papers are held by the Center for Advanced Judaic Studies at the University of Pennsylvania.

Adler's death was noted nationally. His passing was mourned by President Franklin Roosevelt and by Philadelphia Mayor Robert Lamberton In July, 1967 a street in Co-op City, Bronx was named in honor of Adler (Adler Place).

== Works ==
Adler was an editor of the Jewish Encyclopedia and in collaboration with Allen Ramsay wrote Tales Told in a Coffee House (1898). He was part of the committee that translated the Jewish Publication Society version of the Hebrew Bible published in 1917. At the end of World War I, he participated in the Paris Peace Conference in 1919.

He was also a contributor to the New International Encyclopedia. His many scholarly writings include articles on comparative religion, Assyriology, and Semitic philology. He edited the American Jewish Year Book from 1899 to 1905 and the Jewish Quarterly Review from 1910 to 1940. He was besides contributions to the Journal of the American Oriental Society, the Proceedings of the American Philological Association, the Andover Review, Hebraica, Johns Hopkins University Circular and numerous reviews.
