= David B. Ruderman =

American historian

Academic background
- Education: Hebrew University of Jerusalem

Academic work
- Discipline: Modern Jewish History
- Institutions: University of Pennsylvania
- Notable works: Jewish Enlightenment in an English Key: Anglo-Jewry's Construction of Modern Jewish Thought; The World of a Renaissance Jew: The Life and Thought of Abraham B. Mordecai Farissol
- Website: https://www.history.upenn.edu/people/faculty/david-b-ruderman

David B. Ruderman is the Joseph Meyerhoff Professor of Modern Jewish History at the University of Pennsylvania, Emeritus. From 1994 to 2014 he was the Ella Darivoff Director of Penn's Herbert D. Katz Center for Advanced Judaic Studies, where he also held a fellowship from 2017 to 2018. He was trained at the City College of New York, the Teacher's Institute of the Jewish Theological Seminary of America, and Columbia University. He earned rabbinical ordination from the Hebrew Union College-Jewish Institute of Religion in New York and his doctorate in Jewish History from The Hebrew University of Jerusalem. Prior to taking his position at the University of Pennsylvania, he held teaching positions at Yale University and the University of Maryland. He is a Fellow of the Royal Historical Society.

Ruderman is the author of numerous books, articles, and reviews. His monograph Jewish Enlightenment in an English Key: Anglo-Jewry's Construction of Modern Jewish Thought, received the Koret Book Award. His book, The World of a Renaissance Jew: The Life and Thought of Abraham B. Mordecai Farissol, was honored with the JWB National Book Award in Jewish History. Ruderman has been president of the American Academy for Jewish Research and is the recipient of a lifetime achievement award for his work in Jewish history from the National Foundation for Jewish Culture. In 2010 he was granted an honorary Doctor of Humane Letters, honoris causa, at HUC-JIR’s Graduation Ceremonies in New York, at which event Rabbi David Ellenson, HUC-JIR president said, Ruderman's “expertise in medieval and early modern Jewish history has influenced the international academy, the rabbinate, and the Jewish community in America. His prolific publications and dynamic leadership represent the epitome of the academic ideal.” Among his many honors are a fellowship at the American Academy of Berlin, and an Alexander von Humboldt Research Award.

== Works ==
- Preachers of the Italian ghetto. University of California Press. 1992. ISBN 978-0-520-07735-5.
- Jewish enlightenment in an English key: Anglo-Jewry's construction of modern Jewish thought. Princeton University Press. 2000. ISBN 978-0-691-04883-3.
- David B. Ruderman; Moshe Idel (2001). Jewish thought and scientific discovery in early modern Europe. Wayne State University Press. ISBN 978-0-8143-2931-3.
- David B. Ruderman; Giuseppe Veltri, eds. (2004). Cultural intermediaries: Jewish intellectuals in early modern Italy. University of Pennsylvania Press. ISBN 978-0-8122-3779-5.
- Connecting the covenants: Judaism and the search for Christian identity in eighteenth-century England. University of Pennsylvania Press. 2007. ISBN 978-0-8122-4016-0.
- Early modern Jewry: a new cultural history. Princeton University Press. 2010. ISBN 978-0-691-14464-1.
- Ruderman, David. "Jewish Intellectual History: 16th to 20th Century". The Teaching Company.
- Ruderman, David. "Between Cross and Crescent: Jewish Civilization from Mohammed to Spinoza". The Teaching Company.

== Awards ==
2010: National Jewish Book Award in the History category for Early Modern Jewry: A New Cultural History
