= American Academy for Jewish Research =

American scholarly association

The American Academy for Jewish Research is a scholarly association founded in 1919 with Louis Ginzberg serving as its first president. The historical context for the group's founding was the aftermath of World War One that saw the destruction of many centers of Jewish learning in Eastern Europe. And the group's activities began in 1920. The group's members included scholars from the Jewish Theological Seminary of America, the Hebrew Union College, Dropsie College and the Rabbi Isaac Elchanan Theological Seminary. Originally, Israel Friedlander was designated to serve as the inaugural president, however, Friedlander traveled to Europe on a relief mission and was killed in Ukraine. The death of several early members within the first decade of the group's founding resulted in the association significantly reducing its ambition to organise activities beyond the publication of scholarly articles.
