= Antisemitism in the Soviet Union =

Following the 1917 February Revolution in Russia, all legal restrictions on Russian Jews were lifted. However, the previous legacy of antisemitism was continued and furthered by the Soviet state, often associated with Joseph Stalin. After 1948, antisemitism reached new heights in the Soviet Union, especially during the anti-cosmopolitan campaign, in which numerous Yiddish-writing poets, writers, painters and sculptors were arrested or killed. This campaign culminated in the so-called doctors' plot, in which a group of doctors (almost all of whom were Jewish) were subjected to a show trial for supposedly having plotted to assassinate Stalin. Although repression eased after Stalin's death, persecution of Jews would continue until the late 1980s (see: refuseniks).

== History ==
=== Before the revolution ===
Under the rule of the tsars, Russian Jews were classified as inorodtsy, although Judaism was recognized as a legitimate religion. Most Jews were confined to the Pale of Settlement, and by the end of the 19th century, they numbered roughly five million. Within the Pale, they experienced prejudice and persecution, often in the form of discriminatory laws, such as restrictions on property rights and occupations. Despite a relaxation of some constraints in the 1860s as a result of the government reforms of Alexander II, by the end of the decade, antisemitism had acquired a systematic form. The conservative press blamed increasing radicalism on the Jews. Following the assassination of Alexander II in 1881, widespread pogroms targeted Jews in the Pale. Local officials enabled the pogroms or failed to stop them, and some of the perpetrators and victims believed that the pogroms were sanctioned at the highest level of government. Although the new tsar, Alexander III, viewed the pogroms as justified, he did not endorse popular violence. On the other hand, the right-wing press contributed to an atmosphere of sanctioned antisemitism.

In response to this oppression, many Jews either emigrated from the Russian Empire or joined radical political parties, such as the Jewish Bund, the Bolsheviks, the Socialist Revolutionary Party, and the Mensheviks. There were also numerous antisemitic publications of the era which gained widespread circulation.

== After the revolution ==
=== February Revolution and Provisional Government ===
The Russian Provisional Government cancelled all restrictions imposed on the Jews by the tsarist government, in a move parallel to the Jewish emancipation in Western Europe that had taken place during the 19th century abolishing Jewish disabilities.

=== The Bolsheviks ===
The October Revolution saw the Bolsheviks take power. The breakdown of other Jewish groups after the revolution gave the Yevsektsiya more sway over Jewish communities which has been described by historian Nora Levin as facilitating the destruction of traditional Jewish life, the Zionist movement, and Hebrew culture. In 1918, the Yevsektsiya was established to promote Marxism, secularism and Jewish assimilation into Soviet society, and supposedly bringing communism to the Jewish masses.

In March 1919, Lenin delivered a speech "On Anti-Jewish Pogroms" where he denounced antisemitism as an "attempt to divert the hatred of the workers and peasants from the exploiters toward the Jews". The speech was in line with the previous condemnation of the antisemitic pogroms perpetrated by anti-Bolshevik forces (White Army, Ukrainian People's Army and others) during the Russian Civil War. In 1914, Lenin had said "No nationality in Russia is as oppressed and persecuted as the Jews".

However, pogroms continued during 1918-1920, carried out by both the Red and White armies. The Red Guard participation shocked Bolshevik leadership and tempered the expectations of a reduction of antisemitism. Russian historian Dmitri Volkogonov wrote that Lenin, despite his rhetoric, did not see antisemitic incidents in the Red Army as a major concern and did not call for the perpetrators to be punished.

In August 1919, Jewish properties, including synagogues, were seized by the Soviet government and many Jewish communities were dissolved. The anti-religious laws against all expressions of religion and religious education were being taken out on all religious groups, including the Jewish communities. Many rabbis and other religious officials were forced to resign from their posts under the threat of violent persecution. This type of persecution continued on into the 1920s.

== Under Stalin ==
Joseph Stalin was elected General Secretary of the Soviet Union and a subsequent power struggle with Leon Trotsky ensued after Lenin's death. Those who knew Stalin, such as Nikita Khrushchev, suggest that Stalin had long harbored negative sentiments toward Jews that had manifested themselves before the 1917 Revolution. As early as 1907, Stalin wrote a letter differentiating between a "Jewish faction" and a "true Russian faction" in Bolshevism. Stalin has been described as resorting to antisemitism in some of his arguments against Trotsky, who was a Russian of Jewish descent. Stalin's secretary Boris Bazhanov stated that Stalin made crude antisemitic outbursts even before Lenin's death.

The official stance of the Soviet government under Joseph Stalin in 1934 was to oppose antisemitism "anywhere in the world" and claimed to express "fraternal feelings to the Jewish people", praising the Jewish contributions towards international socialism. Stalin adopted antisemitic policies which were reinforced with his anti-Westernism. (Note: Konstantin Azadovskii, an editorial board member of the cultural journal Novoe literaturnoe obozrenie, and Boris Egorov, a research fellow at Saint Petersburg State University, in an article titled From Anti-Westernism to Anti-Semitism published in the Journal of Cold War Studies writes "Stalin's policies of anti- Westernism and anti-Semitism reinforced one another and joined together in the notion of cosmopolitanism.") Antisemitism, as historian and anthropologist Raphael Patai and geneticist Jennifer Patai Wing put it in their book The Myth of the Jewish Race, was "couched in the language of opposition to Zionism". Since 1936, in the show trial of "Trotskyite-Zinovievite Terrorist Center", the suspects, prominent Bolshevik leaders, were accused of hiding their Jewish origins under Slavic names.

On 3 May 1939, Stalin fired foreign minister Maxim Litvinov, who was closely identified with the anti-Nazi position. The move opened Stalin's way to close ties with the Nazi state, as well as a quiet campaign removing Jews in high Soviet positions.

After World War II, antisemitism escalated openly as a campaign against the "rootless cosmopolitan" (a euphemism for "Jew"). In his speech titled "On Several Reasons for the Lag in Soviet Dramaturgy" at a plenary session of the board of the Soviet Writers' Union in December 1948, Alexander Fadeyev equated the cosmopolitans with the Jews. (Note: Konstantin Azadovskii and Boris Egorov in an article titled From Anti-Westernism to Anti-Semitism published in the Journal of Cold War Studies writes "In 1949, however, the attacks on cosmopolitans (kosmopolity) acquired a markedly anti-Semitic character. The very term cosmopolitan, which began to appear ever more frequently in newspaper headlines, was increasingly paired in the lexicon of the time with the word rootless (bezrodnye). The practice of equating cosmopolitans with Jews was heralded by a speech delivered in late December 1948 by Anatolii Fadeev at a plenary session of the board of the Soviet Writers' Union. His speech, titled "On Several Reasons for the Lag in Soviet Dramaturgy," was followed a month later by a prominent editorial in Pravda, "On an Anti-Patriotic Group of Theater Critics." The "anti- patriotic group of theater critics" consisted of Aleksandr Borshchagovskii, Abram Gurvich, Efim Kholodov, Yulii Yuzovskii, and a few others also of Jewish origin. In all subsequent articles and speeches the anti-patriotism of theater and literary critics (and later of literary scholars) was unequivocally connected with their Jewish nationality.") In this anti-cosmopolitan campaign, many leading Jewish writers and artists were killed. Terms like "rootless cosmopolitans", "bourgeois cosmopolitans", and "individuals devoid of nation or tribe" appeared in newspapers. (Note: Konstantin Azadovskii and Boris Egorov in an article titled From Anti-Westernism to Anti-Semitism published in the Journal of Cold War Studies writes "Terms such as rootless cosmopolitans, bourgeois cosmopolitans, and individuals devoid of nation or tribe continually appeared in newspaper articles. All of these were codewords for Jews and were understood as such by people at that time.") The Soviet press accused cosmopolitans of "groveling before the West", helping "American imperialism", "slavish imitation of bourgeois culture" and "bourgeois aestheticism". (Note: Konstantin Azadovskii and Boris Egorov in an article titled From Anti-Westernism to Anti-Semitism published in the Journal of Cold War Studies writes "Of the many crimes attributed to Jews/cosmopolitans in the Soviet press, the most malevolent were "groveling before the West," aiding "American imperialism," "slavish imitation of bourgeois culture," and the catch-all misdeed of "bourgeois aestheticism.") Victimization of Jews in the USSR at the hands of the Nazis was denied, Jewish scholars were removed from the sciences, and emigration rights were denied to Jews. Stalin's antisemitic campaign ultimately culminated in the Doctors' plot in 1953. According to Patai and Patai, the Doctors' plot was "clearly aimed at the total liquidation of Jewish cultural life". Communist antisemitism under Stalin shared a common characteristic with Nazi and fascist antisemitism in its belief in a "Jewish world conspiracy".

Soviet Moldovan dissident Mikhail Makarenko, who left Fascist Romania in 1939 due to rising antisemitism, said that antisemitism in the USSR was strong, despite the Soviet propaganda efforts to portray the Union as a country with no racism.

Soviet antisemitism extended to policy in the Soviet Occupation Zone of Germany. As described by the historian Norman Naimark, officials in the Soviet Military Administration in Germany (SVAG) by 1947–48 displayed a "growing obsession" with the presence of Jews in the military administration, particularly in the Cadres Department's Propaganda Administration. Jews in German universities who resisted Sovietisation were characterized as having "non-Aryan background" and being "lined up with the bourgeois parties".

Scholars such as Erich Goldhagen have said that following the death of Stalin, the policy of the Soviet Union towards Jews and the Jewish question became more discreet, with indirect antisemitic policies over direct physical assault. Goldhagen wrote that despite being famously critical of Stalin, Nikita Khrushchev did not view Stalin's antisemitic policies as "monstrous acts" or "rude violations of the basic Leninist principles of the nationality policy of the Soviet state".

Some historians have said that Stalin conceived of a plan for the mass deportations of Jews right before his death in 1953. This came after a slew of antisemitism attacks and tension between the Soviet Union and Israel. While there is no written record of it, many have pointed out that Soviet leaders at the time reported on the plot and some Soviet accounts seem to reference a plan for mass expulsion. Despite this, some historians have cast doubt on the historicity of this plot, such as by pointing to the lack of written sources in declassified documents from Stalin's time.

== Under Brezhnev ==
Antisemitism in the Soviet Union again peaked during the rule of Leonid Brezhnev, following Israeli victory in the 1967 Six-Day War. "Anti-Zionist" propaganda, including the film Secret and Explicit, was often antisemitic in nature. Many of Brezhnev's close advisors, most principally Mikhail Suslov, were also fervent antisemites. Jewish emigration to Israel and the United States, which had been allowed in limited numbers under the rule of Khrushchev, once more became heavily restricted, primarily due to concerns that Jews were a security liability or treasonous. Would-be emigrants, or refuseniks, often required a vyzov, or special invitation from a relative living abroad, for their application to be even considered by the Soviet authorities. In addition, in order to emigrate, one needed written permission from all immediate family members. The rules were often stretched in order to prevent Jews from leaving, and opportunities for appeal were rarely permitted. Substantial fees were also required to be paid, both to emigrate and as "reimbursement".

Institutional racism against Jews was widespread in the Soviet Union under Brezhnev, with many sectors of the government being off-limits. Following the failure of the Dymshits–Kuznetsov hijacking affair, in which 12 refuseniks unsuccessfully attempted to hijack a plane and flee west, crackdowns on Jews and the refusenik movement followed. Informal centres for studying the Hebrew language, the Torah and Jewish culture were closed.

Immediately following the Six-Day War in 1967, the antisemitic conditions drove many Soviet Jews to seek to emigrate to Israel. A Jewish-Ukrainian radio engineer, Boris Kochubievsky, sought to move to Israel. In a letter to Brezhnev, Kochubievsky stated:

I am a Jew. I want to live in the Jewish state. That is my right, just as it is the rights of a Ukrainian to live in the Ukraine, the right of a Russian to live in Russia, the right of a Georgian to live in Georgia. I want to live in Israel. That is my dream, that is the goal not only of my life but also of the lives of hundreds of generations that preceded me, of my ancestors who were expelled from their land. I want my children to study in the Hebrew language. I want to read Jewish papers, I want to attend a Jewish theatre. What is wrong with that? What is my crime ...?

Within the week he was called in to the KGB bureau and without questioning, was taken to a mental institution in his hometown of Kiev (for more information, see: Political abuse of psychiatry in the Soviet Union). This was not an isolated incident; the aftermath of the Six-Day War affected almost all of the Jewish population within the Soviet Union. Jews who had been subject to assimilation under previous regimes now possessed a new sense in vigour and revival in their Jewish faith and heritage. On February 23, 1979, a six-page article was distributed throughout the cities of Moscow and Leningrad, which criticized Brezhnev and seven other individuals for being "Zionist". The article contained traces of deep-rooted antisemitism in which the anonymous author, a member of the Russian Liberation Organization, set out ways to identify Zionists; these included "hairy chest and arms", "shifty eyes", and a "hook-like nose".

A major stride was made in the United States in regards to helping the Soviet Jews on 18 October 1974, when Senator Henry M. Jackson, National Security Advisor Henry Kissinger, Senator Jacob Javits and Congressman Charles Vanik met to discuss the finalization of the "Jackson–Vanik amendment" which had been in limbo in the United States Congress for nearly a year. After the meeting, Jackson told reporters that a "historic understanding in the area of human rights" had been met and while he did not "comment on what the Russians have done [...] there [had] been a complete turnaround here on the basic points". The amendment set out to reward the Soviet Union for letting some Soviet Jews emigrate.

On February 22, 1981, in a speech lasting over 5 hours, Brezhnev denounced antisemitism in the Soviet Union. While Lenin and Stalin had expressed much of the same views in various statements and speeches, this was the first time that a high-ranking Soviet official had done so in front of the entire Party. Brezhnev acknowledged that antisemitism existed within the Eastern Bloc and saw that many different ethnic groups existed whose "requirements" were not being met. For decades, people of different ethnic, or religious backgrounds were assimilated into Soviet society and denied the right or resources for education or for the practice their religion, as they had previously done. Brezhnev made it official Soviet policy to provide these ethnic groups with these "requirements" and cited a fear of the "emergence of inter-ethnic tensions" as the reason. The announcement of the policy was followed with a generic but significant Party message;

The CPSU [Communist Party of the Soviet Union] has fought and will always fight resolutely against such phenomena [inter-ethnic tensions] which are alien to the nature of socialism as chauvinism or nationalism, against any nationalistic aberrations such as, let us say, anti-Semitism or Zionism. We are against tendencies aimed at artificial erosion of national characteristics. But to the same extent, we consider impermissible their artificial exaggeration. It is the sacred duty of the party to educate the working people in the spirit of Soviet patriotism and socialist internationalism, of a proud feeling of belonging to a single great Soviet motherland.

While the issue of antisemitism seemed to have been raised casually and almost accidentally, it was very much calculated and planned, in line with usual Party practice. At this time, the Soviet Union was under global pressure to address many human rights violations that were taking place within their borders, and the statement responded to the inquiries of countries such as Australia and Belgium. While the Party seemed to be taking a hard stance against antisemitism, the fact remained that antisemitic propaganda had long been circulated in the Soviet Union, making immediate changes extremely difficult. Furthermore, Jewish organizations in Washington D.C. were calling attention to the problems of Soviet Jewry to American leaders.

Antisemitism, however, remained widespread both within and outside the Communist Party; antisemitic media continued to be published with the assent of the government, while antisemitic propaganda (believed variously to be the work of far-right groups or the Soviet government) spread throughout cities in the Soviet Union during the late 1970s. Mikhail Savitsky's 1979 painting, Summer Theatre, depicted a Nazi extermination camp guard and Jewish prisoner grinning between a pile of Russian corpses.

== In academia ==
Historian Semyon Charny, an employee of the Memorial human rights research centre, says that discrimination was originally inherent in the Soviet education system, but was based on class. A discriminatory system based on ethnicity in order to prevent Jews from entering certain universities emerged in the late 1940s. The Shorter Jewish Encyclopedia says that during this period "many faculties of Moscow, Leningrad, Kiev and other universities, the Moscow Engineering Physics Institute, the Moscow Physics and Technology Institute were completely or partially closed to Jews. Many academic institutions stopped hiring Jews." Lyudmila Alexeyeva, a human rights activist and member of the Moscow Helsinki Group, noted that "constraint in access to education is the most sensitive of the discriminatory measures against Jews, since the desire to educate children is one of the best preserved traditions in Jewish families."

One major element of discrimination was the large-scale denial of admission to the MSU Faculty of Mechanics and Mathematics for applicants of Jewish origin. A similar system operated at the Bauman Moscow State Technical University and some other prestigious universities.

The Faculty of Mechanics and Mathematics of Moscow State University admitted significantly fewer Jews in 1978 than under the conditions of the Jewish quota of the Russian Empire. That year, 21 graduates of one of the Moscow mathematical schools entered the faculty, including 14 Russians and seven Jews. All 14 Russians were accepted. Out of the seven Jews, only one was accepted (he received the 1st prize at the International Mathematical Olympiad and for three years in a row, received the 1st prize at the All-Union Olympiads). Among the rejected Jews, two were multiple winners of the Moscow Olympiad.

Mathematician and dissident Valery Senderov spoke about the methods by which the administration of the Mechanics and Mathematics Department did not allow Jewish applicants to enter the university. Jewish applicants were asked to solve the most complex mathematical problems of the All-Union and international mathematical Olympiads as problems for entrance exams, which was directly prohibited by the instructions of the USSR Ministry of Higher Education. Special problems were also designed, which technically had a solution within the limits of the school curriculum, but it was impossible to solve them in a reasonable time. In the oral examinations, questions were asked that went far beyond the scope of the school curriculum. Sometimes during oral examinations, Jewish applicants were gathered into separate groups, and the auditoriums where they took the exams were called "gas chambers" (Russian: газовые камеры). According to Mikhail Shifman, professor at the Institute of Theoretical Physics at the University of Minnesota, "only those Jewish applicants who, for special reasons, were not included in these groups, for example, the children of professors, academicians or other 'necessary' people, could enroll" in the Faculty of Mechanics and Mathematics at Moscow State University.

Academician Igor Shafarevich, speaking about the representation of different nationalities in prestigious areas, wrote about these exams:

On the other hand, it must be said by what means these problems were solved until recently - for example, in mathematics. Of course, I must say about them - they were monstrous. During the exams there was a struggle, a war with teenagers, almost children. They were asked meaningless or ambiguous questions that were confusing. This had a destructive effect on their psychology, on the psychology of them and other adolescents, who saw that applicants for exams were divided into groups. When they saw, for example, that from one audience they come out with solid twos, and another group with fours and fives. A class of such examiners was created. These people, of course, would be ready for other similar actions.

Academician Andrei Sakharov also commented on this discrimination. He wrote that similar methods were used not only against Jewish applicants, but also against the children of dissidents.

The problems themselves, offered to Jewish applicants for entrance exams at the Faculty of Mechanics and Mathematics of Moscow State University, gained fame and became the subject of discussion in the international scientific community.

== Right-wing movements ==
The first reports of neo-Nazi organizations in the USSR appeared in the second half of the 1950s. In some cases, the participants were attracted primarily by the aesthetics of Nazism (rituals, parades, uniforms, the cult of physical fitness, architecture). Other organizations were more interested in the ideology of the Nazis, their program, and the image of Adolf Hitler. The formation of neo-Nazism in the USSR dates back to the turn of the 1960s and 1970s; during this period, these organizations still preferred to operate underground.

Modern Russian neo-paganism took shape in the second half of the 1970s and is associated with the activities of supporters of antisemitism, especially the Moscow Arabist Valery Yemelyanov (pagan name Velemir) and the former dissident and neo-Nazi activist Alexey Dobrovolsky (pagan name Dobroslav).

In 1957, under the influence of the Hungarian Revolution, Dobrovolsky created the Russian National Socialist Party and was later imprisoned. Since 1964, he collaborated with the National Alliance of Russian Solidarists. On December 5, 1965, he organized a demonstration on Pushkin Square. In 1968, he was involved in the Trial of the Four. In 1969, Dobrovolsky bought a library and immersed himself in history, esotericism and parapsychology, collaborating with Valery Yemelyanov. In 1989, he took part in the creation of the "Moscow Pagan Community", which was headed by Alexander Belov (Selidor), and approved the eight-beam "kolovrat" as a symbol of "resurgent paganism". Since 1990, he collaborated with the neo-pagan Russian Party of Korchagin. Dobrovolsky conducted the first mass rite of naming, a rite that became widespread in the Rodnovery. Later, he retired to the abandoned village of Vasenyovo in Kirov Oblast, where he lived as a hermit and spent the summer holidays of Kupala. He led the "Russian Liberation Movement" (ROD).

Valery Yemelyanov (pagan name - Velemir) in 1967 defended his thesis at a Higher Party School. A good knowledge of the Arabic language and the peculiarities of the service allowed Yemelyanov to get extensive contacts in the Arab world, including the most senior officials. From these sources he drew his understanding of "Zionism". Yemelyanov was the author of one of the first manifestos of Russian neo-paganism - an anonymous letter titled "Critical notes of a Russian person on the patriotic magazine "Veche"", published in 1973. After the appearance of the notes, the journal was liquidated in 1974, and its editor, V. Osipov, was arrested.

In the 1970s, Yemelyanov wrote the book Dezionization, first published in 1979 in Arabic in Syria in the Al-Baʽath newspaper at the behest of Syrian President Hafez al-Assad. At the same time, a photocopied copy of this book, allegedly issued by the Palestine Liberation Organization in Paris, was distributed in Moscow. The book tells about the ancient civilization of the "Aryans-Veneti" (in particular, ideas from the Book of Veles are used; for example, Prav-Yav-Nav), the only autochthons of Europe who lived in harmony with nature and creating the first alphabet, but defeated by the Judeo-"Zionists", who were hybrids of criminals of different races, created by Egyptian and Mesopotamian priests. Since then, the world has been doomed to the eternal struggle of two forces - nationalist patriots and "Talmudic Zionists".

According to Yemelyanov, a powerful tool in the hands of "Zionism" is Christianity, created by the Jews specifically for the purpose of enslaving other peoples. To Yemelyanov, Jesus was at the same time "an ordinary Jewish racist" and a "Mason", and Prince Vladimir Svyatoslavich was endowed with Jewish blood. Among the illustrations for this book were reproductions of paintings by Konstantin Vasilyev on the theme of the struggle of Russian heroes with evil forces and, above all, the painting "Ilya Muromets defeats the Christian plague", which has since become popular with neo-pagans. The dissemination of the ideas described by Yemelyanov in Dezionization and at lectures in the Knowledge Society in the early 1970s caused an international protest, declared by the American Senator Jacob Javits to the Soviet Ambassador to the USA Anatoly Dobrynin in 1973, after which his lectures have been discontinued.

Yemelyanov began to accuse a wide range of people of "Zionism", including the ruling elite, headed by Leonid Brezhnev. In 1980, he tried to distribute copies of "Dezionization" among the members of the Politburo of the Central Committee of the CPSU and in its secretariat. In 1987, he founded the World Anti-Zionist and Anti-Masonic Front "Pamyat" (the neo-pagan wing of the "Pamyat" Society).

In 1970, a text called "The Word of the Nation" was distributed in the USSR in samizdat. It expressed the rejection of the liberal democratic ideas that were common at that time among part of the Russian dissidents, and the ideas of a strong state and the formation of a new elite were proclaimed as a program. To maintain order and fight crime, authoritarian power must rely on "people's druzhinas" (analogue of the "Black Hundreds") beyond the jurisdiction of any law. The author put forward demands to combat the "infringement of the rights of the Russian people" and "Jewish monopoly in science and culture", "biological degeneration of the white race" due to the spread of "democratic cosmopolitan ideas", "accidental hybridization" of races, a call for a "national revolution", after which "real Russians by blood and spirit" should become the ruling nation.

The full Russian version of this document was published in the emigrant magazine Veche in 1981, where the author wrote about the United States possibly turning into "an instrument for achieving world domination by the black race" and described Russia as having a special mission to save world civilization. The "Word of the Nation" was signed by "Russian patriots". Later it became known that its author was A. M. Ivanov (Skuratov), one of the founders of the Russian neopagan movement and a supporter of the struggle against "Judeo-Christianity".

At the end of 1971, a text entitled "Letter to Solzhenitsyn" signed in the name of "Ivan Samolvin", but written by Yemelyanov, was also distributed in samizdat. The "Letter" talked about the connections of the Jews with the Masons and a secret conspiracy to seize power over the world. The October Revolution is presented as the realization of these secret designs. It is argued that the "true history" of the ancestors of the Russian people is carefully hidden from the people. These documents had a significant impact on the development of Russian racism and neo-Nazism.

In Soviet times, Viktor Bezverkhy (Ostromysl) founded the movement of Peterburgian Vedism (a branch of Slavic neopaganism). He revered Hitler and Heinrich Himmler and propagated racial and antisemitic theories in a narrow circle of his students, calling for the deliverance of mankind from "inferior offspring", allegedly arising from interracial marriages. He called such "inferior people" "bastards", referred to them as "Zhyds, Indians or gypsies and mulattoes" and believed that they prevent society from achieving social justice.

At the age of 51, Bezverkhy took an oath "to devote his whole life to the fight against Judaism - the mortal enemy of mankind." The text of this oath, written in blood, was found on him during a search in 1988. Bezverkhy developed the theory of "Vedism", according to which, in particular: "all peoples will be sifted through a sieve of racial identity, the Aryans will be united, Asian, African and Indian elements will be put in their place, and the mulattoes will be eliminated as unnecessary." On the basis of the informal "Union of the Volkhvs" that existed since 1986, Bezverhim founded the "Union of the Veneti" in Leningrad in June 1990.

The first public manifestations of neo-Nazis in Russia took place in 1981 in Kurgan, and then in Yuzhnouralsk, Nizhny Tagil, Sverdlovsk, and Leningrad.

In 1982, on Hitler's birthday, a group of Moscow high school students held a Nazi demonstration on Pushkinskaya Square.

== See also ==
- Fifth line
- Antisemitism in Russia
- Antisemitism in the Russian Empire
- History of the Jews in Russia
- History of the Jews in the Soviet Union
- The Holocaust in Russia
- The Holocaust in the Soviet Union
- Israel–Russia relations
- Jewish Autonomous Oblast
- Person of Jewish ethnicity
- Racism in Russia
- Racism in the Soviet Union
- Refusenik
- Religion in Russia
- Religion in the Soviet Union
- Soviet Anti-Zionism
  - Anti-Zionist Committee of the Soviet Public
- Soviet Union and the Arab–Israeli conflict

In the Soviet bloc:

- Slánský trial, a 1952 antisemitic show trial against fourteen members of the Communist Party of Czechoslovakia

== Sources ==
- Busky, Donald F. (2002), Communism in History and Theory: From Utopian Socialism to the Fall of the Soviet Union, Greenwood Publishing Group, ISBN 978-0-275-97748-1
- Engelstein, Laura (2022). "Antisemitism in Late Imperial Russia and Eastern Europe through 1920". The Cambridge Companion to Antisemitism. Cambridge University Press. pp. 325–339. doi:10.1017/9781108637725.022. ISBN 978-1-108-49440-3.
- Griffin, Roger; Feldman, Matthew (2004), Fascism: Critical Concepts in Political Science, vol. V, Taylor & Francis, ISBN 978-0-415-29020-3
- Goldhagen, Erich (1987), "Communism and Anti-Semitism", The Persisting Question: Sociological Perspectives and Social Contexts of Modern Antisemitism, Walter de Gruyter, ISBN 978-3-11-010170-6
- Hampsher-Monk, Iain (1992), A History of Modern Political Thought: Major Political Thinkers from Hobbes to Marx, Wiley-Blackwell, ISBN 978-1-55786-147-4
- Laqueur, Walter (2006), The Changing Face of Anti-Semitism: From Ancient Times to the Present Day, Oxford University Press, ISBN 978-0-19-530429-9
- Mach, Zdzisław (2007), "Constructing Identities in a post-Communist Society: Ethnic, national, and European", Identity and Networks: Fashioning Gender and Ethnicity Across Cultures, Berghahn Books, ISBN 978-1-84545-162-2
- March, Luke (2002), "Evaluating the CPRF's ideology: backwards to socialism?", The Communist Party in Post-Soviet Russia, Manchester University Press, ISBN 978-0-7190-6044-1
- McLellan, David (1980), Marx before Marxism, Macmillan, ISBN 978-0-333-27882-6.
- Patai, Raphael; Patai, Jennifer (1989). The Myth of the Jewish Race. Wayne State University Press. ISBN 0-8143-1948-3..
- Possony, Stefan T. (1976), "Anti-Semitism in the Russian Orbit", Case Studies on Human Rights and Fundamental Freedoms: A World Survey, vol. 2, Martinus Nijhoff Publishers, ISBN 978-90-247-1781-1
- Ury, Scott. "The Epitome of Evil: On the Study of Antisemitism in Cold War Eastern Europe and Beyond." East European Jewish Affairs, 50, 3 (2020)
