= List of Jewish ethnonyms =

An ethnonym is the name applied to a given ethnic group. Ethnonyms can be divided into two categories: exonyms (where the name of the ethnic group has been created by another group of people) and autonyms or endonyms (self-designation; where the name is created and used by the ethnic group itself). This article does not cover ethnic slurs.

== List ==
Afrikaans	Jood
Albanian	çifut (i/ja) (ethnic)
Albanian	hebre (u/ja) (ethnic)
Albanian	izraelit (i/ja)
Arabic	يهودي Yahūdī (sl.); يهود Yahūd (pl.) بنو إسرائيل Banū Isra’il عبري ʕibrī
Azerbaijani	yəhudi
Armenian	հրեա hrea (sing.); հրեաներ hreaner (pl.)
Basque	Judu or judutar
Bengali	ইহুদী Ihudī, ইহুদি Ihudi
Bulgarian	Евреин, evrein (masc.); еврейка, evreika (fem.); евреи, evrei (pl.); юдеи, yudei (pl., archaic)
Bosnian	Jevrej, Jevrejin, Židov, Ćifut, Ćifo/Ćifko (probably from Turkish (Çıfıt) or Kurdish (Cihû), derogatory)
Catalan	Jueu (masc. sig.); jueus (masc. pl.), jueva (fem. sing.); jueves (fem. pl.)
Chinese	猶太人, Chinese, Traditional
Chinese	犹太人, Chinese, Simplified, pinyin: Yóutài Rén
Cornish	Yedhoweth
Croatian	Židov
Czech	Žid (as a member of nation) or žid (as a confessor of Judaism)
Danish	Jøde (sing.); Jøder (pl.)
Dutch	Jood
English	Jews, see Jew (word)^{1}
English	Hebrews^{2}
English	Israelites or Children of Israel^{3}
Esperanto	judo. L.L. Zamenhof described himself as hebreo.
Estonian	Juut
Finnish	Juutalainen
French	Juif (masc.); Juive (fem.), old formal term israélite (as in the Crémieux Decree)
Galego	Xudeu (masc. sing.); Xudía (fem. sing.); Xudeus (masc. pl.); Xudías (fem. pl.)
Georgian	ებრაელი, Ebraeli
German	Jude (masc.); Jüdin (fem.); Juden (pl.)
Greek	Ἰουδαῖος, Ioudaios^{1}
Greek	Ἑβραῖος, Hebraios (from Evrei)^{2}
Greek	Ἰσραηλίτης, Israelites (from Israel)^{3}
Hebrew	יהודי, Yehudi (sl.m); יהודיה, Yehudia (sl.f); יהודים, Yehudim/Yehudioth (pl.) ^{1}
Hebrew	עברי, Ivri (sl.m); עבריה, Ivria (sl.f); עברים, Ivrim/Ivrioth^{2}
Hebrew	בני ישׂראל, Bnei Yisrael (pl.)^{3}
Hindi	यहूदी Yahūdī
Hungarian	zsidó
Icelandic	gyðingur (sl.)
Indonesian/Malay	Yahudi, Banī Israel
Irish	Giúdach
Italian	Giudeo (masc. sing.); giudei (masc. pl.). This word has mostly a pejorative connotation, "ebreo" is nowadays preferred;
Italian	Ebreo (masc. sing.); ebrei (masc. pl.); ebrea (fem. sing.); ebree (fem. pl.)
Japanese	ユダヤ人, Yudayajin
Korean	유태인, Yutae-in
Kurdish	Cihû, Mûsayî/مووسایی, Cûleke/جوله که
Ladino	djudio, Judio (singular)
Ladino	los ebreos (the Jews)
Latin	Iudaeus^{1}
Latvian	Ebrejs (masc. sg.), ebrejiete (fem. sg.), ebreji (masc. pl.), ebrejietes (fem. pl). The terms žīds (masc. sg.), žīdiete (fem. sg.), žīdi (masc. pl.) and žīdietes (fem. pl.) were also used alongside up until World War II as a neutral ethnonym. However, post-World War II mainly due to it being used in the Nazi propaganda and the influence of Russian, the term has become to be traditionally considered derogatory.
Lithuanian	Žydas (sg.), žydai (pl.)
Luganda	Abayudaya (from "people of Judah")
Malayalam	യഹൂദൻ, yahudan
Mongolian	еврей, еврей
Norwegian	Jøde
Ojibwe	Zhoodawi (from the French: judéité) or Joowiwi (from the English: Jew)
Persian	جهود or يهود -- Johud (Persian) or Yahūd (from Middle Persian Yahūt)
Persian	کلیمی, Kalimi (religious) a follower of Kalim Allah, also a euphemism for Johud.
Polish	Żyd (sg.), Żydzi (pl. neutral), Żydowie (pl. respectful), Żydy (pl. contemptuous); żyd (sg.), żydzi (pl. neutral), żydowie (pl. respectful), żydy (pl. contemptuous) — as a confessors of Judaism
Portuguese	Judeu; judeus (masc. pl.); judia; judias (fem. pl.). Also hebreus and israelitas (both masc. pl.)
Romanian	Evreu, israelit, jidov (archaic), ovrei (archaic and demeaning), jidan (highly pejorative)
Russian	Еврей, Yevrey (sg.); Евреи, Yevrei^{2} (pl.): Typically denotes the ethnicity; жид, zhid (masc. sing, pejorative), жидовка, zhidovka (fem. sing., pejorative); Russian language being rich in inflection, there is a large number of pejorative forms derived from the two basic ones.
Russian	Иудей, Iudey (sg.); Иудеи, Iudei^{1} (pl.): Typically denotes the followers of Judaism.
Scottish Gaelic	Iùdach (sing. nom.) Iùdaich (pl. nom.)
Serbian	Јевреј Jevrej
Slovak	Žid
Spanish	Judío (m. sing) Judía (f. sing) Judíos (plu) Judías (f. plu)
Spanish	Hebreo (m. sing) Hebrea (f. sing) Hebreos (plu) Hebreas (f. plu)
Spanish	Israelita (sing) Israelitas (plu) as in "Asociación Mutual Israelita Argentina".
Swahili	Yahudi
Swedish	Jude
Tamazight	uday (pronounced [ʊðæj])
Tagalog	Hudyo, Israelita (both derived from Spanish)
Thai	คนยิว, khon yiu (from the English: Jew)
Tibetan	Yahutapa
Ukrainian	Жид (sl.); Жиди (pl.)
Urdu	یہودی Yahūdī (sl.); یہود Yahūd (pl.)
Vietnamese	người Do Thái
Turkish	Yahudi, Çıfıt (religious, and ethnic) something related to, or a follower of Judaism, latter usually considered pejorative.
Turkish	Musevi, (religious) a follower of Moses, an euphemism for Yahudi.
Turkish	İbrani, (ethnic) Hebrews.
Turkish	İsrailoğulları, Israelites
Welsh	Iddewon
Yiddish	איד,ייִד Yid^{1} (pronounced [ˈjɪd]) (sing.); ייִדן, Yidn (pronounced [ˈjɪdn̩]) (pl.)

== See also ==
- Jew (word)
- Person of Jewish ethnicity

== Footnotes ==
- ^{1} Ioudaios, Yehudi, Jewish, a "Judaean", "from the land of Yehuda (Judah, Judea)".
- ^{2} Ivri, Hebrew, "one who passes over", a reference to the Biblical patriarch Abraham (or possibly Eber).
- ^{3} Israel, "one who has struggled with God", the name given to the Biblical patriarch Jacob.
