= Russian Central Studio of Documentary Films =

Russian Central Studio of Documentary Film (Russian: Российская центральная студия документальных фильмов) was a Russian film studio, founded in 1927. It was the largest Soviet newsreel and documentary cinematography studio. It is headquartered in Moscow.

== History ==
Studio traced its history from 1927, when a special newsreel division of Sovkino was formed. In 1931 it was reorganized as the All-Union Newsreel Factory (Russian: Союзкинохроника, romanized: Soyuzkinochronicle). From 1936 it became known as the Moscow Newsreel Studio, and from 1940 as the Central Newsreel Studio.

From 1944 until 1993, it was known as the Central Studio for Documentary Film or CSDF (Russian: Центральная студия документальных фильмов, ЦСДФ).

In Soviet Union, the CSDF was responsible for newsreel series such as:

- News of the Day / "Новости дня"
- Foreign Newsreel / "Иностранная кинохроника"
- Soviet Sports / "Советский спорт"
- Soviet Cinema / "Советское кино"
- Pioneria / "Пионерия"

In 1944–1946 the studio director was Sergei Gerasimov. The studio produced a number of documentary films about the Great Patriotic War, including Moscow Strikes Back, winner of the 1942 Academy Award for Best Documentary.

At the end of 2014, the studio's premises in Kulakov Lane were transferred to the Russian Orthodox Church. In 2015, part of the archive related to the administrative and economic activities of the studio was moved to the premises of Mosfilm's Cinema Museum and the remaining part was transferred to the Russian State Film and Photo Archive. From that moment on, the production activities of the studio were stopped. By order of Rosimushchestvo, the deadline for the liquidation of studio was set at the end of 2015. The final liquidation took place in July 2018.

== Filmography ==
- Secret and Explicit (The Aims and Acts of Zionists)
- Pobeda na Pravoberezhnoi Ukraine i izgnaniye nemetsikh zakhvatchikov za predeli Ukrainskikh sovetskikh zemel (1945)
- The City That Stopped Hitler: Heroic Stalingrad
- Stalingrad (1943)
- Bitva za nashu Sovetskuyu Ukrainu (1943)
- Narodniye mstiteli (1943)
- Den voyny (1942)
- Den novogo mira (1940)
