= Fifth line =

Soviet idiom for ethnicity

Fifth line or fifth record (Russian: Пятая графа), Fifth point (Russian: Пятый пункт) is a Russian euphemism that originated in the Soviet Union, which indicated that an individual belonged to a certain ethnic group. In the Soviet Union, line number 5 for indicating ethnicity was on the Personal Record Sheet (Russian: Личный листок по учёту кадров) used by the passport departments of the Soviet Ministry of Internal Affairs (and not in the Soviet passport itself, as is often mistakenly believed). It was also on similar forms used by personnel departments of all state organizations. In the passport itself, the data fields, including "национальность" (natsionalnost), were not numbered.

Most often, it was a euphemism for the Jewish ethnicity, such as in the expressions "he has problems with his fifth line", due to anti-Semitism in the Soviet Union. People whose fifth record said "Jew" were discriminated against in various ways.

== History ==
The fifth line was labelled национальность (natsionalnost), which in this context meant "ethnic origin" (the other meaning being "nationality"). In the Soviet Union, indicating one's ethnic origin in the internal passport and other identity documents was mandatory. The nationality (ethnicity) of a citizen was recorded in the fifth line based on the ethnicity of citizen's parents (or one of them). If their ethnicities were different, then in accordance with the Resolution of the Council of Ministers of the Soviet Union "On the Passport System in the USSR" dated August 28, 1974, a citizen had the right to choose the ethnicity of his father or mother when receiving the first passport upon reaching the age of 16. After that, they had no right to change ethnicity. For children under 16, ethnicity was determined (if necessary), as a rule, by the father.

A person could determine ethnicity only from among the officially recognized peoples living on the territory of the Soviet Union, according to the List of Ethnicities of the Soviet Union, which was first compiled in 1924–1926.

Often, if the ethnicity of one of the parents was "problematic" (for example, Jewish, German, Crimean Tatar, etc.), a person chose the ethnicity of the other parent, which was more acceptable (Russian, Ukrainian, Belarusian, etc.)

Under Stalin's Soviet "national policy" repression was based on ethnicity or deportation of entire peoples. In the post-Stalin era, the presence of the "ethnicity" column in documents allowed the state to tacitly and unofficially implement "soft forms" of discrimination and restrictions on entire ethnic groups in civil rights. This concerned primarily such areas of life as the right to reside in certain territories of the Soviet Union, the right to a profession, education and place of work. Local minorities (non-titular peoples in national republics) were subject to discrimination in the territories of individual national republics, and throughout the entire USSR, representatives of such peoples as Jews, Germans, Crimean Tatars, Greeks, Meskhetian Turks, etc. were subjected to constant, unspoken oppression in terms of hiring, admission to universities, postgraduate studies, career advancement and holding leadership positions, receiving state awards and honorary titles, membership in government bodies and Soviet representative organizations, travel abroad, etc. This is where the ironic expression "disabled person of the fifth group" came from, meaning a person of "unsuitable" ethnicity.

In most post-Soviet States the indication of ethnicity in personal records has either been abolished or is no longer obligatory.

== See also ==
- Wolf's ticket
