= Moscow Strikes Back =

1942 war film by Ilya Kopalin and Leonid Varlamov

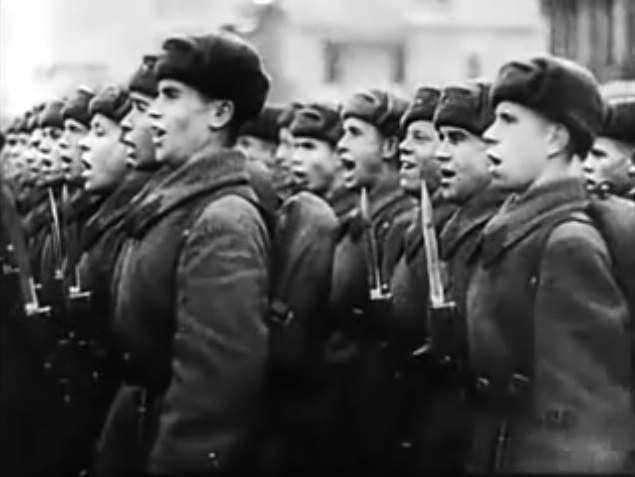
- 11:25 Red Army soldiers cheer Stalin in Red Square
- Directed by: Ilya Kopalin; Leonid Varlamov
- Produced by: Central Studio of Newsreels
- Starring: Generals Zhukov, Rokossovsky, ordinary soldiers
- Cinematography: Ivan Belyakov and others
- Music by: V. Smirnov
- Release date: February 23, 1942
- Running time: 55 minutes (English version)
- Country: USSR
- Language: Russian (subtitles)

Moscow Strikes Back (Note: Known in Russian as «Разгром немецких войск под Москвой» (Razgrom nemetskikh voysk pod Moskvoy; lit. 'Rout of the German troops near Moscow').) is a Soviet documentary film about the Battle of Moscow between October 1941 and January 1942. It was directed by Ilya Kopalin and Leonid Varlamov. It was one of four films that won a 1942 Academy Award for Best Documentary Feature.

== Plot ==
The film begins in Moscow, with civilians preparing defences in their streets. Men in civilian clothes with rifles prepare for battle. Women machine shell cases and prepare hand grenades. An apparently huge Stalin makes a battle speech in Red Square to thousands of cheering Red Army soldiers on parade with greatcoats, ushankas, and fixed bayonets.

Men, trucks, tanks, and artillery advance into battle. Anti-aircraft guns fire into the night sky, which is crisscrossed by searchlight beams. A crashed German bomber is seen in close-up. Russian fighters and bombers are readied and armed.

Artillery guns of many types fire many times. Tank crewmen scramble to their tanks and jump aboard. Tanks race across snow-covered plains towards the enemy. Snow-camouflaged troops parachute behind enemy lines. They collect skis parachuted to them and go into battle, lying down under fire before attacking again. Tanks rush from a forest across the snow, infantrymen riding on their rear decks or skiing into battle in large numbers. A tank is hit and explodes as the attack goes on. Russian infantry in greatcoats storm a village and clear the houses of surrendering German soldiers. Towns and cities are liberated. The Russian soldiers are greeted by smiling civilians. An old woman kisses several soldiers.

German atrocities are shown. The elegantly preserved houses of the playwright Anton Chekhov and the novelist Leo Tolstoy are seen badly damaged, the museum exhibits destroyed. The bodies of murdered civilians are shown. Quantities of destroyed German armour and transport are scattered across the landscape. Captured artillery is to be used against the Germans. The bodies of dead Germans are seen frozen in the snow. Maps show the extent of the Russian advance. The front line has retreated far from Moscow.

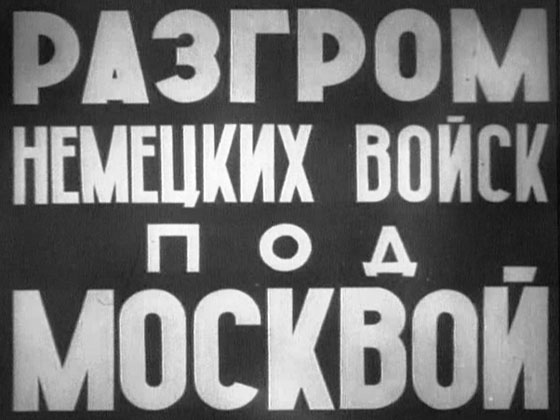
Title frame

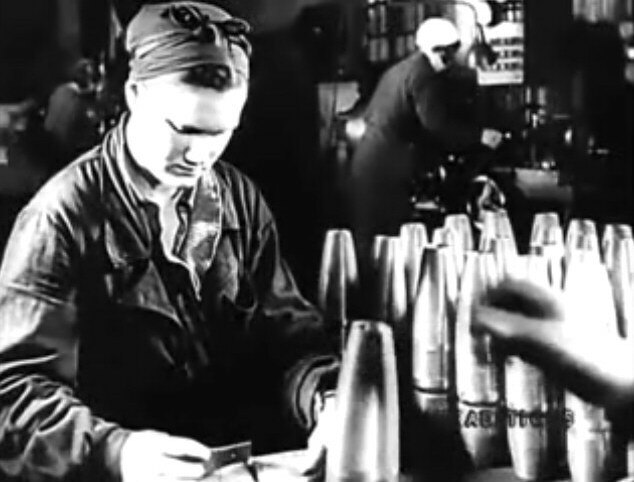
09:41 – Russian women making artillery shells

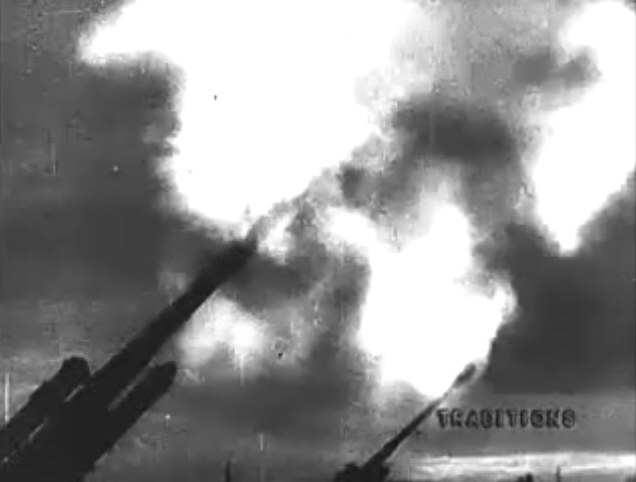
14:24 – Anti-aircraft guns fire at night

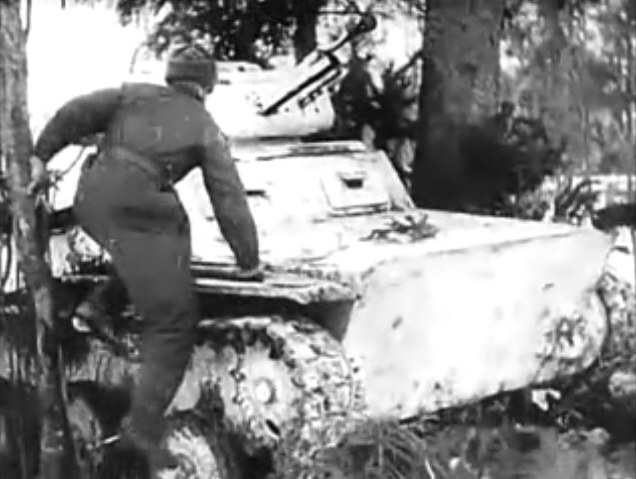
20:15 – A crewman jumps aboard his snow-camouflaged tank

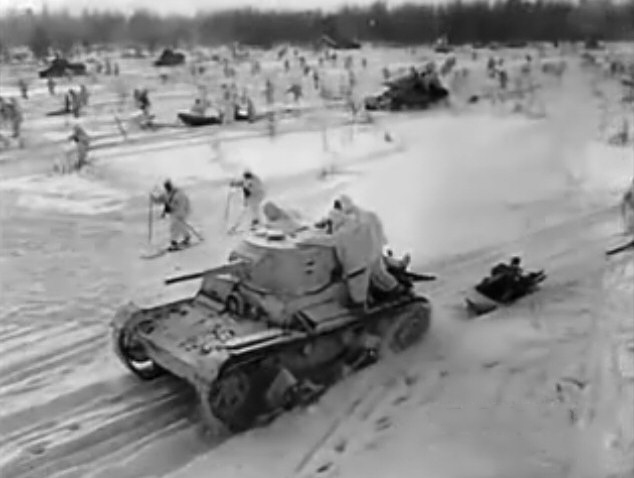
24:56 –Tanks and ski infantry attack

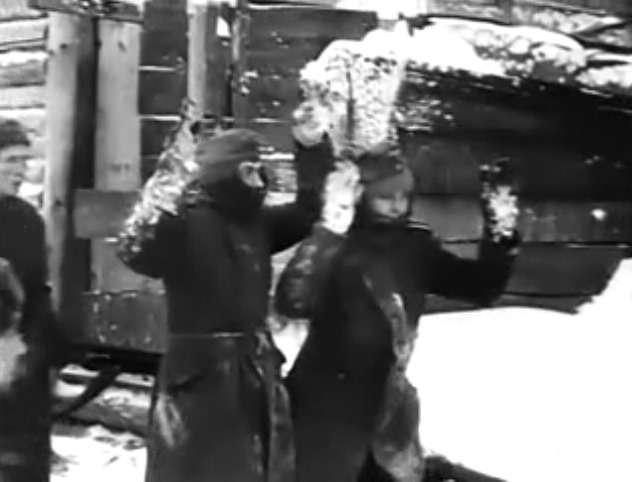
27:40 – German soldiers surrender

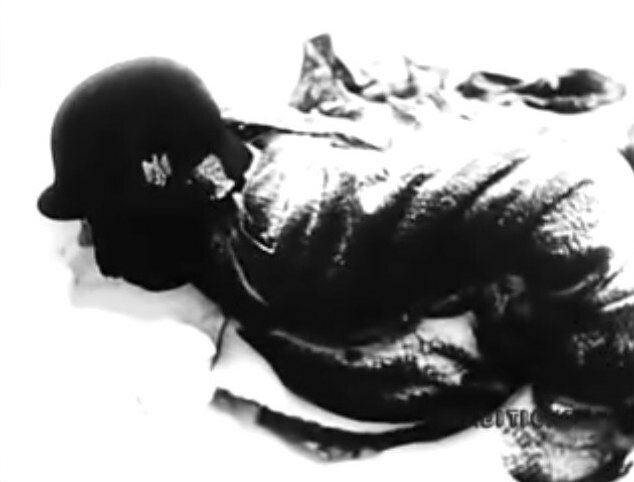
46:08 – dead German soldier, snow on back

== Production ==
=== Russian versions ===
Moscow Strikes Back was produced as "Project 6004; Information film #5", under the working titles of "Know Your Ally: Russia" and "War in the East". Preparation of the scenario started on 1 April 1942. A print of the completed film was provided to the Soviet authorities on 9 July 1943. Much of the footage was new; some was from American sources including newsreels, and some from captured German sources. Existing Russian films including Sergei Eisenstein's 1938 Alexander Nevsky were sampled. Three Russian versions were produced, consisting respectively of 6, 9, and 10 reels of film. The cinema release was in two parts, the first covering events up to 1941, and the second the subsequent events on the eastern front.

The film is said to have been translated into several languages for showing in different parts of the Soviet Union.

=== Foreign versions ===
The English version's narration was written by Albert Maltz, with uncredited writing by Jay Leyda, and Elliot Paul. It was distributed by Artkino Pictures and Republic Pictures. The film was first shown in New York on 15 August 1942 at the Globe Theatre. The New York Times credits it as: "Russian documentary produced by the Central Studios, Moscow, USSR; English commentary by Albert Maltz, narrated by Edward G. Robinson; editing and montage by Slavko Vorkapich; musical score arranged by Dimitri Tiomkin; released here through Artkino Pictures, Inc. At the Globe Theatre." Footage was included in Frank Capra's The Battle of Russia.

A French version, translated by André David, was narrated by Charles Boyer.

== Reception ==
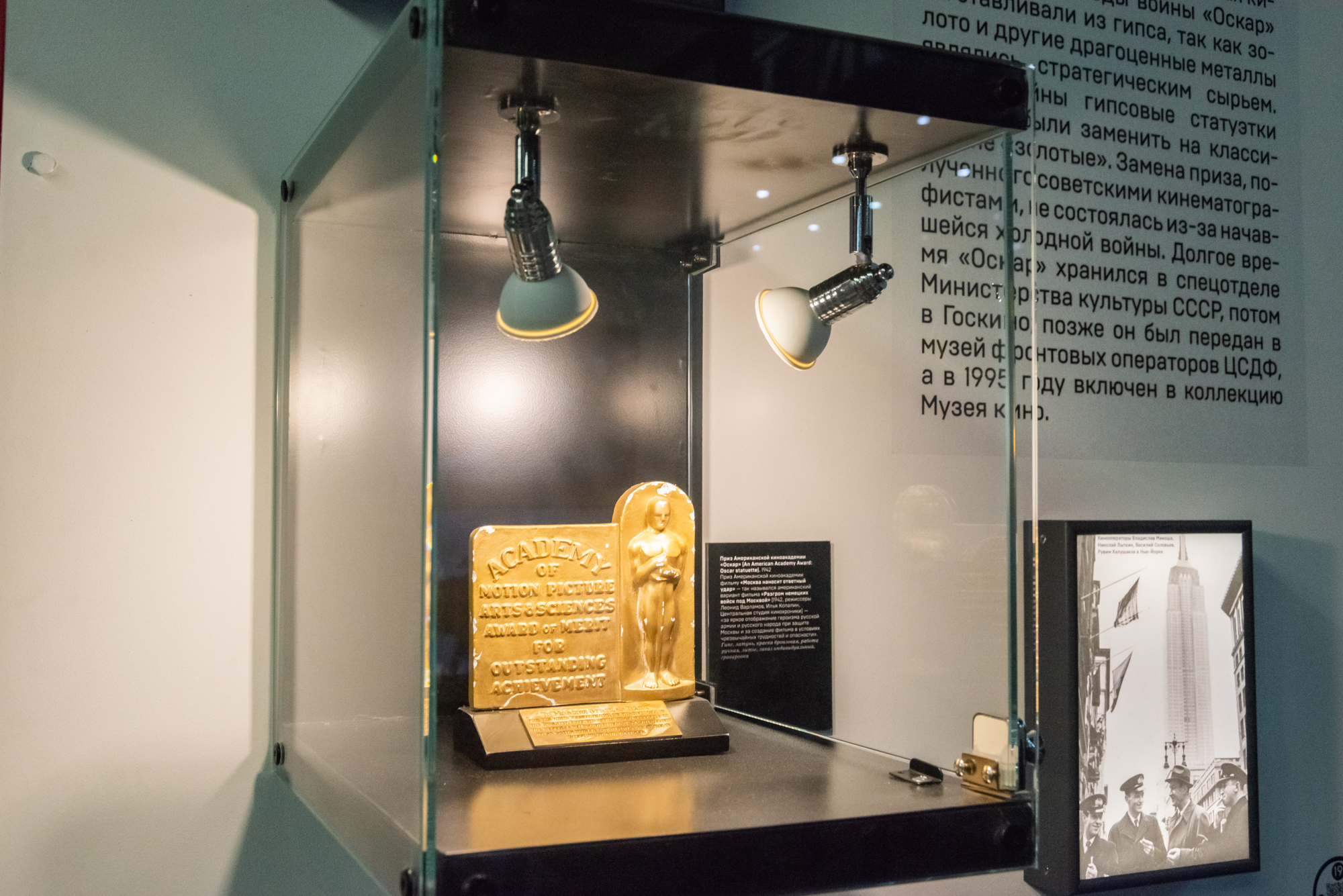
Plaster war-time Oscar plaque, State Central Museum of Cinema, Moscow. Due to a metal shortage during the war, Oscars were made of painted plaster for three years. Following the war, the academy invited recipients to redeem the plaster figures for gold-plated metal ones.

In 1942, the New York Times reviewed the film favourably, stating that the work of "Russian front-line cameramen" would "live in the archives of our time." The review stated that it was not "to be described in ordinary reviewer's terms" as the film was not staged but recorded in actual combat. It had a powerful effect, "sting[ing] like a slap in the face of complacence", and "lift[ing] the spirit with the courage of a people who have gone all-out." The Times reviewer described the film in detail, admitting that words are inadequate, and adds that "The savagery of that retreat is a spectacle to stun the mind." He found "infinitely more terrible" the sight of the atrocities, "the naked and slaughtered children stretched out in ghastly rows, the youths dangling limply in the cold from gallows that were rickety, but strong enough." The review concluded that "To say that Moscow Strikes Back is a great film is to fall into inappropriate cliché." Slavko Vorkapich's editing is described as brilliant; Albert Maltz's writing as terse, Robinson's voice-over as moving, "but that does not tell the story of what the heroic cameramen have done", filming "amid the fury of battle".

Stalin is said to have told Capra on his visit to Russia that he was happy with the film.

== Awards ==
In the USSR, the film was awarded the Stalin Prize. In America, it was one of four winners at the 15th Academy Awards for Best Documentary Feature. This was the USSR's first Oscar, awarded for the American cut of the film. This had been shortened by 14 minutes, recut, and re-narrated, without much of the Soviet ideology, from the Russian-language original. It gained an American audience of some 16 million. It also won the National Board of Review award for best documentary in 1942, and a New York Film Critics Circle Award for Best War Fact Film.

== See also ==
- Battle of Moscow (1985)
- Battle of Stalingrad
