= Ioudaios =

Ancient Greek ethnonym for Jews and Judeans

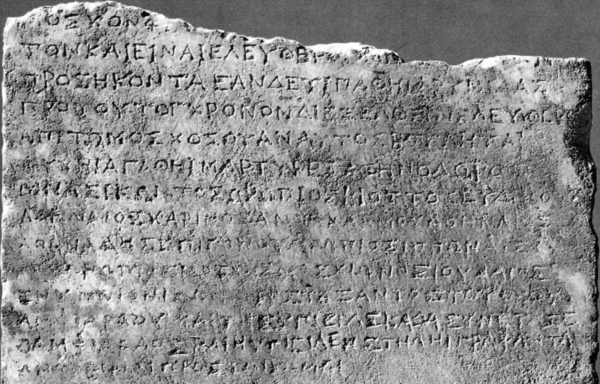
The first known occurrence of the singular Ioudaios is in the "Moschus Ioudaios inscription", dated c. 250 BC, from Oropos in Greece. The inscription describes a Ioudaios of Greek religion; such that in this context Shaye J. D. Cohen states the word must be translated as "Judean".

Ioudaios (Ancient Greek: Ἰουδαῖος; pl. Ἰουδαῖοι Ioudaioi) (Note: Ἰουδαῖος is the NOM SG form, Ἰουδαῖοι the NOM PL; likewise Ἰουδαίων Ioudaiōn GEN PL, Ἰουδαίοις Ioudaiois DAT PL, Ἰουδαίους Ioudaious ACC PL, etc.) is an Ancient Greek ethnonym used in classical and biblical literature which commonly translates to "Jew" or "Judean".

The choice of translation is the subject of frequent scholarly debate, given its central importance to passages in the Bible (both the Hebrew Bible and the New Testament) as well as works of other writers such as Josephus and Philo. Translating it as Jews is seen to imply connotations as to the religious beliefs of the people, whereas translating it as Judeans confines the identity within the geopolitical boundaries of Judea.

A related translation debate refers to the terms ἰουδαΐζειν (verb), literally translated as "Judaizing" (compare Judaizers), and Ἰουδαϊσμός (noun), controversially translated as Judaism or Judeanism.

== Etymology and usage ==
The Hebrew term Yehudi (יְהוּדִי) occurs 74 times in the Masoretic text of the Hebrew Bible. It occurs first in the Hebrew Bible in 2 Kings 16:6 where Rezin king of Syria drove the 'Jews' out of Elath, and earliest among the prophets in Jeremiah 32:12 of 'Jews' that sat in the court of the prison." In the Septuagint the term is translated Ioudaios.

According to Shaye J. D. Cohen, the meaning of the term "Ioudaios" evolved throughout the Second Temple period, with 2 Maccabees representing a greater emphasis on the cultural and religious aspects of Jewish identity. Despite this shift, later sources still highlight the importance of kinship and blood in Jewish national identity. For instance, Josephus recounts that Antigonus II Mattathias, the last Hasmonean king of Judea, labeled Herod a "half Judean," (ἡμιιουδαιος, or hemi-Ioudaios), referencing his Idumean ancestry, rather than his behavior.

== Ioudaismos ==
The Ancient Greek term Ioudaismos (Ἰουδαϊσμός; from ἰουδαΐζειν 'to side with or imitate the [Judeans]'), often translated as "Judaism" or "Judeanism", first appears in 2 Maccabees in the 2nd century BC. In the context of the age and period it held the meaning of seeking or forming part of a cultural entity and resembles its antonym Hellenismos, meaning acceptance of Hellenic (Greek) cultural norms (the conflict between Ioudaismos and Hellenismos lay behind the Maccabean revolt and hence the invention of the term Ioudaismos). Shaye J. D. Cohen wrote:

We are tempted, of course, to translate [Ioudaismos] as "Judaism," but this translation is too narrow, because in this first occurrence of the term, Ioudaismos has not yet be reduced to designation of a religion. It means rather "the aggregate of all those characteristics that makes Judaeans Judaean (or Jews Jewish)." Among these characteristics, to be sure, are practices and beliefs that we would today call "religious," but these practices and beliefs are not the sole content of the term. Thus Ioudaïsmos should be translated not as "Judaism" but as Judaeanness.

== Translation implications ==
As mentioned above, translating it as "Jews" has implications about the beliefs of the people whereas translation as "Judeans" emphasizes their geographical origin.

The word Ioudaioi is used primarily in three areas of literature in antiquity: the later books of the Hebrew Bible and Second Temple literature (e.g. the Books of the Maccabees), the New Testament (particularly the Gospel of John and Acts of the Apostles), and classical writers from the region such as Josephus and Philo.

There is a wide range of scholarly views as to the correct translations with respect to each of these areas, with some scholars suggesting that either the words Jews or Judeans should be used in all cases, and other scholars suggesting that the correct translation needs to be interpreted on a case-by-case basis.

One complication in the translation question is that the meaning of the word evolved over the centuries. For example, Morton Smith, writing in the 1999 Cambridge History of Judaism, states that from c.100 BCE under the Hasmoneans the meaning of the word Ioudaioi expanded further:

For clarity, we may recall that the three main earlier meanings were:
(1) one of the descendants of the patriarch Judah, i.e. (if in the male line) a member of the tribe of Judah;
(2) a native of Judaea, a "Judaean";
(3) a "Jew", i.e. a member of Yahweh's chosen people, entitled to participate in those religious ceremonies to which only such members were admitted.
Now appears the new, fourth meaning:
(4) a member of the Judaeo-Samaritan-Idumaean-Ituraean-Galilean alliance

In 2001, the third edition of the Bauer lexicon, one of the most highly respected dictionaries of Biblical Greek, supported translation of the term as "Judean", writing:

Incalculable harm has been caused by simply glossing Ioudaios with 'Jew,' for many readers or auditors of Bible translations do not practice the historical judgment necessary to distinguish between circumstances and events of an ancient time and contemporary ethnic-religious-social realities, with the result that anti-Judaism in the modern sense of the term is needlessly fostered through biblical texts.

In 2006, Amy-Jill Levine took the opposite view in her Misunderstood Jew, writing: "The translation 'Jew', however, signals a number of aspects of Jesus' behavior and that of other 'Jews', whether Judean, Galilean, or from the Diaspora: circumcision, wearing tzitzit, keeping kosher, calling God 'father', attending synagogue gatherings, reading the Torah and Prophets, knowing that they are neither Gentiles nor Samaritans, honoring the Sabbath, and celebrating the Passover. All these, and much more, are markers also of traditional Jews today. Continuity between Judeans and Jews outweighs the discontinuity."

Academic publications in the last ten to fifteen years increasingly use the term Judeans rather than Jews. Most of these writers cite Steve Mason's 2007 article, "Jews, Judaeans, Judaizing, Judaism: Problems of Categorization in Ancient History". Mason and others argue that "Judean" is a more precise and a more ethical translation of ioudaios than is "Jew". Much of the debate stems from the use of the term in the New Testament where Ioudaios is often used in a negative context. Translating Ioudaios as "Judeans" implies simply people living in a geographic area, whereas translating the term as "Jews" implies a legalistic religious and ethnic component which in later Christian works was characterized as a religion devoid of "grace", "faith", and "freedom". It is this later understanding which some scholars have argued was not applicable in the ancient world. They argue that the New Testament texts need to be critically examined without the baggage that Christianity has associated with the term "Jew". Others such as Adele Reinhartz argue that New Testament anti-Judaism cannot be so neatly separated from later forms of anti-Judaism. It has also been suggested that “Judean” can refer to believers of the Judean God and allies of the Judean state.

In 2014, Daniel R. Schwartz distinguishes "Judean" and "Jew", where the former means "Of or pertaining to Judea or southern Palestine", while the latter refers "A person belonging to the worldwide group constituting a continuation through descent or conversion of the ancient Jewish people and characterized by a sense of community".

In 2018, Seth Schwartz dismissed the claim that "Jews" and "Judaism" are anachronistic for antiquity and rejected the rendering of Ioudaioi as "Judeans." He described this view as "a nugatory argument," one that carries the "unintentionally problematic implication" of an "absolute discontinuity between ancient Jews and medieval or modern Jews." He wrote that it was "easily refuted" on two grounds: the English word "Jews" is not in fact a religious designation, and although early Christian writers did deploy "Judaism" as an insult, the word already appears in earlier Greek-language Jewish sources in a sense that "inescapably denotes, well, Judaism." He added that the Fathers also used christianismos, asking whether "all -isms" were therefore meant as insults. He closed by faulting Steve Mason, whose "rash policy decision," as editor of the Brill Josephus, to print "Judean" forced him into a "vigorous though strained and incoherent defense of the practice."

In 2021, Lester L. Grabbe explained that he translates the terms Ἰουδαῖος, Iudaeus, and יהודי as "Jew" when they appear in historical sources, using the term "Judaean" specifically for individuals who lived in, or were born in, the geographic region of Judea.

In 2024, Jodi Magness, wrote the term Ioudaioi refers to a "people of Judahite/Judean ancestry who worshipped the God of Israel as their national deity and (at least nominally) lived according to his laws."

== Language comparison ==
The English word Jew derives via the Anglo-French "Iuw" from the Old French forms "Giu" and "Juieu", which had elided (dropped) the letter "d" from the Medieval Latin form Iudaeus, which, like the Greek Ioudaioi it derives from, meant both Jews and Judeans / "of Judea".

However, most other European languages retained the letter "d" in the word for Jew; e.g. Danish and Norwegian jøde, Dutch jood, German Jude, Italian giudeo, Spanish judío etc.

The distinction of translation of Yehudim in Biblical Hebrew between "Judeans", and "Jews" is relevant in English translations of the Bible.

English	Modern Hebrew	Modern Standard Arabic	Latin	Ancient Greek
Jew	יהודי Yehudi	يهودي Yahudi	Iudaeus	Ἰουδαῖος Ioudaios
"of Judea" or "Judean"	יהודי Yehudi	يهودي Yahudi	Iudaeus	Ἰουδαῖος Ioudaios
Judea	יהודה Yehudah	يهودية Yahudiyya	Iudaea	Ἰουδαία Ioudaiā

== See also ==
- Race of Jesus
- Who is a Jew
- Jew (word)
- King of the Jews
- Hellenistic Judaism
- Judaizers
- Proselytes
- History of the Jews in the Roman Empire
- Hebrews
- Israelites

== Notes and references ==
Notes
