= Ilya Kopalin =

Soviet film director (1900–1976)

Ilya Petrovich Kopalin (Russian: Илья́ Петро́вич Копа́лин; 1900–1976) was a Soviet film director remembered for his documentaries. His most famous footage is that of Stalin, Churchill and Roosevelt at the Yalta Conference and that of Yuri Gagarin's space flight.

== Life ==
He was born the son of a peasant on 2 August 1900 in the village of Pavlovskaya, Zvenigorod on the outskirts of Moscow. In his youth he worked in a factory in Moscow. After October 1917 he trained first as a land surveyor then as a pilot. A chance meeting with Dziga Vertov led him instantly into an interest in the cinema. Aged 24 he went to work for Vertov as a camera-man, working on films such as Kinoglaz, but later would work independently. His early films look at country life and agriculture in the newly created USSR.

His work gained him six Stalin Prizes and the Order of Lenin. He died in Moscow on 12 June 1976.

== Filmography ==
- Moscow (1927)
- For the Harvest (1929)
- Fifteen Years of Soviet Cinematography (1933)
- Engineers of the Human Soul (1934) – a documentary recording the First Congress of Soviet Writers
- Abyssinia (1935)
- China's Rebuff (1937)
- Ma Dunae (On the Danube) (1940) – Stalin Prize second degree (1941)
- Rout of the German Troops at Moscow (1941) – Stalin Prize first degree (1942)
- Stalin's Speech of November 6, 1942 (1943)
- Moscow Strikes Back (1942) – Academy Award for Best Documentary Feature
- Crimea Conference (1945)
- Liberated Czechoslovakia (1945) – Stalin Prize second degree (1946)
- Victory Day Country (1948) – Stalin Prize second degree (1948)
- New Albania (1949) – Stalin Prize third degree (1949)
- Man Conquers Nature (1950) – Stalin Prize third degree (1951)
- Albania (1953)
- Great Farewell (1953)
- For Peace and Friendship (1954)
- Songs over the Vistula (1955)
- Festival Melody (1955)
- Warsaw Meeting (1956)
- Lulz Shippers (1959)
- Destiny of a Great City (1961)
- First Flight to the Stars (1961) – a chronicle of Yuri Gagarin's space flight
- Tocsin of Peace (1963)
- Qunetra Ruins Accused (1974)
