= Rootless cosmopolitan =

Soviet epithet used against Jewish intellectuals

"Rootless cosmopolitan" (Russian: безродный космополит, romanized: bezródnyj kosmopolít) was a pejorative epithet that was mostly applied to creatives, intellectuals, and prominent political figures, particularly Jewish ones, during the Stalinist era of the Soviet Union.

In the Communist Party's discourse, rootless cosmopolitans were defined as unpatriotic Soviet citizens who disseminated foreign influence and favoured the socio-political atmosphere or aesthetics of Western Europe or the United States.

It became especially prevalent during the country's anti-cosmopolitan campaign, which began in 1946 and continued until Stalin's death in 1953, as part of an assault on "bourgeois Western influences" that widely targeted writers and other intellectuals. At first, this campaign was directed against anyone, regardless of nationality, who "groveled before the West", but by 1949, the campaign had taken an antisemitic turn, culminating in the "exposure" of the non-existent "doctors' plot" against the Communist Party of the Soviet Union.

The term is considered to be an antisemitic trope.

== Origin ==
The expression "rootless cosmopolitan" was coined in the 19th century by Russian literary critic Vissarion Belinsky to describe writers who lacked Russian national character.

== Use under Stalin ==
The term is associated with the anti-cosmopolitan campaigns of the Soviet Union following World War II.

The campaign began when the Central Committee of the Communist Party of the Soviet Union under the leadership of Andrei Zhdanov passed a resolution targeting two state newspapers, Zvezda and Leningrad, for publishing material of satirist Mikhail Zoshchenko and the poet Anna Akhmatova. Both were denounced and expelled from the Union of Soviet Writers. This marked the beginning of the Zhdanov Doctrine in the Soviet Union.

According to the doctrine, Soviet artists and writers were expected to support socialism and reject Western, particularly bourgeois or individualist, influences. All forms of creative expression had to follow the principles of socialist realism, glorifying the state, the working class, and communist values. The policy led to widespread censorship, suppression of artistic freedom, and condemnation of prominent figures in the arts and academia.

The campaign continued after the death of Zhdanov. In 1948, his successor, Georgy Aleksandrov, published an article denouncing early Soviet political figures as 'rootless cosmopolitans'. These included Pavel Milyukov, Nikolai Bukharin, Georgy Pyatakov, and Alexander Yashchenko as well as Left Socialist Revolutionaries and Left Communists.

Prominent Soviet figures denounced as 'cosmopolitans' during the campaign:

- Anna Akhmatova, Russian writer
- Mikhail Zoshchenko, Russian satirist
- Pavel Milyukov, Russian historian and politician
- Nikolai Bukharin, Russian revolutionary and politician
- Georgy Pyatakov, Russian-Ukrainian revolutionary and politician
- Dmitri Shostakovich, Russian pianist and composer
- Sergei Prokofiev, Russian composer
- Aram Khachaturian, Armenian composer
- Dmitri Klebanov, Ukrainian composer
- Vano Muradeli, Georgian opera composer
- Daniil Andreyev, Russian writer and mystic
- Lydia Chukovskaya, Russian writer and poet

== Definitions ==
Andrei Zhdanov's first mention of the term "rootless cosmopolitanism" was in a 1948 speech to the Central Committee of the CPSU. Zhdanov provides the following definition:

Internationalism is born where national art flourishes. To forget this truth means [...] to lose one's face, to become a rootless cosmopolitan.

According to the journalist Masha Gessen, a concise definition of rootless cosmopolitan appeared in an issue of Voprosy istorii (The Issues of History) in 1949:

The rootless cosmopolitan [...] falsifies and misrepresents the worldwide historical role of the Russian people in the construction of socialist society and the victory over the enemies of humanity, over German fascism in the Great Patriotic War.

Gessen states that the term used for "Russian" is an exclusive term that means ethnic Russians only and so they conclude that "any historian who neglected to sing the praises of the heroic ethnic Russians [...] was a likely traitor".

According to Cathy S. Gelbin:

From 1946 onwards, then, when Andrei Zhdanov became director of Soviet cultural policy, Soviet rhetoric increasingly highlighted the goal of a pure Soviet culture freed from Western degeneration. This became apparent, for example, in a piece in the Soviet weekly Literaturnaya Gazeta in 1947, which denounced the claimed expressions of rootless cosmopolitanism as inimical to Soviet culture. From 1949 onwards, then, a new series of openly antisemitic purges and executions began across the Soviet Union and its satellite countries, when Jews were charged explicitly with harbouring an international Zionist cosmopolitanist conspiracy.

According to Margarita Levantovskaya:

The campaign against cosmopolitanism of the 1940s and 1950s [...] defined rootless cosmopolitans as citizens who lacked patriotism and disseminated foreign influence within the USSR, including theater critics, Yiddish-speaking poets and doctors. They were accused of disseminating Western European philosophies of aesthetics, pro-American attitudes, Zionism, or inappropriate levels of concern for Jewry and its destruction during World War II. The phrase "rootless cosmopolitan" was synonymous with "persons without identity" and "passportless wanderers" when applied to Jews, thus emphasizing their status as strangers and outsiders.

== See also ==
- Jewish parasite – antisemitic trope
- Mankurt – neologism for those who have lost touch with their roots
- Person of Jewish ethnicity – Russian euphemism
- Night of the Murdered Poets
- Antisemitism in the Soviet Union
- Globalism § Usage in national politics
