= Jew (word) =

English term derived from Hebrew "Yehudi"

The English term Jew is originally derived from the Hebrew term Yehudi (lit. 'of Judah'), which passed into Greek as Ioudaios and into Latin as Iudaeus, in turn evolving into the Old French term giu after the letter "d" was dropped. A variety of related forms are found in early English from about the year 1000, including Iudea, Gyu, Giu, Iuu, Iuw, and Iew, which eventually developed into the modern English word for the Jewish people.

== Etymology ==
=== Yehudi in the Hebrew Bible ===
Map of the region in the 9th century BCE

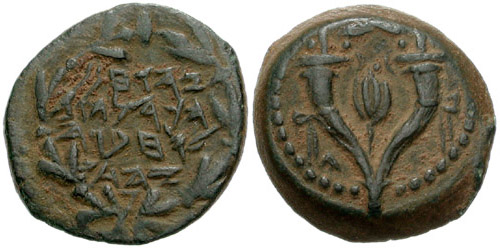
Hasmonean coin of John Hyrcanus (134 to 104 BCE) with the inscription Hayehudim ("of the Jews")

According to the Book of Genesis, Judah (יְהוּדָה, Yehudah) was the name of the fourth son of the patriarch Jacob. During the Exodus, the name was given to the Tribe of Judah, descended from the patriarch Judah. After the conquest and settlement of the land of Canaan, Judah also referred to the territory allocated to the tribe. After the splitting of the united Kingdom of Israel, the name was used for the southern kingdom of Judah. The kingdom now encompassed the tribes of Judah, Benjamin and Simeon, along with some of the cities of the Levites. With the destruction of the northern kingdom of Israel (Samaria), the kingdom of Judah became the sole Jewish state and the term y'hudi (יהודי) was applied to all Israelites.

The term Yehudi (יְהוּדִי) occurs 74 times in the Masoretic Text of the Hebrew Bible. The plural, Yehudim (הַיְּהוּדִים) first appears in 2 Kings 16:6 where it refers to a defeat for the Yehudi army or nation, and in 2 Chronicles 32:18, where it refers to the language of the Yehudim (יְהוּדִית). Jeremiah 34:9 has the earliest singular usage of the word Yehudi. In Esther 2:5–6, the name "Yehudi" (יְהוּדִי) has a generic aspect, in this case referring to a man from the tribe of Benjamin:

"There was a man a Yehudi (Jewish man) in Shushan the capital, whose name was Mordecai the son of Jair the son of Shimei the son of Kish, a Benjamite; who had been exiled from Jerusalem with the exile that was exiled with Jeconiah, king of Judah, which Nebuchadnezzar, king of Babylon, had exiled."

The name appears in the Bible as a verb in Esther 8:17 which states:

"Many of the people of the land became Yehudim (in the generic sense) (מִתְיַהֲדִים, mityahadim) because the fear of the Yehudim fell on them."

In some places in the Talmud the word Israel(ite) refers to somebody who is Jewish but does not necessarily practice Judaism as a religion: "An Israel(ite) even though he has sinned is still an Israel(ite)" (Tractate Sanhedrin 44a). More commonly the Talmud uses the term Bnei Yisrael, i.e. "Children of Israel", ("Israel" being the name of the third patriarch Jacob, father of the sons that would form the twelve tribes of Israel, which he was given and took after wrestling with an angel, see Genesis 32:28–29) to refer to Jews. According to the Talmud then, there is no distinction between "religious Jews" and "secular Jews."

In modern Hebrew, the same word is still used to mean both Jews and Judeans ("of Judea"). In Arabic the terms are yahūdī (sg.), al-yahūd (pl.), and بَنُو اِسرَائِيل banū isrāʼīl. The Aramaic term is Y'hūdāi.

=== Development in European languages ===
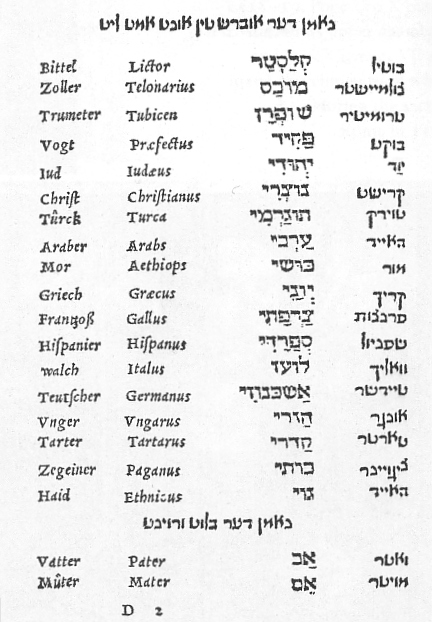
A page from Elia Levita's Yiddish–Hebrew–Latin–German dictionary (16th century) contains a list of nations, including an entry for Jew: Hebrew: יְהוּדִי Yiddish: יוּד German: Jud Latin: Iudaeus

The Septuagint (reputedly a product of Hellenistic Jewish scholarship) and other Greek documents translated יְהוּדִי, Yehudi and the Aramaic Y'hūdāi using the Koine Greek term Ioudaios (Ancient Greek: Ἰουδαῖος; pl. Ἰουδαῖοι Ioudaioi), which had lost the 'h' sound. The Latin term, following the Greek version, is Iudaeus, and from these sources the term passed to other European languages. The Old French giu, earlier juieu, had elided (dropped) the letter "d" from the Latin Iudaeus. The Middle English word Jew derives from Old English where the word is attested as early as 1000 in various forms, such as Iudeas, Gyu, Giu, Iuu, Iuw, Iew. The Old English name is derived from Old French. The modern French term is "Juif/Juive" (m/f).

Most European languages have retained the letter "d" in the word for "Jew". Etymological equivalents are in use in other languages, e.g. Jude in German, judeu in Portuguese, jøde in Danish and Norwegian, judío in Spanish, jood in Dutch. In some languages, derivations of the word "Hebrew" are also in use to describe a Jew, e.g., Ebreo in Italian and Spanish, Ebri / Ebrani (Persian: عبری/عبرانی) in Persian and Еврей Yevrey in Russian. (See List of Jewish ethnonyms for a full overview.) The German word Jude ([ˈjuːdə]) is cognate with the usual Yiddish word for "Jew", Yid, but not directly; it is, on phonological grounds, more probably cognate with the variant form Jüde (perhaps a back-formation from the feminine Jüdin and the adjective jüdisch), which has been obsolete in Standard German since the 18th century, but was the principal form used by Martin Luther, and can still be found in street names (Jüdenstraße or Jüdengasse) in traditionally Lutheran north German cities such as Berlin (two instances) or Göttingen. The direct cognate Yud, seen in the illustration on the right, is far less frequent.

=== Jewish dictionary definitions and etymologies ===
According to the Klein dictionary by Rabbi Ernest Klein, the Hebrew word for Jew, Judean, or Jewish (יְהוּדִי, Yehudi) originally meant 'member of the tribe of Judah'; later, it also came to mean 'member of the Kingdom of Judah'. After the conquest of the Kingdom of Israel by the Assyrians in 722 B.C.E., only the Kingdom of Judah survived, at which point Yehudi came to denote 'Jew', resp. 'Jewish'. cp. 'Judaic', 'Jew', 'Chueta' and 'Yiddish'.

According to Rabbi Marcus Jastrow's dictionary, Yehudi is defined as "worshipper of one God", or one who rejects idolatry.

Meg. 12^{b} קרי ליה י׳ אלמא מיהודה וכ׳ he is called Y'hudi (Esth. II, 5), which would indicate that he belongs to the tribe of Judah, and yet he is called ish y'mini &c.?, v. נִימוֹס. Ib. 13^{a} ... ואמאי י׳ ... שכל הכופר בע"ז נקרא י׳ but why is he designated as Y'hudi? Because he disowned idolatry; for whosoever disowns idolatry, is called a Jew (ref. to Dan. III, 12); Esth. R. to II, 5 לפי שייחד ... נקרא י׳ לומר י׳ יחירי because he professed the unity of God, he was called Y'hudi, meaning to say, a Y'hudi, a believer in One God.

— Marcus Jastrow, Jastrow's Dictionary

== Modern use ==
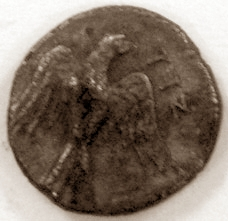
Obverse of a Jewish silver Yehud coin from the Persian era, with falcon or eagle and Aramaic inscription "יהד" "Yehud" (Judaea)

In modern English and other contemporary languages, the term "Israelite" was used to refer to contemporary Jews as well as to Jews of antiquity until the mid-20th-century. Since the foundation of the State of Israel, it has become less common to use "Israelite" of Jews in general. Instead, citizens of the state of Israel, whether Jewish or not, are called "Israeli", while "Jew" is used as an ethno-religious designation.

The word Jew has been used often enough in a disparaging manner by antisemites that in the late 19th and early 20th centuries it was frequently avoided altogether, and the term Hebrew was substituted instead (e.g. Young Men's Hebrew Association). The German counterpart Jude was extensively used during the Nazi period as a part of its anti-semitic campaign (eventually leading to the Holocaust). The word has become more often used in a neutral fashion, as it underwent a process known as reappropriation. Even today some people are wary of its use, and prefer to use "Jewish". Indeed, when used as an adjective (e.g. "Jew lawyer") or verb (e.g. "to Jew-down someone"), the term Jew is purely pejorative. According to The American Heritage Dictionary of the English Language, Fourth Edition (2000):

It is widely recognized that the attributive use of the noun Jew, in phrases such as Jew lawyer or Jew ethics, is both vulgar and highly offensive. In such contexts Jewish is the only acceptable possibility. Some people, however, have become so wary of this construction that they have extended the stigma to any use of Jew as a noun, a practice that carries risks of its own. In a sentence such as There are now several Jews on the council, which is unobjectionable, the substitution of a circumlocution like Jewish people or persons of Jewish background may in itself cause offense for seeming to imply that Jew has a negative connotation when used as a noun.

=== Russian euphemism ===
"Person of Jewish ethnicity" (Russian: лицо еврейской национальности) is а Russian circumlocution used as a euphemism for "Jew". The word "Jew" was occasionally avoided in the Soviet Union as it perceived as pejorative due to antisemitism in the Soviet Union. In 2002, writer Vladimir Voinovich described this perception as follows:

The word "Jew" is not censored, but it is used in a scientific sense, like the Latin "penis". Sometimes it is necessary to say this word, but when pronouncing it there is a hesitation, the speaker tries to pass it inconspicuously through and immediately move on. A person calls himself Russian, Ukrainian, Tatar as simply as a mechanic, a baker, an engineer, but everyone who says "I’m a Jew" somehow tenses up and either squeezes it out as a confession, or says with a challenge: "yes, I'm a Jew, so what?"

Notable Soviet antisemitic campaigns included the Doctor's Plot, the struggle against the "rootless cosmopolitans" and the crackdown on the movement of refuseniks. However, the entire Jewish population was never openly and officially declared the enemy of the people. Instead, several dog whistles were used, such as Zionists, rootless cosmopolitans, and "persons of Jewish ethnicity". There was an important distinction between these words: zionist and rootless cosmopolitans served as a label for "bad Jews" as enemies of the state, whereas "persons of Jewish ethnicity" was a politically correct expression for "good", loyal Jews, who were called by some ordinary folks as trained Jews ("дрессированные евреи"). Regardless, most people realized that all these euphemisms denoted all Jews. A dean of the Marxism-Leninism department at one of the Soviet universities explained the policy to his students:

One of you asked if our current political campaign can be regarded as antisemitic. Comrade Stalin said: "We hate Nazi[s] not because they are Germans, but because they brought enormous suffering to our land". Same can be said about the Jews.

=== In other cultures ===
Michael Dorfman reports the same attitude to the word "Jew" in the United States: both in the establishment, and among ordinary people, including the Jews themselves. He wrote:

Other presidents, from Reagan to Obama, also found it difficult to pronounce the word “Jew” and “Jews,” preferring to use American equivalents of “persons of Jewish ethnicity.” In eight years of Passover greetings, Obama never once said the word “Jew.”

== See also ==
- Israel (name)
- History of the Jews in the Soviet Union
- List of Jewish ethnonyms
- Zhyd
