= Nora Levin =

American historian

- Born: September 20, 1916; Philadelphia, Pennsylvania
- Died: October 26, 1989 (aged 73); Philadelphia, Pennsylvania
- Education: Drexel University
- Scientific career
- Fields: the Holocaust
- Workplaces: Gratz College

Nora Levin (September 20, 1916 – October 26, 1989) was an American historian of the Holocaust and a writer. She was most interested in the topics of the Jewish Labor Bund, social Zionists, and Jews during the Holocaust.

== Biography ==
Levin was born on September 20, 1916, in Philadelphia, where she lived most of her life. She received her B.S. in education from Temple University and her M.L.S. from Drexel University. She served as the executive director of the Philadelphia Council of Pioneer Women, the women's Labor Zionist organization from 1948 to 1953.

She worked as a librarian and teacher and later became professor of history of Gratz College in Philadelphia, where she was the founding director of the Holocaust Oral History Archive. She also was a member of the Advisory Editorial Board of the Occasional Papers on Religion in Eastern Europe journal (OPREE) from its inception to her death. Apart from various articles, Levin wrote three comprehensive books about her main topics as a historian: the Holocaust; Jewish socialist and labour movements; and Jewish life in Europe in general, with a focus on Eastern Europe.

Levin also served on the executive boards of the Soviet Jewry Council, the Philadelphia Jewish Community Relations Council, the National Conference of Christians and Jews, and the Hebrew Immigration Aid Society. She died on October 26, 1989.

She was awarded a D.H.Lit in 1989 by Philadelphia's Gratz College of Jewish Studies.

== Works ==
- The Holocaust : the destruction of European Jewry, 1933-1945 (1968; reprint in 1990 as The Holocaust years)
- Jewish socialist movements, 1871-1917 : while Messiah tarried (1977)
- The Jews in the Soviet Union since 1917 : paradox of survival (two volumes) (1988/1989)

Articles by Levin are available on the Berman Jewish Policy Archive, including:

- "Tolerating the Nazis among us", Sh'ma: A Journal of Jewish Responsibility, Vol. 9, no. 163 (1978)
- "Jewish social work, a rejoinder", Sh'ma: A Journal of Jewish Responsibility, Vol. 9, no. 166 (1979)
- "Gratz Holocaust archive of Soviet Jews", Sh'ma: A Journal of Jewish Responsibility, Vol. 20, no. 391 (1990)

== Awards ==
- 1969: National Jewish Book Awards in the Holocaust category for The holocaust : the destruction of European Jewry, 1933-1945
