= Hebrews =

Ancient Semitic-speaking people

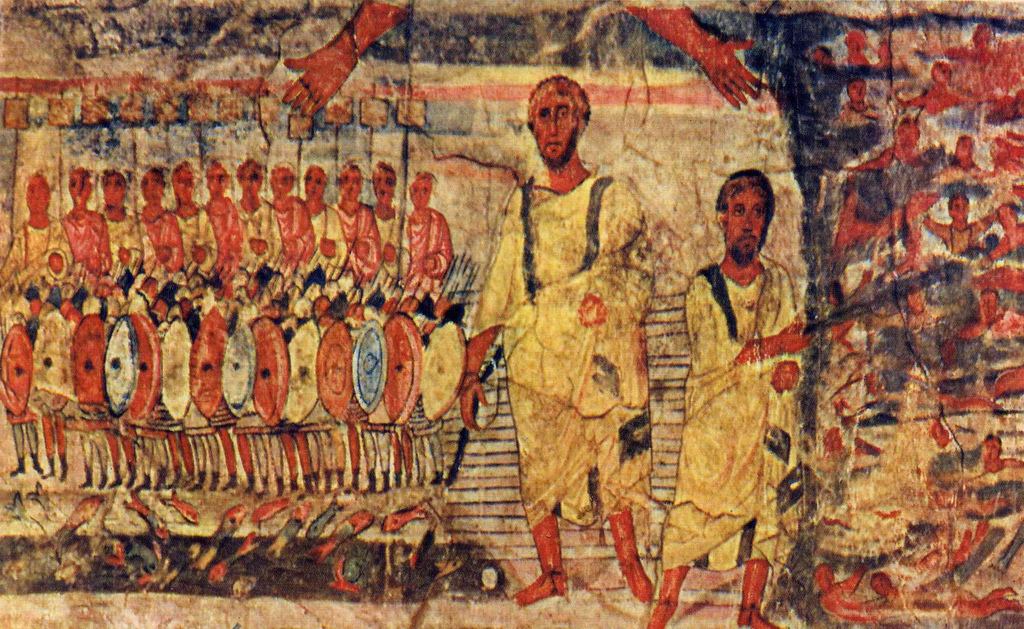
Moses leads the Israelites across the Red Sea while pursued by Pharaoh. Fresco from the Dura-Europos synagogue in Syria, 244–256 CE

The Hebrews (Hebrew: עִבְרִיִּים / עִבְרִים, Modern: ʿĪvrīm / ʿĪvrīyyīm, Tiberian: ʿĪḇrīm / ʿĪḇrīyyīm; ISO 259-3: ʕibrim / ʕibriyim) were an ancient Semitic-speaking people. Historians mostly consider the Hebrews as synonymous with the Israelites, with the term "Hebrew" denoting an Israelite from the nomadic era, which preceded the establishment of the Kingdom of Israel and Judah in the 11th century BCE. However, in some instances, the designation "Hebrew" may also be used historically in a wider sense, referring to the Phoenicians or other ancient Semitic-speaking civilizations, such as the Shasu on the eve of the Late Bronze Age collapse. It appears 34 times within 32 verses of the Hebrew Bible. Some scholars regard "Hebrews" as an ethnonym, while others do not, and others still hold that the multiple modern connotations of ethnicity may not all map well onto the sociology of ancient Near Eastern groups.

By the time of the Roman Empire, the term Hebraios (Greek: Ἑβραῖος) could refer to any member of the Jewish people in general (as Strong's Hebrew Dictionary puts it: "any of the Jewish nation") or, at other times, specifically to those Jews who lived in Judea, which was a Roman province from 6 CE. Among early Christians, the term referred to Jewish Christians, as opposed to the Judaizers and to the gentile Christians.

In Armenian, Georgian, Italian, Greek, Kurdish, Romanian, and a few other languages, the transfer of the name from "Hebrew" to "Jew" never took place, and "Hebrew" (or the linguistic equivalent) remains the primary word used to refer to an ethnic Jew.

With the revival of the Hebrew language in the 19th century and with the emergence of the Yishuv, the term "Hebrew" has been applied to the Jewish people of this re-emerging society in Israel and Palestine or to the Jewish people in general.

== Etymology ==
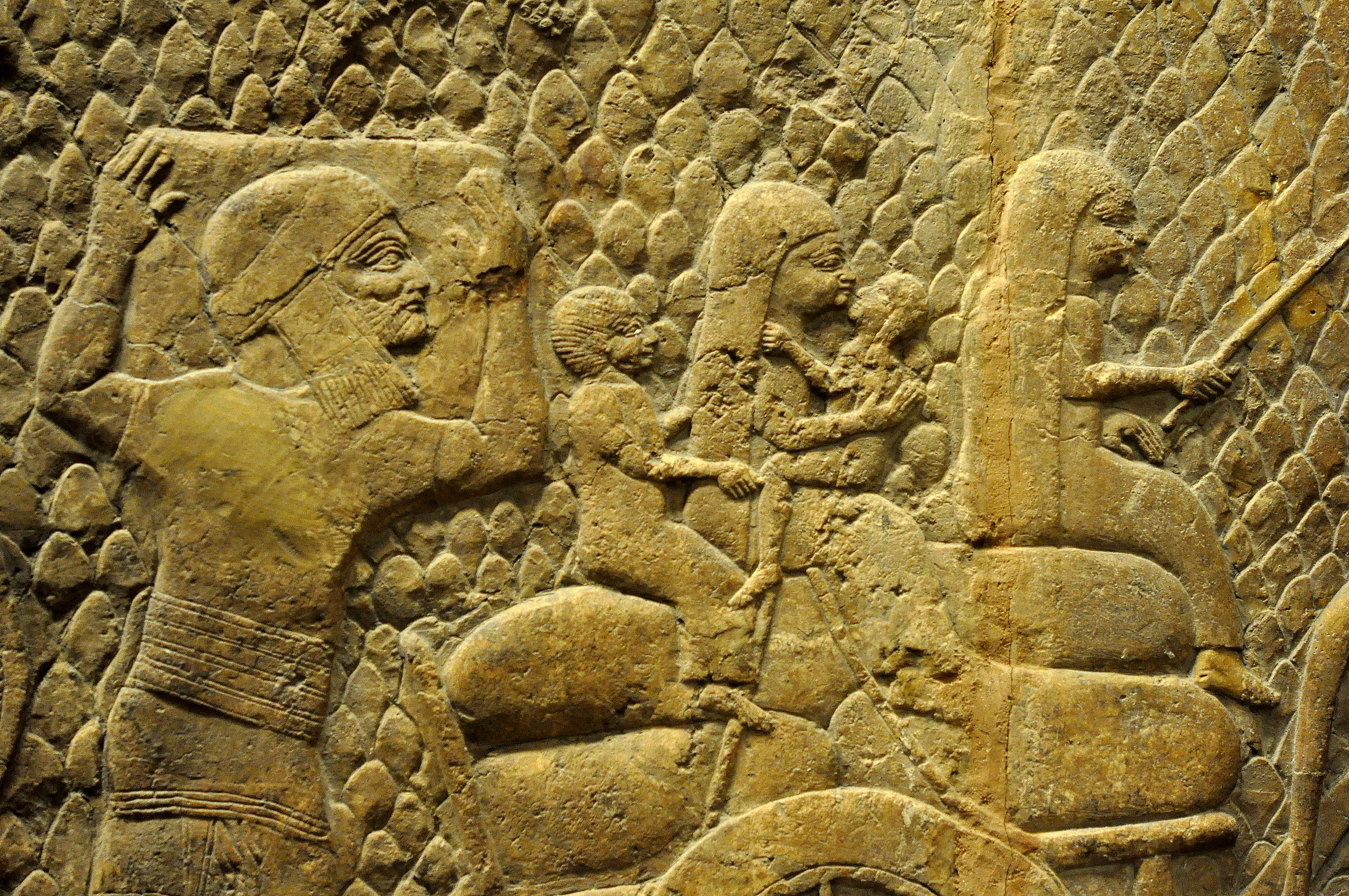
Judaean prisoners being deported into exile to other parts of the Assyrian Empire. Wall relief from the Southwest Palace at Nineveh, Mesopotamia, dated to 700–692 BCE (the Neo-Assyrian period). Currently on display at the British Museum.

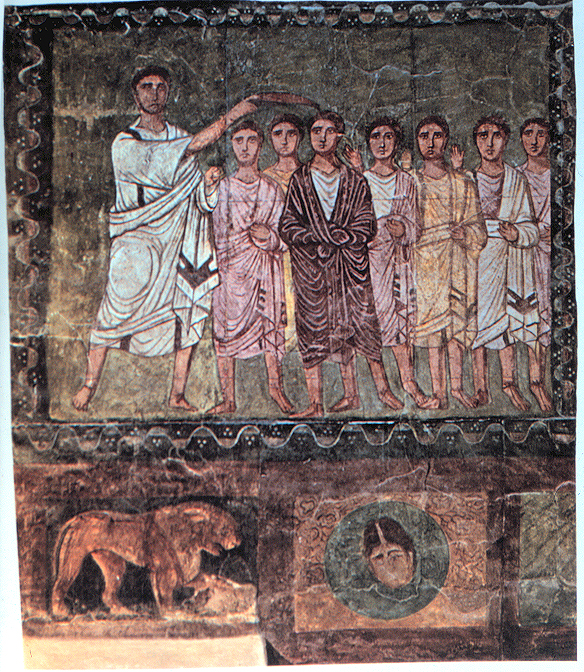
Samuel anoints David, Dura Europos, Syria, 3rd century CE.

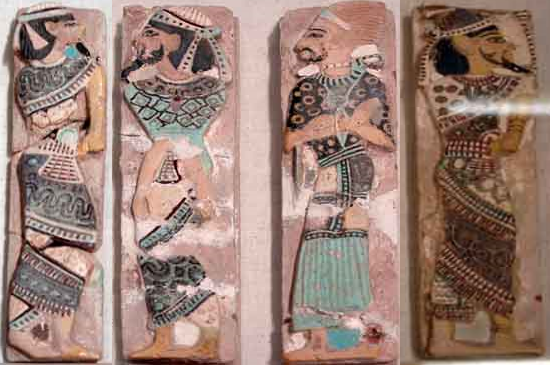
Ramesses III prisoner tiles depicting Canaanite and Shasu leaders as captives. Most archaeologists regard the Hebrews as local Canaanite refugees and possibly some Shasu settling down in the hill-country.

The biblical term Ivri (עברי; Hebrew pronunciation: [ʕivˈri]) is usually rendered as Hebrew in English (Ancient Greek: Ἑβραῖος; Latin: Hebraeus). The biblical word Ivri has the plural form Ivrim, or Ibrim. The definitive origin of the term "Hebrew" remains uncertain.

The most generally accepted hypothesis today is that the text intends ivri as the adjective (Hebrew suffix -i) formed from ever (עֵבֶר) 'beyond, across' (avar (עָבַר) 'he crossed, he traversed'), as a description of migrants 'from across the river' as the Bible describes the Hebrews. It is also supported by the 3rd century BCE Septuagint, which translates ivri to perates (περατής), a Greek word meaning "one who came across, a migrant", from perao (περάω) "to cross, to traverse", as well as some early traditional commentary. Gesenius considers it the only linguistically acceptable hypothesis. The description of peoples and nations from their location "from across the river" (often the river Euphrates, sometimes the Jordan River) was common in this region of the ancient Near-East: it appears as eber nari in Akkadian and avar nahara in Aramaic (both corresponding to Hebrew ever nahar), the Aramaic expression's use being quoted verbatim in the Bible, for example in an Aramaic letter sent to the King of Persia in the Book of Ezra or in the Book of Nehemiah, sometimes rendered as Trans-Euphrates.

Genesis 10:21 refers to Shem, the elder brother of Ham and Japheth, and thus the first-born son of Noah, as the father of the sons of Eber (עבר), which may have a similar meaning.

Some authors such as Radak and R. Nehemiah argue that Ibri denotes the descendants of the biblical patriarch Eber (Hebrew עבר), son of Shelah, a great-grandson of Noah and an ancestor of Abraham, hence the occasional anglicization Eberites. Others disagree, arguing that the Eberites and Hebrews were two different ethnicities, with the former specifically inhabiting Assyria. Nonetheless, the descent of Hebrews from Eber is acknowledged.

Since the 19th-century CE discovery of the second-millennium BCE inscriptions mentioning the Habiru, many theories have linked these to the Hebrews. Some scholars argue that the name "Hebrew" is related to the name of those semi-nomadic Habiru people recorded in Egyptian inscriptions of the 13th and 12th centuries BCE as having settled in Egypt. Other scholars rebut this, proposing that the Hebrews are mentioned in later texts of the 3rd Intermediate Period of Egypt (11th century BCE) as Shasu of Yhw, while some scholars consider these two hypotheses compatible, Ḫabiru being a generic Akkadian form parallel to Hebrew ʿivri from the Akkadian equivalent of ʿever "beyond, across" describing foreign peoples "from across the river", where the letter ayin (ע) in Hebrew corresponds to ḫ in Akkadian (as in Hebrew zeroaʿ corresponding to Akkadian zuruḫ). Alternatively, some argue that Habiru refers to a social class found in every ancient Near Eastern society, which Hebrews could be part of.

== Use as synonym for "Israelites" ==
In the Hebrew Bible, the term Hebrew is normally used by foreigners (namely, the Egyptians) when speaking about Israelites and sometimes used by Israelites when speaking of themselves to foreigners, although Saul does use the term for his fellow countrymen in 1 Samuel 13:3. In Genesis 11:16–26, Abraham (Abram) is described as a descendant of Eber; Josephus states "Eber" was the patriarch that Hebrew was named after proceeding from the Tower of Babel at the time of Eber's son Peleg, from which Hebrew would eventually become derived.

According to the Jewish Encyclopedia the terms Hebrews and Israelites usually describe the same people, stating that they were called Hebrews before the conquest of the Land of Canaan and Israelites afterwards.

Professor Nadav Na'aman and others say that the conflation of Hebrew with Israelite is rare and is only used when Israelites are "in exceptional and precarious situations, such as migrants or slaves." Professor Albert D. Friedberg similarly argues that Hebrews refer to socioeconomically disadvantaged Israelites, especially in the context of the Book of Exodus and Books of Samuel.

In Genesis 14:13, Abraham is described as Avram Ha-Ivri which translates literally as "Abram the Hebrew." Hebrew, in this context, might refer to Abraham's descent from Eber. It might also refer to Abraham's primary language or his status as a migrant from the "other side of the river".

Theologian Alexander MacLaren believes that Hebrew was a nickname for all migrants who migrated to Canaan from the other side of the Euphrates River (or the Jordan River), from the perspective of the 'long-settled' aboriginal inhabitants of Canaan.

== Use as synonym for "Jews" ==
=== Classical and late antiquity ===
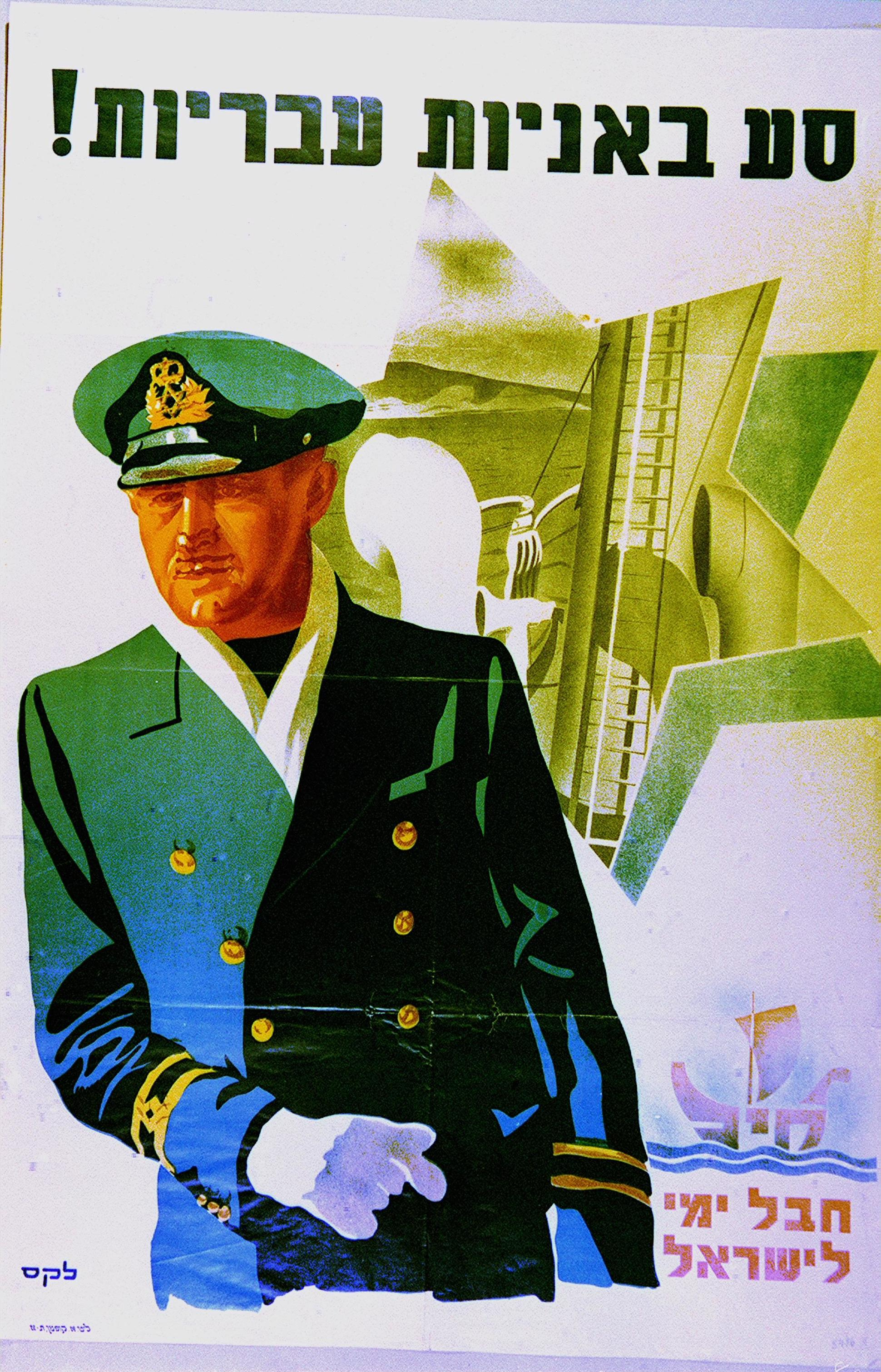
1940s poster: Sail on Hebrew ships!

"Hebrews" can be used to designate the Jewish people, who are considered to be the descendants of the Hebrew people. The Epistle to the Hebrews, one of the books of the New Testament, was probably directed at Jewish Christians.

In the 2nd century CE, the Greek geographer Pausanias used the term "Hebrews" as an alternative name for "Jews." In his work, Description of Greece, he refers to the "Hebrews beyond Syria" who rose in arms against the Roman emperor Hadrian. In another passage, while describing the Tombs of the Kings in Jerusalem, he mentions that "the Hebrews have a tomb, that of Helena." Similarly, Menander Rhetor, a rhetorician from Laodicea writing in the late 3rd century CE, referred to "the festival of the Hebrews living in Syria Palaestina" when describing the enduring tradition of Jewish pilgrimage to the site of the former Temple in Jerusalem.

Porphyry of Tyre, the 3rd-century Neoplatonist philosopher from Phoenicia, mentioned "the wisdom of the Hebrews" alongside other nations known for their wisdom, referred to Moses as "the theologian of the Hebrews," and quoted Antonius Diogenes as listing the Hebrews among the peoples Pythagoras visited and learned the science of dreams from.

=== Modern period ===
A friend of mine in Warsaw told me about a Polish journalist who visited Israel for the first time. On his return he reported with great excitement:
“You know what I’ve discovered? In Israel, too, there are Jews!”
For this Pole, Jews are people who wear a long black kaftan and a big black hat. [...]
This distinction between Israelis and Jews would not have surprised any of us 50 years ago. Before the foundation of the State of Israel, none of us spoke about a “Jewish state”. In our demonstrations we chanted: “Free Immigration! Hebrew State!”
In almost all (Note: Hebrew-language) media quotations from those days, there appear the two words “Hebrew state”, almost never “Jewish state”.

— Uri Avnery, born in 1923.

In some modern languages, including Armenian, Greek, Italian, Romanian, and many Slavic languages, the name Hebrews (with linguistic variations) is the standard ethnonym for Jews; but in many other languages in which both terms exist, it is currently considered derogatory to call Jews "Hebrews".

Among certain left-wing or liberal circles of Judaic cultural lineage, the word "Hebrew" is used as an alternatively secular description of the Jewish people (e.g., Bernard Avishai's The Hebrew Republic or left-wing wishes for a "Hebrew-Arab" joint cultural republican state). It is also used in some circles as a secular description of people of Judaic cultural lineage who practice other religions or none, including Hebrew Catholics.

==== Use in Zionism ====
Beginning in the late 19th century, the term "Hebrew" became popular among secular Zionists. In this context, the word alluded to the transformation of the Jewish people into a strong, independent, self-confident secular national group ("the New Jew") sought by classical Zionism. This use died out after the establishment of the state of Israel, when "Hebrew" was replaced with "Jew" or "Israeli".

David Ben-Gurion, the first Prime Minister of Israel, believed that the Hebrews were the indigenous inhabitants of Canaan that joined Abraham's religion, after he settled in the region. He also believed that not all Hebrews joined Jacob's family when they migrated to Egypt and later, birthed the generation of Hebrews that endured the Exodus.

== Bibliography ==
- Ancient Judaism, Max Weber, Free Press, 1967, ISBN 0-02-934130-2
- Zeitlin, Solomon (1953). "The Names Hebrew, Jew and Israel: A Historical Study". The Jewish Quarterly Review. 43 (4): 365–379. doi:10.2307/1453236. JSTOR 1453236.
- Richard Kugelman, "Hebrew, Israelite, Jew in the New Testament." In The Bridge: A Yearbook of Judaeo-Christian Studies, Vol. 1, edited by John M. Oesterreicher and Barry Ulanov, 204–224. New York: Pantheon Books, 1955.
- Harvey, Graham (2001). The True Israel: Uses of the Names Jew, Hebrew, and Israel in Ancient Jewish and Early Christian Literature. BRILL. ISBN 0-391-04119-3.
