= Secret and Explicit (The Aims and Acts of Zionists) =

1973 Soviet film

Secret and Explicit: The Aims and Acts of Zionists
- Тайное и Явное: Цели и деяния сионистов
- Directed by: Boris Leonidovich Karpov
- Written by: Dmitry Anatolyevich Zhukov
- Cinematography: A.Kiselev
- Production company: Central Studio for Documentary Film
- Release date: 1973
- Running time: 89 minutes
- Country: USSR
- Language: Russian

Secret and Explicit (Russian title: Тайное и Явное) is a Soviet propaganda film released in 1973. The film reused footage from Der Ewige Jude (The Eternal Jew), a 1940 antisemitic Nazi propaganda film.

== Plot ==
The film begins at a demonstration in at the Soviet Embassy in London. A voice-over claims the footage shows a "petty Zionist agent ... recruited and paid 5 pounds to each of the demonstrators from the Zionist treasury." In reality, the footage is of a 1972 demonstration in front of the embassy on behalf of the pregnant Lyudmila Prussakova, whose petition to emigrate to Israel had been repeatedly denied. The demonstration, organized by British actresses Hayley Mills and Barbara Oberman, was triggered by the Bernard Levin's Times column, which reported on Prussakova's state.

The film reflected the anti-Zionist ideology prevalent in Soviet propaganda. In particular, the film accuses Zionism of cooperation with Nazi Germany during the Holocaust and on the killing of the indigenous peoples in the Soviet Union.

== Criticism ==
The World War II cameraman Leonid Kogan wrote in a letter addressed to Leonid Brezhnev that "the film uses material from the Nazi anti-Semitic films" and it forms the impression that "Zionism and Jews are one and the same." Kogan called the film Black Hundreds inspired and expressed surprise that such a work could appear within the framework of the Central Studio for Documentary Film studio.

Doctor of Art History Valery Fomin found out that the film was commissioned by the ideological department of the CPSU Central Committee in accordance with the recommendations on strengthening the ideological struggle against Zionism and was supervised in the process of creation. A famous film critic Miron Chernenko wrote that "the authors and consultants clearly broke a certain line, behind which state anti-Semitism came into conflict with the so-called "proletarian internationalism." Chernenko calls the film the top of the "rabid" anti-Zionist "but actually anti-Semitic propaganda" that unfolded in the USSR after the end of the Six-Day War.

Nikolai Mitrokhin, the candidate of historical sciences, regarded the film as "pseudo-documentary" and connects it with the conspiracy theory, according to which Jews are allegedly behind all key events of the 20th century.
