= Militia Act of 1862 =

Military draft legislation of the American Civil War

- Long title: An Act to amend the Act calling forth the Militia to execute the Laws of the Union, suppress Insurrections, and repel Invasions, approved February twenty-eight, seventeen hundred and ninety-five, and the Acts amendatory thereof, and for other Purposes.
- Enacted by: the 37th United States Congress
- Effective: July 17, 1862

Citations
- Statutes at Large: 12 Stat. 597

Legislative history
- Introduced in the Senate as S. 384 by Henry Wilson (R–MA) on July 8, 1862; Passed the Senate on July 15, 1862 (28-9); Passed the House on July 16, 1862 (30-77); Signed into law by President Abraham Lincoln on July 17, 1862

Major amendments
- 1. Militia Act of 1792, Chapter 28; 2. Militia Act of 1792, Chapter 33

The Militia Act of 1862 (12 Stat. 597, enacted July 17, 1862) was an Act of the 37th United States Congress, during the American Civil War, that authorized a militia draft within a state when the state could not meet its quota with volunteers. The Act, for the first time, also allowed African Americans to serve in the militias as soldiers and war laborers. Previous to it, since the Militia Acts of 1792, only white male citizens were permitted to participate in the militias.

The act was praised by many abolitionists as a first step toward equality, because it stipulated that black recruits could be soldiers or manual laborers. However, the Act enacted discrimination in pay and other areas. It provided that most black soldiers were to receive $10 a month, with a $3 reduction for clothing, which was almost half as was received by white soldiers who received $13. Historian Eric Foner posits that the difference in pay stemmed from the fact that the legislation envisioned black soldiers mainly as military laborers, freeing up white soldiers for combat. Many regiments struggled for equal pay, some refusing any money until June 15, 1864, when Congress removed that portion of the Militia Act and granted equal pay for all black soldiers.

In 1863, when voluntary enlistment was declining under the Act's state-administered system, Congress passed the Enrollment Act. This was the first genuine national conscription law and required the enrollment of every able-bodied male citizen and immigrants between ages 20 and 45 who had filed for citizenship.

== Background ==
By the summer of 1862, African American involvement in the Civil War was the center of a nationwide debate. Although the U.S. War Department had refused to accept black army volunteers since the start of the war, Union members were beginning to consider the benefits of having their support. While regarding the nationwide indecision, Congress had the ultimate power to decide whether people of African descent would participate in the Civil War as laborers and/or soldiers.

The 37th Congress neither leaned heavily towards the enrollment of black volunteers, nor towards their continued blockage. While the idea to use African Americans as laborers was generally accepted in Congress, the employment of black soldiers was not. Therefore, supporters in Congress of black combatants were proposing one of the most important developments of the war.

Observing the racial discrimination and strong opposition among ranks of military officers, Congress began to fear that black involvement would only prolong the war. However, those in support of black involvement argued that the contribution of more soldier was advantageous to the Army of the Potomac regardless of their race. The Militia Act of 1862 consequently established the legality of using black soldiers by justifying them as a war necessity. Black recruits' net salary was established at $7 per month in contrast to the $13 salary that white soldiers received.

=== Precedent and constitutional authority ===
Under Section 8 of Article 1 of the Constitution, Congress had the power to determine the makeup of militias. It allowed Congress "[t]o raise and support armies" and "[t]o provide for organizing, arming, and disciplining the militia, and for governing such part of them as may be employed in their service of the United States."

Virginia Senator John S. Carlile was among those opposed the Militia Act, arguing that Congress "has no power to determine who shall compose the militia of a State in this Union". Republican Representative Jacob Collamer of Vermont separately noted that the 1792 Congress had "passed an act for organizing the militia, and confined it to white people." This Militia Act of 1792 would have to be overridden by a new militia act to open military service to those of African descent.

Congress could also decide to confiscate Confederate slaves for war efforts. When assigned to the position of War Department Solicitor in November 1862, Attorney William Whiting confirmed in War Powers Under the Constitution of the United States that "Congress may interfere with slavery by calling upon the slaves, as subjects, to enter the military service." Whiting asserted that slavery was a military target because it enabled the Confederacy to carry on "war against the Union" and forced "three million of loyal subjects owned by rebel masters to act as if they were traitors." Allen Guelzo argues in his research that Abraham Lincoln and his Republican Congressmen "rely hugely on Whiting's book" and use it to justify his actions "both in terms of emancipation and black recruitment." Whiting's declaration gave Congress power to enforce a militia policy that included the black race as equal recruits.

== Legislative history ==
=== Attitude of Congress ===
The 37th Congress was divided in their stance on the enrollment of black volunteers, with some in the Republican Party (who held a majority in both chambers) arguing that they should not be integrated with white soldiers. However, the idea to use African Americans as laborers was generally accepted. Debate focused on the intensity of the labor African Americans would perform. At the time, affluent Confederates were already taking advantage of their slaves by bringing "body servants" that would prepare food, build trenches, construct shelters, and clean clothes at campsites. Head of the Militia Committee, Republican Senator Preston King commented, for example, that "nobody would, probably, object to their cooking." Conversely, Senator Garrett Davis of Kentucky argued that only labor-intensive jobs such as digging canals were acceptable for African Americans.

Therefore, those of the 37th Congress in support of black combatants were proposing one of the most important developments of the war. If they were to convince their counterparts of the benefits to using black soldiers during the Second Session of 1862, blacks would be involved in combat and labor positions for the first time since 1792. Furthermore, they would be bestowing an opportunity for slaves everywhere to prove themselves worthy of respect and equality on the battlefield. For that reason, abolitionist Frederick Douglass strongly urged the President and Congress in 1861 to "[l]et the slaves and free colored people be called into service and formed into a liberating army, to march into the South and raise the banner of Emancipation." Although lasting only seven days, July 9 to 16, the debate concerning the proposition of black soldier participation and its result brought blacks so much closer to earning their freedom.

Given the opportunity to alter the status of many African Americans, a few members of Congress feared that the next militia act would change the purpose of the war. Believing in Lincoln's insistence, exhibited in his 1862 letter to editor Horace Greeley of the New-York Tribune, that the "paramount object in this struggle is to save the Union, and is not either to save or to destroy slavery," they did not wish to see the war evolve into something more than the restoration of the Union. Republican Representative John P. Hale of New Hampshire voiced on July 9 at a Congressional session, "This war ought to be carried on without any regard at all to the subject of slavery or slaves. It out to preserve a free government for free people." Frustrated with the Congressional focus on black soldiers, Democratic Senator Willard Saulsbury of Delaware thought similarly: "But no sooner are we engaged in civil war ... than an attempt is made on every occasion to change the character of the war, and to elevate the miserable nigger, not only to political rights, but to put him in the Army, and to put him in your Navy."

The racism that deemed blacks incapable of being skillful soldiers echoed in Congress. Although acknowledging blacks' competence with household chores, "[a] goodly number of Northerners agreed with Southerners that the black was a biologically inferior being and could not be trusted with important military responsibilities." Consequently, the whole race was loudly criticized as being lazy, ambivalent, and cowardly.

A generation of men had grown up disrespecting persons of African descent and in awe of slavery that devalued the abilities of blacks. Historian Allen C. Guelzo finds that because slavery encourages "submission, it encourages docility, and it encourages stupidity"- all characteristics that soldiers must not possess, several officers believed that former slaves would be poor soldiers, particularly in battle. For example, Lieutenant Colonel Charles Francis Adams of the Massachusetts's cavalry wrote to his brother in the summer of 1862, sharing his thoughts that "[a]t best [a black man] could perform fatigue duty" because "he has not the mental vigor and energy" to do more. And while he disbelieved in the black race's competence, others had good reason to doubt the white men's acceptance of integration.

Observing the racial discrimination and strong opposition among ranks of military officers, Congress began to fear that black involvement would only prolong the war. Democratic Senator of Missouri John B. Henderson asserted that because white soldiers do not "want to fight by side with the nigger.... The rebellion will never end if they are used. I do not believe they will help you any." Henderson voiced the opinion that black and white cooperation in the war was not possible. Seconding his fellow Senator, Republican James W. Grimes of Iowa, who wished to see blacks fighting, regretfully informed those at the Congressional debate, "I believe for that every good soldier you would get among them, you will lose a white man, who will be driven off by his prejudices." And even though Lincoln wished to see slaves free, he said the same thing in the late winter of 1862: "To arm the negroes, would turn 50,000 bayonets from the loyal Border States against us that were for us." Although he uses kinder words, Lincoln, too, implies that the racist attitudes have the power to rip the Union apart even more.

Meanwhile, the overwhelming argument from those in support of black involvement, unlike those who believed in black inadequacy was that the contribution of more soldiers was then extremely advantageous to the Army of the Potomac, regardless of their skin color. In the spring of 1862, the Potomac Army "had suffered a series of military defeats, which struck a sharp blow at Northern morale." The Union army was experiencing a decline in volunteers when it needed them most.

At the same time, the numbers of African American civilian refugees were not being used to the Union's best advantage. The majority was not employed even though the Union commanders knew from working with refugees on supply lines and personal service since 1861 how the potential burden of refugees and former slaves could be turned into an asset. With the numbers of former slaves escalating in contrast to the decreasing supply of white volunteers, a widespread belief of supporters was that "the only available men that [the Potomac] could bring into the Union ranks were the slaves."

Despite their unfavorable role in American history, blacks had already proven to be capable. Besides their role in the American Revolution and the War of 1812, Senator King reminded Congress of their participation in the Union Navy since the beginning of the Civil War: "They are engaged in the Navy, and have always been, to some extent". Unlike the Union Army, the Navy had always accepted blacks in the enlisted ranks; by the summer of 1862, a fifth of the Navy's workers were colored. Affluent Confederates, too, were taking advantage of the black race. Reflecting, Senator John Sherman lectured, "Senators seem to think they are not fit for soldiers. In the South rebels fight side by side with them. In the South the Negroes do the labors of the camp. They do all the hard work. Why shall we not avail ourselves of their serviced to perform the same class of duties for us?"

With a purpose to take away from the Confederacy and also to help the Union, making a black from enemy lines a soldier seemed like a logical move. The Harper's Weekly journal issued in the North, published a story titled "Negro Troops" on June 20 that illustrated how supporters saw endless possibilities with the use of black soldiers: "Indeed there is no limit to the supply of troops which may be drawn from this source." Furthermore, Professor of History at University of North Carolina Dr. John David Smith contends, "as the war dragged on, Lincoln and most white Northerners slowly came to the same conclusion" that "Americans of African descent would become an invaluable resource."

Notably worried at the prospect of more Union losses, members of Congress became convinced that African American soldier recruitment was necessary. Democratic Senator Henry Mower Rice of Minnesota said on July 9 he was willing "to vote for any measure to end [Union losses]." Warning that the bill and black involvement were war necessities, Sherman agreed, "The time has arrived that when, in my judgment, the military authorities should be compelled to use all the physical force of this country." The greatest authority on the matter, due to his position of chairman on Congress' Militia Committee, Senator Robert Wilson, shared his valued opinion on July 9: "This bill contemplates calling out the militia in case we fail to obtain the number of men required by the present system of volunteering ... I believe the bill, therefore, to be necessary." When Senator Collamer asked him once more a day later, on July 10, Wilson reiterated his position: "It is necessary." And with that said, black soldier participation was established and the debate progressed to discuss pay rate, clothing, and freedom.

In the end, the need for combat labor was Congress' ultimate prompt for the legislation. Civil War historian James M. McPherson confirms in one of his books, Battle Cry of Freedom, "Helping blacks to earn citizenship was not the main motive for the push of their enrollment in the upcoming bill." Instead, the fear of losing the Civil War convinced Congress and Union citizens to take advantage of the willing service.

=== Debate ===
After constant debate from July 5 to July 16, 1862, Congress' bill reflected the desires of black soldier supporters. By the 9th, Republican Grimes proposed the militia act to read: "[t]he President of the United States shall have full power and authority to organize [any male of any race] into battalions, regiments, brigades, and divisions." Such a statement in the passage would clearly determine the role of blacks in the war as soldiers. Responding with great support from Sherman and Saulsbury, King offered the following corrections: The president can receive into service, "for the purpose of constructing entrenchments, or performing camp service, or any other labor, or any war service for which they may be found competent, persons of African descent." Accepted, the amendment to the act did not specify the roles of African Americans, but at the same time, it did not limit them to menial labors or restrict them to stay off the battlefield.

==== Unequal pay ====
Pay for African American recruits was an insignificant issue in Congress and appeared as an issue of discussion only three times during the course of July 9 to July 14. Therefore, Whiting believes that Congress did not invest heavily into the last passage of the act. Sherman led the effort to determine pay of black recruits because he thought the "compensation ought not to be left to the quartermasters" because if "it be left open, it will be left in a great measure to quartermasters, and there will be different rules in regard to pay, and difficulties may occur." King, too, suggested that the defined pay be inserted into the bill. After hearing Sherman's agreement, "[t]he amendment to the amendment was agreed to."

Determining the pay was a different issue. Although by July 14, the bill stated: persons of "African descent, who shall be employed, who are to receive ten dollars per month and one ration", King was proposing to reduce the set rate even more. King's suggestion was to rid the passage "And [African Americans] shall be fed, clothed and paid such compensation" and instead include that "three dollars of which monthly pay may be in clothing." Therefore, three dollars would be deducted from their monthly salary and the black's salary was reduced to $7, in comparison to the significantly raised $13 that white soldiers received.

Justification for the unequal pay has been that Congress intended African Americans to be employed only as laborers, and not soldiers. When asked, Professor Harry Bradshaw Matthews of Hartwick College is certain that the Militia Act was made under the impression blacks would be used only as laborers. James Oakes, author of The Radical and the Republican, alongside Professor John David Smith of University of North Carolina, is in agreement with Matthews. Outlining their major argument, Smith argues, "framers have assumed- erroneously – that African Americans who joined the army would serve not as soldiers but as laborers." Historian Eric Foner makes the same claim on page 214 of The Fiery Trial.

Indeed, the 37th Congress had focused on African American employment only as laborers during the start of their Second Session. Then, "there were some people who wanted black soldiers only to serve in a supporting role" who, like Democratic Senator Davis, were able to voice their opinion. In fact, those who have not read the congressional records documented in the Congressional Globe can argue that the act appears to be a compromise that supported only the use of African American laborers, with the established pay of $7, respectively consistent with the reduced salary of support troops receiving less than combat troops.

However, the framers of the act did not assume that blacks would help out only as laborers. Research into the Congressional Globe proves that argument to be completely true. After combing through the political document, Solicitor Whiting confirmed: "A review of the remarks made by the members of the Senate and House, including those of the persons who introduced and proposed these acts above cited, will show how earnest was the contest which resulted in introducing colored soldiers into our military service." Therefore, Ira Berlin, at the University of Maryland, correctly contends that Congress was ready to see African Americans fighting as soldiers.

When finally polished and issued on July 17, the Militia Act of 1862 established the legality of black soldiers. Fulfilling its purpose to override the Militia Act of 1792, it was "[a]n Act to amend the Act calling forth the militia to execute the laws of the Union, suppress insurrection, and rebel invasions, approved February 28, 1792", and a "Proposed Reorganization of State Troops." Under Section 12, the President could now "receive [blacks] into the service of the United States, for the purpose of constructing trenches, or performing camp service or any other labor, or any military or naval service for which they may be found competent," including soldier duty.

Furthermore, any African American employed for warfare would receive freedom for himself and his family. Section 13 outlined that by stating "any man or boy of African descent" who "shall render such service as is provided for in this act, he, his mother and his wife and children, shall forever thereafter be free."

== Second Confiscation Act and emancipation ==
Alongside the Militia Act, the Confiscation Act of 1862 issued on July 17 declared all slaves belonging to a rebel were free. Given the power to confiscate slaves, Congress proclaimed: "That every person who shall hereafter commit the crime of treason against the United States, and shall be adjudged guilty thereof, shall suffer death, and all his slaves, if any, shall be declared and made free." Following the Confiscation Act of 1861, The Second Confiscation Act stripped any persons in rebellion of any claim to their slaves and made the former slaves free. In different ways the two acts employed black manpower.

Introducing the use of contracted black workers into the Civil War, the Militia Act of 1862 marked the war's transformation to preserve the Union into a reconstruction to create new order. Indeed, "the participation of the black soldier was perhaps the most revolutionary feature of the Civil War." For the first time during the Civil War Union members were openly admitting the value of African American support in Congress. Congress had finally settled the question "whether the United States shall employ the labor of a race of men whose interests, whose sympathies, whose whole hearts are with the loyal people of the United States in suppressing this rebellion."

By its issue date, the general public of the Union accepted act's necessity. McPherson's studies show that as the "[n]orthern public opinion was being gradually converted by the pressures of events," members of Congress came to more clearly support the move to use black soldiers. Professor of History at Yale David W. Blight, too, believes that "throughout the summer of 1862, events rapidly made northern public opinion more favorable to the use of black troops." Lincoln became ready to exercise the power bestowed in him to "employ as many persons of African descent as he may deem necessary." "I have no hesitation," he declared in his message to Congress, "and I am ready to say now, I think it is proper for our military commanders to employ as laborers as many persons of African descent as can be used to advantage."co

Yet despite their new welcome into the Potomac Army, blacks were left to grapple with the still-present discrimination throughout the nation. With the establishment of unequal pay in the Militia Act, a contradiction formed between the opportunity for African-Americans to earn equal rights and the degrading offer of lessened pay. Therefore, the act's appearance has deceived many historians and has left the document not well understood.

The Militia Act of 1862 draws attention to the legalities involved in wartime politics. Perhaps Professor Herman Belz's work, Abraham Lincoln, Constitutionalism, and Equal Rights in the Civil War Era, clarifies the "historical perspective" best by focusing on "the additional exigencies of law, politics, and wartime circumstances." The Militia Act was a product of the legislative branch- created as a war necessity to allow the army black soldier recruits. Yet whether Congress was right to assume that the North could not have won the war as soon as it did- or at all- without black assistance is still up for discussion.

== Open Chaplaincy ==
Section 9 of the act eliminated the requirement that chaplains be Christian by changing the wording from "of a Christian denomination" to "of a religious society". This was especially helpful to Jews and resulted in the appointment of the Rev. Jacob Frankel of Congregation Rodeph Shalom (Philadelphia) as the first Jewish chaplain on September 18, 1862.

Previous to the passing of the Militia Act of 1862 all military chaplains were required to be an ordained Christian minister or clergy, this requirement originates from the establishment of chaplains within the Continental Army who served as officers both with and without pay. Catholics were not allowed to become military officers within the chaplaincy role until the Mexican–American War.

The reason for the change in wording was due to the appointment of Captain Michael Allen, the regimental chaplain of the 5th Pennsylvania Cavalry Regiment. Allen was a Jew but not an ordained minister, nor a Rabbi, regardless Allen provided non-denominational services to the regiment which was a mix of Christians and Jews. The appointment of a non-Christian as a chaplain was eventually discovered by the YMCA and reported to the Adjutant General of the Army George D. Ruggles. The resulting pressure from the Adjutant General along with various Christian newspapers resulted in Allen's resignation from the Union Army.

Rabbi Arnold Fischel and the Board of Delegates of American Israelites eventually lobbied President Lincoln to include Jews in the Union Army's broader chaplaincy which was successful and included in the passing of the act. According to Karen Abbott a total of three people served as Rabbi's during the war: Jacob Frankel of Philadelphia, Bernhard Gotthelf of Louisville, Kentucky, and Ferdinand Sarner of Rochester, New York. Sarner was the only Rabbi of the three to serve in combat at the Battle of Gettysburg with the 54th New York Infantry Regiment, an ethnic German regiment.

== Provisions ==
CHAP. CCI.–An Act to amend the Act calling forth the Militia to execute the Laws of the Union, suppress Insurrections, and repel Invasions, approved February twenty-eight, seventeen hundred and ninety-five, and the Acts amendatory thereof, and for other Purposes. ....

SEC. 12. And be it further enacted, That the President be, and he is hereby, authorized to receive into the service of the United States, for the purpose of constructing intrenchments, or performing camp service or any other labor, or any military or naval service for which they may be found competent, persons of African descent, and such persons shall be enrolled and organized under such regulations, not inconsistent with the Constitution and laws, as the President may prescribe.

SEC. 13. And be it further enacted, That when any man or boy of African descent, who by the laws of any State shall owe service or labor to any person who, during the present rebellion, has levied war or has borne arms against the United States, or adhered to their enemies by giving them aid and comfort, shall render any such service as is provided for in this act, he, his mother and his wife and children, shall forever thereafter be free, any law, usage, or custom whatsoever to the contrary notwithstanding: Provided, That the mother, wife and children of such man or boy of African descent shall not be made free by the operation of this act except where such mother, wife or children owe service or labor to some person who, during the present rebellion, has borne arms against the United States or adhered to their enemies by giving them aid and comfort.

SEC. 14. And be it further enacted, That the expenses incurred to carry this act into effect shall be paid out of the general appropriation for the army and volunteers.

SEC. 15. And be it further enacted, That all persons who have been or shall be hereafter enrolled in the service of the United States under this act shall receive the pay and rations now allowed by law to soldiers, according to their respective grades: Provided, That persons of African descent, who under this law shall be employed, shall receive ten dollars per month and one ration, three dollars of which monthly pay may be in clothing.

APPROVED, July 17, 1862

== See also ==
- Militia Act of 1792
- Militia Act of 1795
- Militia Act of 1903
- Racial discrimination against African-Americans in the U.S. Military
