= 1862 Buffalo riot =

Civil disturbance at immigrant workers strike at Buffalo, New York

The Buffalo Riot of 1862 was a civil disturbance on the afternoon of August 12, 1862, by Irish and German stevedores against local dock bosses, and more broadly, the federal government. The rioters, frustrated by low wages and the federal government's call for a militia draft, demanded increased pay and prevented others from working at the old rates. They initially overpowered police, seriously injuring the chief of police and other officers, but were forced to surrender after police opened fire, wounding two. Although the mayor had called for the New York State Militia, police arrested the ringleaders before the militia was needed.

A central cause of the riot was the Militia Act of 1862, Republican-sponsored legislation in July of that year which expanded President Abraham Lincoln's wartime powers. The bill gave Lincoln the authority to call for a draft of militia men in states with low volunteer numbers, and on August 4, Lincoln called for a draft of 300,000 of these men for nine months' service. New York State eventually furnished enough volunteers and avoided the draft altogether, but the mere possibility of a draft angered Buffalo's immigrant stevedores.

Two days after Lincoln's call for a draft, the Buffalo Morning Express reported that men "talked of nothing else, and many faces wore an anxious and troubled expression, bearing witness to the unpleasantness of the idea of shouldering a musket under compulsion." By August 12, Buffalo's stevedores were riled up.They gathered at a local christian churches for recruitment. Meeting at the Western Transportation Company's dock on the Erie Basin, more than two hundred local Irish and German dockworkers gathered to listen to a German speaker, who was standing on a pile of lumber. The speaker criticized Yankees who "had conspired against the German, Irish and Scotch residents of the country, to force them into the army." The riot was eventually quelled by Buffalo Police, and ended with some fourteen rioters jailed.
