= Marcus Jastrow =

Prussian–American rabbi and lexicographer (1829–1903)

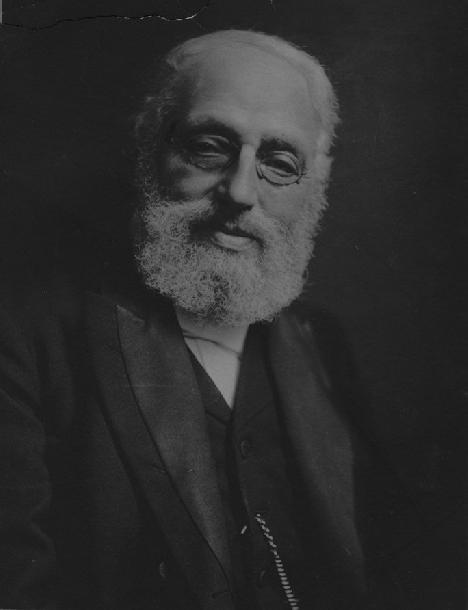

Personal life
- Born: June 5, 1829 Rogasen, Grand Duchy of Posen, Prussia (now Poland)
- Died: October 13, 1903 (aged 74) Germantown, Philadelphia, Pennsylvania, U.S.
- Education: University of Halle

Religious life
- Religion: Judaism
- Denomination: Orthodox

Jewish leader
- Synagogue: Congregation Rodeph Shalom
- Organisation: University of Pennsylvania

Marcus Jastrow (June 5, 1829 – October 13, 1903) was a Prussian-born American Orthodox Jewish rabbi, lexicographer, and renowned Talmudic scholar.

Jastrow was born in Rogasen in the Grand Duchy of Posen, Prussia. After receiving his semikhah (rabbinical ordination), Doctorate of Philosophy (Ph.D.), and Doctorate of Letters (D.Litt.), he became the rabbi of the then-Orthodox Congregation Rodeph Shalom in Philadelphia, Pennsylvania in 1866 at the age of thirty-seven. In 1886, he began publishing his magnum opus, the popular and comprehensive Dictionary of the Targumim, Talmud Bavli, Talmud Yerushlami, and Midrashic Literature, in pamphlet form (1886–1903). It was finally completed and published in two-volume form in 1903, and has since become a popular resource for students of the Talmud.

In the preface to this masterpiece, Jastrow sharply criticized those linguists and etymological scholars who claimed that obscure terms in Talmudic literature are primarily derived from Koine Greek. Jastrow held that Greek influence on Jewish Babylonian Aramaic was minimal, and that most obscure terms could be much more simply traced to Hebrew origins. Jastrow was also responsible for most Talmud-related articles in The Jewish Encyclopedia (1906).

== Biography ==
Marcus Jastrow was the fifth child of Abraham Jastrow and Yetta (Henrietta) Rolle. Until 1840, he was privately educated. In 1844 he entered the third-year class of the Friedrich Wilhelm Gymnasium at Posen, graduating in 1852. From there he went to study at the University of Halle, where he graduated in 1855, receiving the degree of doctor of philosophy. In the meantime he continued his Jewish studies and in 1853, at the age of 24, he received his semikhah from Rabbi Moses Feilchenfeld in Rogasen and later, in 1857, from Rabbi Wolf Landau in Dresden. Jastrow taught briefly at Orthodox Jewish schools in Berlin, first at a school by David Rosen, then at Michael Sachs' school.

=== Joins in Polish revolution ===
In 1858, recommended by Heinrich Graetz, Jastrow moved again as rabbi to the leading Orthodox congregation in Warsaw, the private "German synagogue" on Daniłowiczowska Street, and threw himself into the study of the Polish language and Polish conditions. By February 27, 1861, national feeling had risen so high in Poland that the government called out the military; five victims fell in the Krakowskie Przedmieście, Warsaw, and their burial and the memorial service were turned into patriotic demonstrations, in which, for the first time, Jews in Poland participated as a community.

Though it was the Shabbat, three rabbis, including Jastrow, joined the funeral procession; at the memorial service in his synagogue, also on a Sabbath, Jastrow preached his first Polish sermon, which aroused such great enthusiasm that on Sunday his auditors reassembled and took it down at his dictation. Circumventing the censor, they distributed ten thousand manuscript copies within a week.

Although it was controversial at the time, delivering a sermon in Polish does not violate any Orthodox Jewish restriction, nor does following a funeral procession on foot on the Sabbat. Today most Orthodox rabbis give lectures in their local vernacular.

On various pretexts, the three rabbis were arrested (November 10, 1861) and incarcerated in the Warsaw Citadel. For 23 days Jastrow was kept in solitary confinement; for 72 days he shared the cell of Dow Ber Meisels. His release came on February 12, 1862, when, being a Prussian subject, he was sent across the frontier. During his imprisonment, he had been required to answer in writing three questions concerning the relation of the Jews to the Polish Christians in their opposition to the government.

=== Returns to Warsaw ===
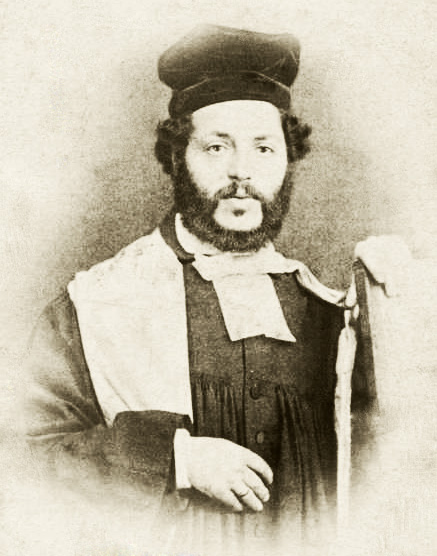
Portrait of Marcus Jastrow as Rabbi of Worms, c. 1864–1868

Broken in health, Jastrow, with his family, spent the spring and summer of 1862 in Breslau, Berlin, and Dresden; in the autumn he accepted a call from the Jewish community in Mannheim. A few weeks later, Nov., 1862, the order for his expulsion was revoked, and gave occasion for a controversy between the congregation at Warsaw (which had continued his salary until he went to Mannheim) and that of Mannheim; at Jastrow's request the latter released him. A few months after his return to Warsaw (Jan. 1863) the revolution broke out. During its progress, and while Jastrow was traveling, his Prussian passport was canceled, and he was not permitted to return to Warsaw.

The literary results of his Polish period are: Die Lage der Juden in Polen (anonymous; Hamburg, 1859); Kazania Polskie, a volume of Polish sermons (Posen, 1863); Die Vorläufer des Polnischen Aufstandes (anonymous; Hamburg, 1864). He probably had a considerable share in the production of Beleuchtung eines Ministeriellen Gutachtens (Hamburg, 1859 [?]). In July, 1864, Jastrow accepted a call to Worms as district rabbi, and while there he produced Vier Jahrhunderte aus der Gesch. der Juden von der Zerstörung des Ersten Tempels bis zur Makkabäischen Tempelweihe (Heidelberg, 1865).

=== Aids organization of American Jews ===
In the autumn of 1866 he went to Philadelphia as rabbi of the Ashkenazi congregation Rodeph Shalom, with which he was connected until his death, remaining in active service until 1892 and identifying himself with the interests of the Jewish community.

The problem under discussion at the time was organization, urged in the East by the Orthodox Isaac Leeser and in the West by the Reform Isaac Mayer Wise. It dealt with higher education, representation, and the regulation of liturgical changes and Jastrow's personality became a factor in its solution. When, through the exertions of Leeser, the Maimonides College, the first rabbinical college in the United States, was opened at Philadelphia in October 1867, Jastrow occupied the chair of religious philosophy and Jewish history, and later also of exegesis; he was identified with the college until it closed its doors four years later. He supported the plan of organizing the Board of Delegates of Civil and Religious Rights and, under its auspices, the Jewish Publication Society (1873). However, his main activity from 1867 to 1871 was directed toward combating the tendencies expressed in the resolutions of the rabbinical conferences of 1869 and 1871. His opposition to them found expression in a series of polemical articles published in The Hebrew Leader and The Jewish Times.

To the same period belongs his collaboration with the leading rabbi in Baltimore, Benjamin Szold, in the revision of the latter's siddur (Seder Abodat Yisrael) and of Hirsch Edelmann's home siddur, Hegyon Leb or "Landshuth's Prayer-Book", and his translation of the same siddurim into English. In his congregation, Jastrow's influence effected consolidation and growth; in the Jewish community, he participated in the formation and reorganization of societies.

In 1876 Jastrow fell severely ill, and for some years his public activities were limited by his poor health, which necessitated a stay in the south of Europe. During this period of withdrawal, he fully matured the plans for his great work, A Dictionary of the Targumim, the Talmud Babli and Yerushalmi, and the Midrashic Literature (London and New York, 1886–1903). When the dictionary was approaching completion in manuscript (1895), the Jewish Publication Society of America was about to begin work on its projected new translation of the Bible into English, and Jastrow was entrusted with the chief editorship. At the time of his death, the translation of more than half the books of the Bible had been revised by him.

In addition to these two great undertakings, he was a member of the Publication Committee of the Jewish Publication Society from the time of its establishment, and was connected with The Jewish Encyclopedia as editor of the department of the Talmud; he took a prominent part in the proceedings of the Jewish Ministers' Association, held a seat in the central board of the Alliance Israélite Universelle in Paris, was on the committee of the Mekitze Nirdamim, was one of the vice-presidents of the American Federation of Zionists, and was active in relieving the needs, material and intellectual, of the Russian immigrants.

Jastrow initially allowed his congregation to join the Reform Union of American Hebrew Congregations. After the Reform movement united around the radical "Pittsburgh Platform" in 1885, Jastrow, along with many other rabbis of the time, withdrew his congregation's membership.

In 1886, together with Rabbi Henry Pereira Mendes, founder of the Orthodox Union, he helped Rabbi Sabato Morais establish the Jewish Theological Seminary of America. It was only in 1913, ten years after Jastrow's death, that the next generation of management altered the Orthodox principles of the school, and from them emerged Conservative Judaism.

He was removed by his congregation in September 1892 in favor of the Reform-ordained Henry Berkowitz. Jastrow attributed this decision to the growing popularity of radical reforms and the congregation's desire to compete for membership with the more liberal synagogues. In his farewell speech, he chastised his congregation, insisting that "he who does not feel himself in unison with the tenets of Israel's religion as they have been transmitted from generation to generation, [is] not justified in occupying a Jewish pulpit established for the proclamation of Jewish doctrines." He made several efforts to prevent the introduction of certain reforms, including articles in the public press. In 1894, the Board felt the necessity to write him to ask him to refrain from publishing articles that might create strife in the congregation. He served as rabbi emeritus of the congregation until he died in 1903 on the Jewish holiday of Shemini Atzeret in Germantown, Philadelphia.

In 1900, the University of Pennsylvania conferred upon him the doctorate of literature. Jastrow's library was donated to the University of Pennsylvania after his death.

Besides the journals previously mentioned, articles of his appear in the Revue des Études Juives; Frankel's Monatsschrift; Berliner's Magazin für die Wissenschaft des Judenthums; Sippurim; Journal of Biblical Literature; Hebraica; Young Israel; Libanon; "Jewish Record"; Jewish Messenger; American Hebrew; Jewish Exponent; etc.

== Religious views ==
Along with Benjamin Szold and Frederick de Sola Mendes, Marcus Jastrow was characterized by Jewish historian Jacob Rader Marcus as being on the right wing of early American Reform. While opposed to the Pittsburgh Platform, he allowed an organ to be installed in the Rodeph Shalom Congregation.

== Personal life ==
Jastrow was the father of Joseph Jastrow, Morris Jastrow Jr., Alice Jastrow, Annie Jastrow and Nellie Jastrow. Elisabeth Jastrow, the classical archaeologist, was his niece.

== Bibliography ==
- M. Jastrow, "Bär Meisels, Oberrabbiner zu Warschau, Ein Lebensbild auf Historischem Hintergrunde nach Eigner Anschauung Entworfen", in Hebrew Leader, April 1-July 1, 1870
- Jewish Exponent, October 16, 1903
- The History of Rodeph Shalom Congregation, Philadelphia, 1802–1926. Davis, Edward, Philadelphia, 1926
- "A Warning voice: Farewell sermon delivered on the occasion of his retirement". Philadelphia, [s.n.], 1892
- Champion of Orthodox Judaism: A biography of the Reverend Sabato Morais, LL.D.
