= Jacob Frankel =

American Rabbi (1808–1887)

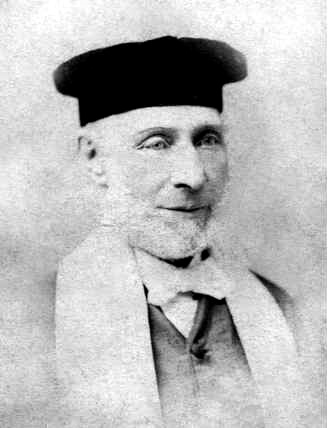
- Native name: Jacob Fränkel
- Born: July 5, 1808; Grünstadt, French Empire
- Died: January 12, 1887 (aged 78) Philadelphia, U.S.
- Allegiance: United States
- Branch: Union Army
- Service years: 1862–1865
- Conflicts: American Civil War

Jacob Frankel (July 5, 1808 – January 12, 1887) was a German-born rabbi who became the first of three official Jewish military chaplains of the United States military during the American Civil War.

== Life and work ==
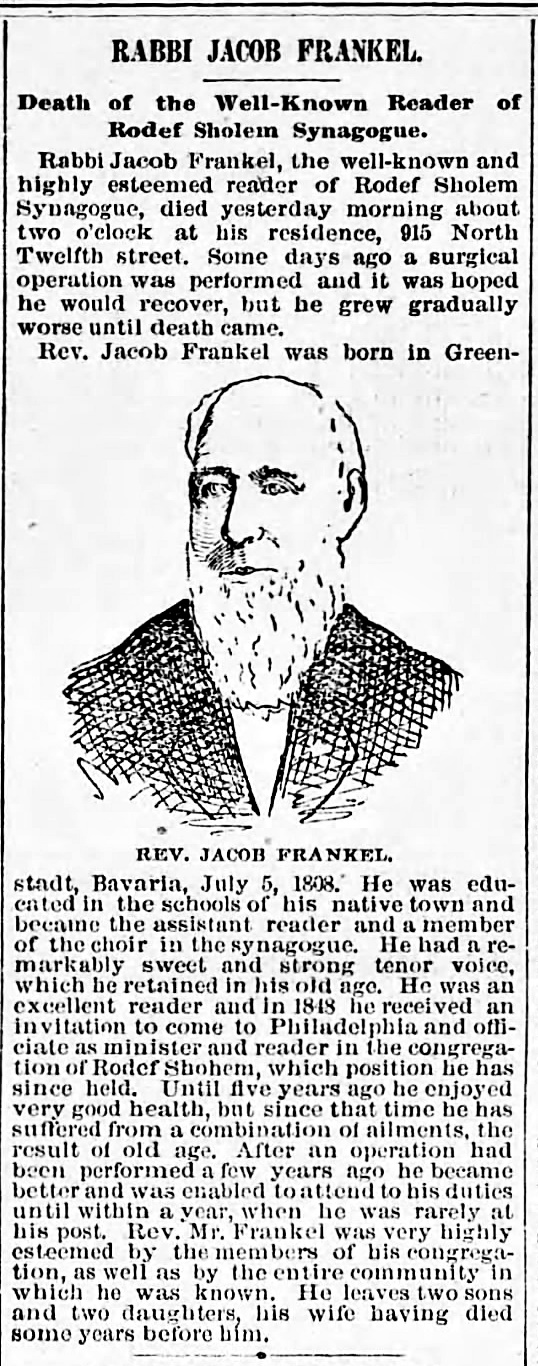
Obituary in the Philadelphia Times, January 13, 1887

Frankel came from a Jewish family with a long tradition of musicians based in Grünstadt in the Palatinate which was then part of the French Empire, and was the son of Joseph and Dorothe Fränkel.

With his two brothers he undertook concert tours, including to neighboring Alsace. Frankel, at the time of Rabbi Leopold Roos, became cantor at his Grünstadt home synagogue, and in 1844 he moved to Mainz. In 1848 he emigrated to the United States.

From 1848 to a year before his death, Frankel served as the cantor and leader of the Rodeph Shalom Congregation in Philadelphia, Pennsylvania. The congregation was a community of Ashkenazi Reform Judaism which had been founded in 1795. He was known as the "sweet singer of Israel."

== Military career ==
Frankel was appointed as one of the first official Jewish chaplains in the Union Army on September 18, 1862, by President Abraham Lincoln. He was also one the first non-Christians to be appointed as a chaplain.

Until Frankel's appointment, the law required a chaplain to be ordained by a "regular ordained minister of some Christian denomination". Michael Mitchell Allen (1830 – 1907), a Philadelphia-born Jew, was the first known Jewish-American to serve as a non-denominational chaplain. Allen served as the original chaplain of the 5th Pennsylvania Cavalry Regiment nicknamed "Cameron's Dragoons" after Secretary of War Simon Cameron. Allen was not a Rabbi, but did study Hebrew and the Code of Jewish Law in Philadelphia. Despite his Jewish roots Allen held non-denominational religious services for soldiers of the 5th Pennsylvania Cavalry. Allen was eventually reported by the YMCA to Adjutant General George D. Ruggles and was forced to resign his commission in order to avoid a dishonorable discharge. This controversy became known as the Jewish Chaplaincy Controversy.

Rabbi Arnold Fischel was later elected to serve as Allen's replacement as a test case, Secretary Cameron denied the request. This denial led to the Board of Delegates of American Israelites and Fischel to lobby to change the law. Fischel also met with President Lincoln who was in favor of changing the law. Once the law was changed, Lincoln appointed three total men as Jewish chaplains, Frankel of Philadelphia, Berhard Gotthelf of Louisville, Kentucky, and Ferdinand Sarner of Rochester, New York.

Frankel served in the military hospitals of Philadelphia which was a center of care for the war wounded. He held this post until mid-1865 and was discharged from the military at that time.

== Death ==
Frankel died in Philadelphia in 1887 as a widower, leaving two sons and two daughters. Isaak Fränkel, one of his brothers, died on December 20, 1877, in Grünstadt at the age of 74 after serving as a cantor for the synagogue there for over 50 years.

== Commemoration ==
During the torpedoing and sinking of the SS Dorchester in 1943, four American military chaplains, including a Jewish chaplain, sacrificed themselves and died in the performance of their duties. In commemoration of this, a medal was designed by the American sculptor Eugene Daub and issued by the Jewish-American Hall of Fame, the Four Chaplains' Medal. The obverse shows Jacob Frankel as the first Jewish chaplain of the United States Army, the reverse shows the fallen clergymen from 1943.

== Literature ==
- Henry S. Morais: The Jews of Philadelphia, Philadelphia, 1894, S. 73 u. 74; (Digitalscan)
- Jonathan D. Sarna, Adam Mendelsohn: Jews and the Civil War, NYU Press, 2011, S. 343–351, ISBN 0814771130; (Digitalscan)
- Lance J. Sussman: Isaac Leeser and the Making of American Judaism, Wayne State University Press, 1996, ISBN 0814326714, S. 224; (Digitalscan)
- Bernhard Kukatzki: Jacob Frankel (1808–1887), ein enger Freund Abraham Lincolns: ein Grünstadter war der erste jüdische Armeegeistliche der USA, in: Pfälzisch-rheinische Familienkunde, Band 16, 2009, S. 638–640; (Findhinweis)
- David B. Green: The U.S. Army gets its first Jewish chaplain, in: Haaretz vom 18. September 2013; (Digitalansicht)
