= Congregation Rodeph Shalom (Philadelphia) =

Historic Reform synagogue in Philadelphia, Pennsylvania, US

- Hebrew: רודף שלום
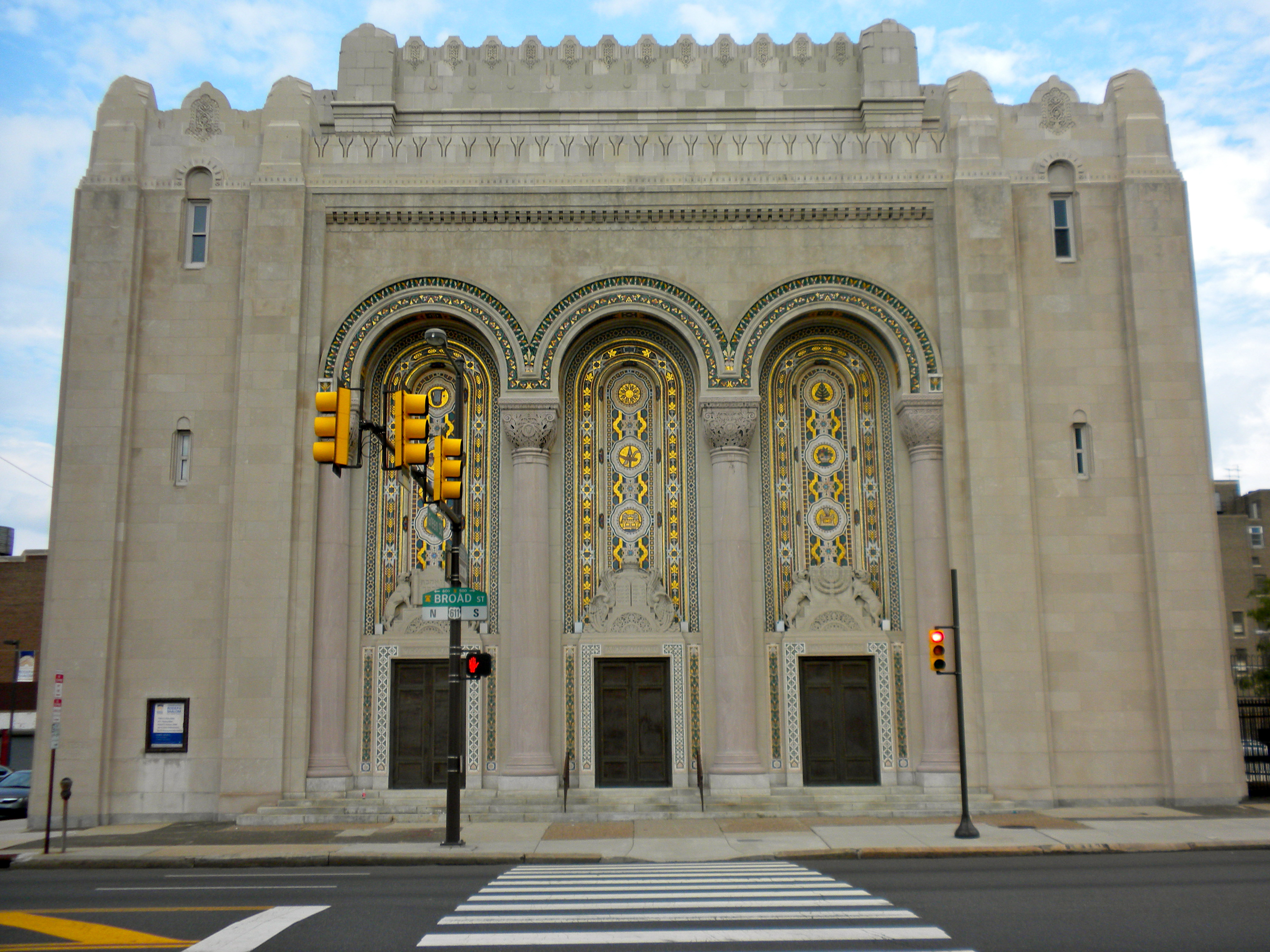
- Rodeph Shalom Synagogue in 2010

- Location in Philadelphia

Religion
- Affiliation: Reform Judaism
- Ecclesiastical or organisational status: Synagogue
- Leadership: Rabbi Jill Maderer; Rabbi Eli C. Freedman
- Status: Active

Location
- Location: 615 N. Broad Street, Philadelphia, Pennsylvania
- Country: United States
- Coordinates: 39°57′55″N 75°9′40″W

Architecture
- Architects: Frank Furness (1866); Simon and Simon (1928)
- Type: Synagogue
- Style: Byzantine Revival; Moorish Revival; Art Deco
- Established: 1795 (as a congregation)
- Completed: 1866 (N. Broad St. #1); 1928 (N. Broad St. #2)

Specifications
- Direction of façade: West
- Materials: Granite, synthetics, limestone

Website
- rodephshalom.org
- Rodeph Shalom Synagogue
- U.S. National Register of Historic Places
- NRHP reference No.: 07000797
- Added to NRHP: August 07, 2007

Congregation Rodeph Shalom (Hebrew: רודף שלום, lit. 'Pursuer of Peace'), is a historic Reform Jewish congregation and synagogue located at 615 North Broad Street, Philadelphia, Pennsylvania, in the United States. Established in 1795, it is the oldest Ashkenazic synagogue in the Western Hemisphere. It is noted historically for its leadership of the Reform movement among American Hebrew congregations, for its spiritual influence upon international Jewry, and for its unique 1927 Byzantine and Moorish Revival synagogue building, with Art Deco finishes, on North Broad Street, listed on the National Register of Historic Places since 2007.

== Origins and early history ==
Founded informally as a minyan of ten worshipers in 1795 by Jews from Germany, Holland, and Poland, Rodeph Shalom adopted its first Articles of Association in 1802, and in 1812 was the first synagogue in Pennsylvania to receive a corporate charter. Its records were kept in Yiddish until 1810 and in German until 1830, and it was known mainly as the congregation of recent immigrants until 1840. The congregation differentiated itself from Congregation Mikveh Israel mainly by offering Philadelphia Jews of northern European origin membership at reduced rates and, in cases of hardship, gratis. Welfare provisions were prominent features of Rodeph Shalom's constitution; rabbis were permitted to extend aid of up to five dollars to any sick or poor person, for example. But there was a price for these amenities: absence from Friday evening or Saturday morning services was punishable by fine, excused only by sickness or travel out of town.

Services were held during the congregation's first seven decades in a variety of locations: initially in a building on Margaretta Street before Second; after 1820 at 1 Bread (Moravian) Street; by 1830 at 7 Pear Alley (Chancellor Street); and until 1840 at 15 Vine Street and at Fifth and Cherry. Relatively late in its history, then, the congregation finally built its first building in 1866, a Moorish Revival sanctuary on North Broad Street designed by Philadelphia architect Frank Furness.

Lay readers conducted services at Rodeph Shalom during its first decades. Mayer Ullmann, co-writer of the congregation's first by-laws in 1810 that made no provision for a paid leader, or hazzan, was the first appointed baal tefilla, or leader of services. He was joined in 1818 by Abraham Levy, who conducted Sabbath and holiday services. The first formally appointed hazzan of Rodeph Shalom was Charleston, South Carolina, native Rabbi Jacob Lippman, who was forced to supplement his annual salary of $30 for part-time service by keeping a second-hand clothing store on South Street.

Of course in this era, the number of Philadelphia Jews was relatively small. In 1822, only 225 foreign-born, mostly Ashkenazic Jews resided in Philadelphia and were outnumbered by those born in America. Recent immigrants did not outnumber native-born Jewish Philadelphians until 1830, but these Jews, far fewer than one thousand in the burgeoning town, assimilated so handily to life in America that they presented few problems to either their adopted city or to their Jewish neighbors.

== Becoming Reform: Marcus Jastrow ==
The Reverend Isaac Leeser, chosen by Congregation Mikveh Israel in 1829 as its hazzan, began to preach in English in 1831, inviting other Hebrew congregations to share his vision of Jewish ecumenism and beginning a period of institutional adaptation to the changing physical, educational, and economic circumstances of modern Jews in America and around the world that would lead directly to the rise of the Reform movement. Leeser founded the first Jewish Sunday school in 1838 and would publish the Occident and American Jewish Advocate, a monthly international Jewish periodical, in 1868.

On April 13, 1843, the day prior to the commencement of Passover, Rodeph Shalom moved into and dedicated its second sanctuary on the third floor of a building on N Fourth St between Vine and Wood Streets in the Northern Liberties neighborhood. The procession into the new sanctuary was led by Isaac Leeser from Mikveh Israel, who was followed by Rodeph Shalom's senior cleric, Reverend Rau, and his assistant Reverend Pape. They carried the congregation's Torah scrolls and made seven circuits around the new space. At the time, Jews numbered approximately 60,000 in the United States, and Rodeph Shalon remained one of only two synagogues in Philadelphia.

A new brand of Jewish spiritual leader, the ordained rabbi with a university doctorate of divinity bearing the title "Reverend Doctor", arrived on the Rodeph Shalom scene in 1853, when the congregation was the first in the city to hire one of the new breed, Rabbi Bernard L. Illoway, as rabbi, preacher, and Sunday school principal. Illoway worked alongside the Rev. Jacob Frankel, who had joined the staff in 1849, but later departed in 1862 following his appointment as the first official Jewish chaplain in the US Army, in part through the efforts of the Board of Delegates of American Israelites.

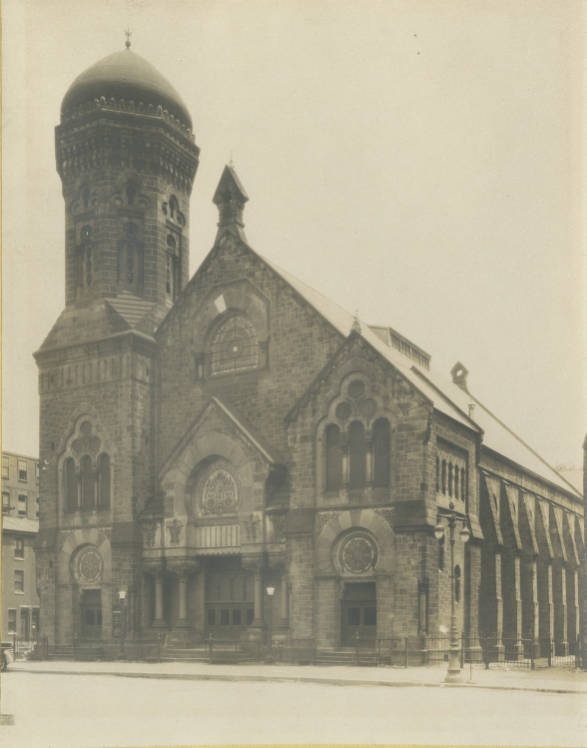
Rodeph Shalom synagogue, designed by Frank Furness, completed in 1866

The 1850s and 1860s were marked by Leeser's call for a synod of Philadelphia congregations and by Congregation Keneseth Israel's Rabbi David Einhorn's denunciations of slavery as contrary to Biblical and Talmudic law. In 1866, Rodeph Shalom called Warsaw's scholarly Rabbi Marcus Jastrow to its pulpit in acknowledgment of his heroic activism against the Russia-dominated Polish government. Leeser and Jastrow then helped form a short-lived rabbinical seminary, Maimonides College, at which Jastrow taught philosophy, history, Biblical exegesis, and Talmud and eventually succeeded Leeser as provost.

Jastrow became active on the national stage as editor-in-chief of the Jewish Publication Society's Holy Scriptures and author of a classic Aramaic-English scriptural dictionary. He was asked to open the United States House of Representatives in Washington, D.C., with prayer in 1869, and hosted the meeting of Philadelphia philanthropists at Rodeph Shalom that resulted in creation of the city's United Hebrew Charities, which later became the Federation of Jewish Agencies.

With Jastrow's thoughtful and scholarly sermons attracting larger audiences and wider membership, Rodeph Shalom erected its first dedicated building in the Moorish style at Broad and Mount Vernon Streets, six blocks north of Penn Square, in 1869. Jastrow moved the congregation closer to Reform by instituting a mixed choir, installing an organ, abolishing the women's gallery, and ending the sale of mitzvot, although he maintained separate male and female seating in the sanctuary.

But the tide of greater spiritual reform was sweeping the country, and by 1892, Jastrow was looked upon as a conservative and dismissed. The Pittsburgh Conference of 1885, presided over by Rabbi Isaac Mayer Wise, had settled upon a group of eight principles that defined Reform Judaism until 1937. This platform rejected the atavistic elements of Mosaic law, including dietary restrictions and special garments; it accepted modern science, preached the need to teach morality, defined Judaism as a religion rather than a nationality, welcomed all faiths in a rational, ecumenical fraternity, and affirmed the need for social justice and social action.

== The titans of Reform: Berkowitz and Wolsey ==
Jastrow was replaced in December 1892 by the Rev. Dr. Henry Berkowitz (1857–1924), formerly spiritual leader of congregations in Mobile, Alabama, and Kansas City, Missouri, and Philadelphia's first American-born rabbi. Following the lead of his close friend, Keneseth Israel's Joseph Krauskopf, Berkowitz created a library at Rodeph Shalom and began publishing his sermons in English, making the study of German at the religious school optional and soon abandoned. Congregational singing and a children's choir became regular features at worship services. In 1893, Berkowitz was instrumental in creating the Jewish Chautauqua Society for the promotion and dissemination of studies in Jewish history and education of non-Jews about Judaism. In 1894, Berkowitz replaced Jastrow's prayerbook with the newly published Union Prayer Book, and by 1897, he had re-made the congregation in his warm and empathetic personal image.

Berkowitz's activities were not circumscribed by his religious ties. He was an executive member and honorary vice president of the Playgrounds Association that brought recreation and social services to children in Philadelphia's underprivileged neighborhoods. He served on a Vice Commission that worked to end prostitution among immigrant girls. He vigorously opposed those who insisted that contemporary Judaism demanded creation of a national Jewish state in Palestine with his widely publicized statement, "Why I am Not a Zionist". During World War I, he lectured widely to raise funds for relief for war victims and toured army camps, lecturing to service men.

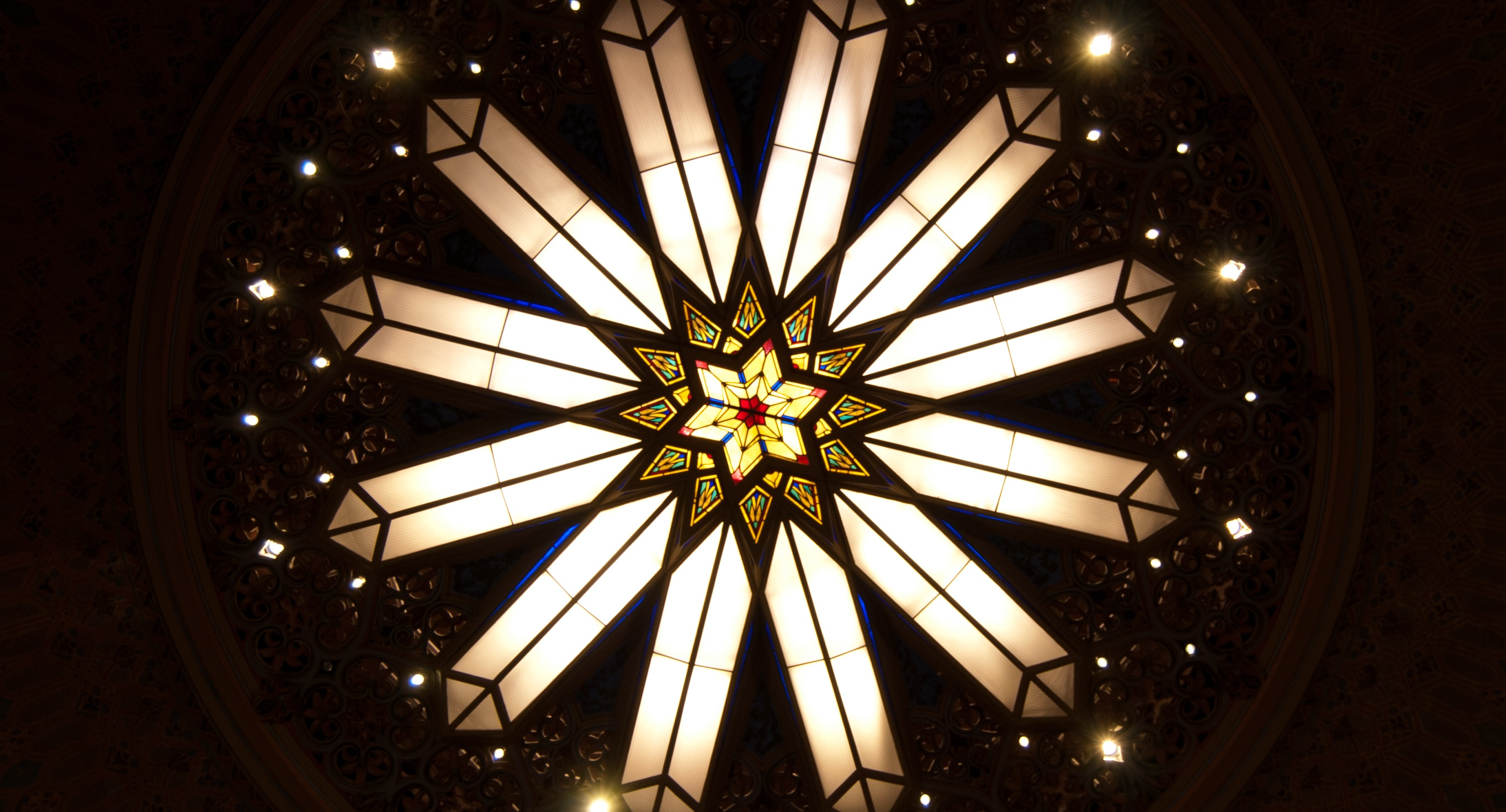
Rodeph Shalom Synagogue's sanctuary ceiling

Berkowitz's failing health and eventual death in 1924 brought interim rabbi Harry W. Ettelson and associate rabbi Ferdinand Isserman to the pulpit at Rodeph Shalom that year. In 1925, Louis Wolsey arrived from Cleveland's Euclid Avenue (Fairmount) Temple with a national reputation for pulpit oratory, and a new chapter of the congregation's history began. Wolsey moved quickly to move the religious school, long conducted off campus at a remote facility at Broad and Jefferson, to the congregation's main edifice at Broad and Mount Vernon. Immediately elected president of the Central Conference of American Rabbis and then chairman of the Conference's Committee on Synagogue Music, Wolsey published the third edition of the Union Hymnal that notably and for the first time included hymns from every competent Jewish composer of the era.

In 1928, needing a larger sanctuary and additional meeting and office areas, the congregation, under Wolsey's leadership, built its present magnificent Moorish Revival synagogue. The interior, including its star-burst skylights, stained glass windows, bronze-and-enamel doors of the Aron Kodesh, walls, ceiling, dome, carpet and ornamentation are by D'Ascenzo Studio.

Like Berkowitz, Wolsey was a leader of the Anti-Zionism movement in Reform Judaism that in 1937 repudiated an attempt by the Central Conference to institute a theme of Jewish peoplehood and allow for Zionist sentiment within the Reform movement. Also like Berkowitz, Wolsey's social activism transcended religious and geographical boundaries; he established the Mount Vernon Center for underprivileged children in the neighborhood surrounding the congregation's Mount Vernon Street edifice and created the Well Baby Clinic to teach young mothers homemaking and preventive medical care. In 1937, he became chairman of Philadelphia's Vice and Crime Commission and made recommendations that helped change Pennsylvania's outmoded criminal parole system.

== The age of David H. Wice ==
"Rabbi David H. Wice, who served Rodeph Shalom from 1947 until 1981, shepherded the congregation through a period of unprecedented growth and social change. He enlarged the scope of synagogue services and connected Judaism to the everyday lives of his congregants. As Philadelphia's Jews migrated to the city's northern suburbs, Rabbi Wice created the congregation's Suburban Center in Elkins Park, a spiritual sanctuary dedicated to suburban residents that maintained its own religious school and to which Rabbi Wice and his associate and assistant rabbis traveled for sermons and meetings throughout their tenure with the congregation. Throughout his life, Rabbi Wice was a champion of Reform Judaism, the international Progressive Jewish Movement, and was a leading advocate for educational and social welfare causes. As president of the World Union for Progressive Judaism (1973–80), he guided the international Reform movement through a critical period of change and growth. It was during his tenure that the movement moved its headquarters to Jerusalem, which was a central event in the movement's history, reinforcing the centrality of the State of Israel in Progressive Jewish life."

"Rabbi Richard S. Steinbrink, who joined Rodeph Shalom in 1970 under Dr. Wice, served the congregation as senior rabbi from 1981 to 1988. Rabbi Steinbrink reintroduced traditional rituals formerly exclusively associated with Conservatism into Rodeph Shalom's worship service. Presiding over his first service as senior rabbi, for example, Rabbi Steinbrink wore a black robe and tallis on the bimah, an act controversial at the time. But more importantly, Steinbrink focused his spiritual attention on issues of broad and ecumenical public concern, such as nuclear arms control, local and world hunger, and the crisis in public education, urging the congregation to think critically about the secular world with the tools of Jewish morality and to fight for change within that world when necessary."

"Rabbi Alan D. Fuchs led the congregation as senior rabbi from 1988 to 1998. A graduate of Trinity College in Hartford, Connecticut, he was ordained by the Hebrew Union College-Jewish Institute of Religion in 1963. Before joining Rodeph Shalom, Rabbi Fuchs served as senior rabbi of the Isaac M. Wise Temple in Cincinnati, Ohio. He was also rabbi at Temple Sinai in Pittsburgh; Congregation Keneseth Israel in Elkins Park; and Temple Beth El in Somerville, New Jersey; and served as a US Army chaplain at Fort Knox, Kentucky, and Verdun, France."

== Rodeph Shalom today ==
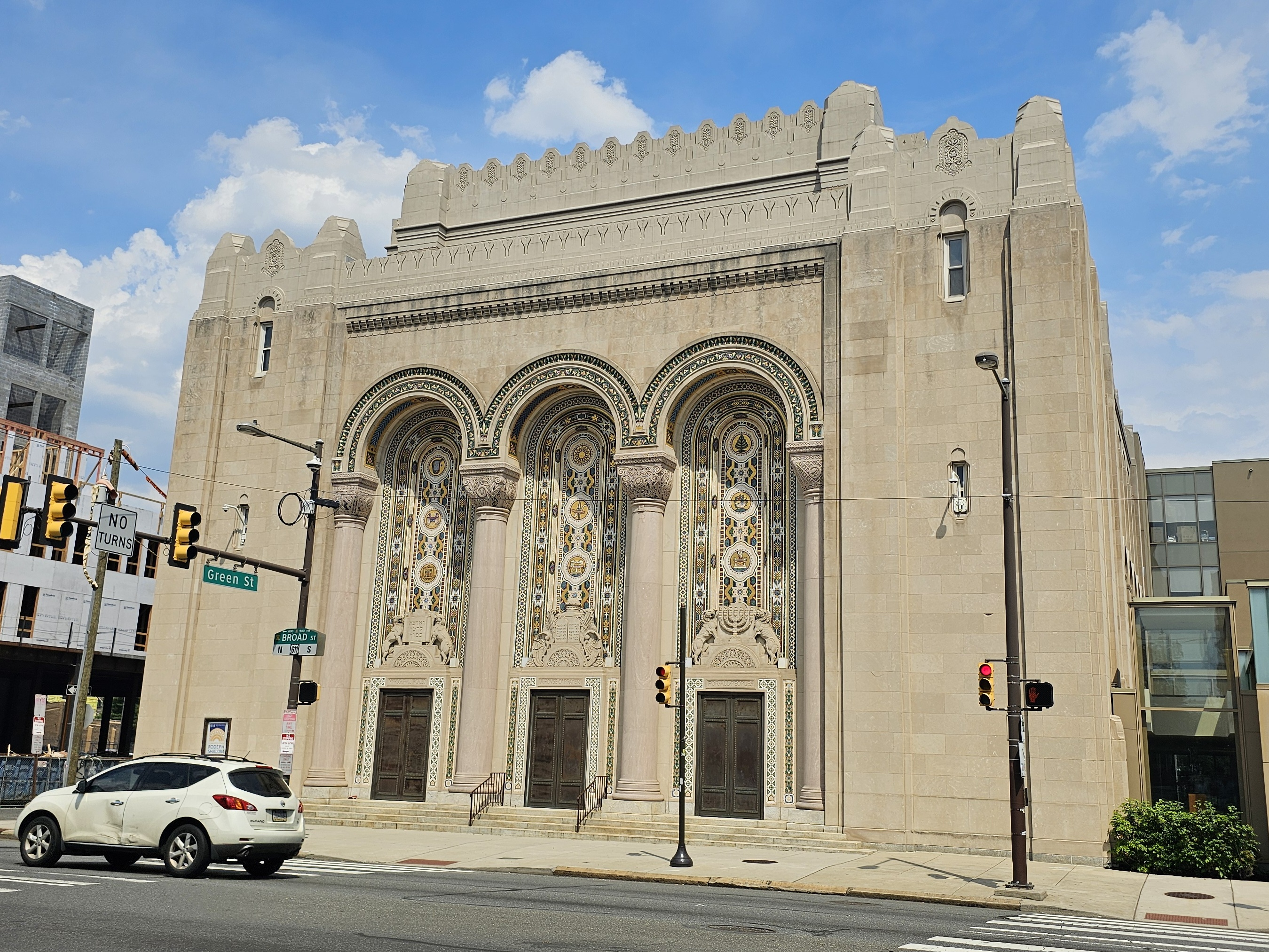
The synagogue in 2024

"William I. Kuhn became senior rabbi of Congregation Rodeph Shalom in 1998. Rabbi Kuhn was ordained in 1994 by the Hebrew Union College-Jewish Institute of Religion, and immediately came to RS, serving as assistant and associate rabbi beginning in 1994. He brings broad and distinctive life experience to the congregation's historic pulpit." Throughout his tenure, Rabbi Kuhn has initiated and overseen Rodeph Shalom's ambitious and wide-ranging efforts to encourage all members of the congregation to volunteer a significant amount of their time in the betterment of their community.

"A native and longtime resident of Nashville, Tennessee, Rabbi Kuhn's great love for Judaism was nurtured at Congregation Ohabai Sholom and within his family, which had founded the synagogue in the 1860s and remains vitally active in it to this day. He continued the Kuhn family tradition of leadership as a board member and officer of Ohabai Sholom, particularly while chairing the Social Action Committee, when he was instrumental in establishing a homeless shelter at the Temple."

After graduating from the Wharton School of the University of Pennsylvania, "Rabbi Kuhn served as vice-president of Kuhn's Big K Stores Corporation, a family-owned retail business, and later established and was president of General Property Investor's Corporation, a real-estate investment firm." Throughout this period, he was active in Nashville community affairs.

"In Philadelphia, Rabbi Kuhn is an active member of the boards of Jewish Federation of Greater Philadelphia, Jewish Family and Children's Services, and the National Conference for Community and Justice. He served on Mayor John Street's Transition Committee as co-chairman of the Volunteer and Faith-Based Organizations Sub-committee and on the Human Relations Commission for the City of Philadelphia."

In 2003–04, under Rabbi Kuhn's direction, Rodeph Shalom carried out a major restoration of its main sanctuary. The entire building was rewired for modern electricity requirements and the air conditioning and heating systems replaced with modern equipment. Lighting fixtures were removed, cleaned and restored; ceiling painted and reguilded; wallpaper cleaned; and carpeting and seats replaced.

During his successful campaign for the presidency, Barack Obama spoke in the synagogue at Passover, 2008.

In 2017, Rabbi Jill L. Maderer became the Senior Rabbi of Rodeph Shalom.

Rodeph Shalom held events in support of Israel during the Gaza war, including a 30 November 2023 fundraiser for the Friends of the IDF and a 10 December rally attended by Josh Shapiro and Bob Casey.

== See also ==
- History of the Jews in Pennsylvania

== Bibliography ==
- Wolf, Edwin II; Whiteman, Maxwell (1975). The History of the Jews of Philadelphia from Colonial Times Until the Age of Jackson. Philadelphia, PA: Jewish Publication Society of America.
- Stern, Malcolm H. (1983). "National Leaders of Their Time: Philadelphia's Reform Rabbis". In Murray Friedman (ed.). Jewish Life in Philadelphia, 1830–1940. Philadelphia, PA: Institute for the Study of Human Issues.
- Stolzman, Henry; Stolzman, Daniel; Hausman, Tami (2004). Synagogue Architecture in America: Faith, Spirit & Identity. Images Publishing Group.
