= William B. Hackenburg =

American silk manufacturer (1837–1918)

William Bower Heckenburg
- Born: June 2, 1837; Philadelphia, Pennsylvania, U.S.
- Died: June 27, 1918 (aged 81); Philadelphia, Pennsylvania, U.S.
- Resting place: Mt. Sinai Cemetery
- Occupations: Silk manufacturer Philanthropist
- Years active: 1858–1918
- Spouse: Adeline Schoneman
- Children: None
- Parent(s): Judah Lazarus Hackenburg; Maria Allen

William Bower Heckenburg (June 2, 1837 – June 27, 1918) was a Jewish-American silk manufacturer and philanthropist from Philadelphia.

== Life ==
Hackenburg was born on June 2, 1837, in Philadelphia, Pennsylvania, the son of Judah Lazarus Hackenburg and Maria Allen. His father was a German immigrant from Koblenz, Prussia, and his mother was an English immigrant.

Hackenburg attended public school in Philadelphia and received religious and Hebrew instruction from A.I.H. Bernal and Sim'ha Cohen Peixotto. He went to New York City, New York, in 1850 and attended a boarding school headed by Rabbi Max Lilienthal. Two years later, he began working at the general merchandise store of S. & D. Teller in Wilmington, North Carolina. He worked there for several years, after which he returned to Philadelphia and began working in his father's business as a jobber in shawls and dress goods. The business closed with his father's death in 1861. In 1863, he, Jacob Aub, and Anthony Bohem formed the firm Aub, Hackenburg & Company, which manufactured and dealt in machine and sewing silks. The business grew so quickly they established branch offices in several American cities. Following Aub's death in 1887 the firm was renamed W.B. Hackenburg & Company, and in 1889 Bohem died as well.

Hackenburg's communal work began in 1858, when he became secretary of the United Hebrew Relief Society. He was a founder of the Hebrew Charity Ball Association in 1859, after which he served as its manager. He was an organizer of the Jewish Hospital and Home for Aged and Infirm Israelites in 1865, and also served as a director of the Hospital for four years, treasurer for nine years, and president for 27 years. He was a charter member of the United Hebrew Charities in 1869 and of the Federation of Jewish Charities in 1901. He was a founder and director of the Young Men's Hebrew Association in 1874. He was also actively identified with the reorganization of the Jewish Foster Home and Orphan Asylum and was a director of the Hebrew Education Society. In 1882, he was an organizer and secretary of a mass meeting of Philadelphia citizens to protest a wave of pogroms in the Russian Empire and served as a committee member to aid Russian refugees. He was also a founder of the Jewish Publication Society, a trustee of the Baron de Hirsch Fund and Dropsie College, and vice-president of the Board of Delegates of American Israelites. In 1878, he assisted the Board in compiling a statistical survey of American Jews.

Never a candidate for public office, Hackenburg was appointed a member of the Board of Prison Inspectors of Philadelphia in 1896. He was reappointed annually to that office until he resigned a few years before his death. He joined the Freemasons in 1861, represented his lodge in the Grand Lodge of the State of Pennsylvania for 48 years, served on the Grand Lodge's Committee of Appeals for 38 years, and became the R. W. Grand Treasurer of the Grand Lodge in 1907, serving in the latter office until his death. In 1864, he married Adeline Schoneman. They had no children.

Hackenburg died from a stroke of paralysis at the Jewish Hospital on June 27, 1918. Nearly two thousand people attended his funeral at the Jewish Hospital, including officers of the Grand Lodge of Masons of Pennsylvania and hundreds of prominent business and professional men. Rabbi Henry Berkowitz conducted the funeral service and delivered a prayer. The honorary pallbearers were the officers and directors of the Jewish Hospital. He was buried in Mt. Sinai Cemetery, where Rabbi Marvin Nathan read the services.
