= Arnold Fischel =

19th-century Dutch rabbi

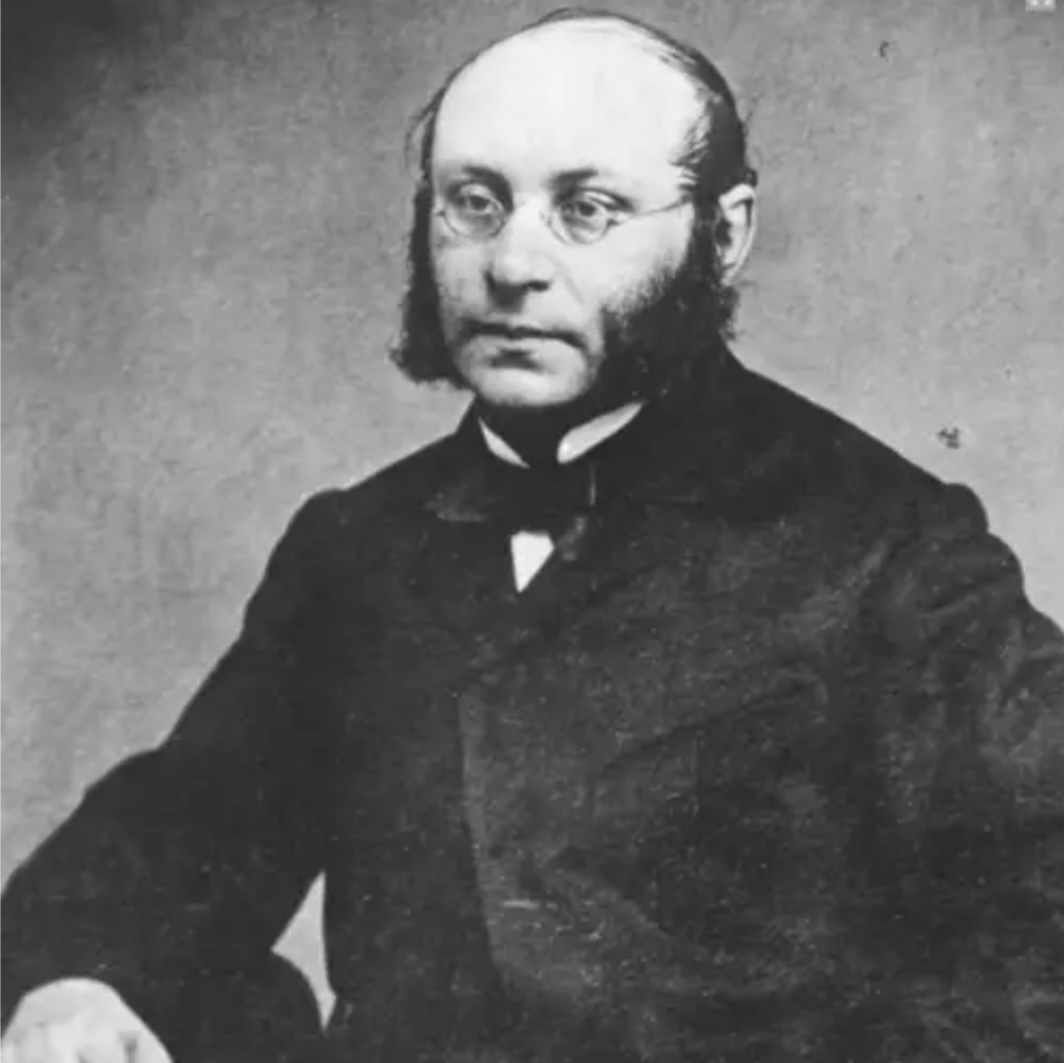

Arnold Fischel (1830–1894) was a politically influential 19th-century Dutch rabbi. He was instrumental in getting the United States military chaplaincy law changed to allow for inclusion of Jewish chaplains in 1862.

== Early life ==
Fischel was a native of the Netherlands from an Ashkenazi Jewish family. He is found in England in 1849 and for a few years thereafter before removing to the United States.

== First public address ==
In March 1849, Fischel reportedly gave a philological discourse on "the Peculiarness and Beauties of the Hebrew Language" before the Brighton Royal Literary and Scientific Society. Several months later, he is found to be giving another address titled “Sublimity of Hebrew Poetry compared with that of the Greek and Roman classics.”

== Congregational lecturer positions ==
In 1852, Fischel was elected to the position of lecturer at the Liverpool Old Hebrew Congregation. Less than a month later, he accrued the title of reverend and was named to board of management of the Liverpool Hebrew Education Institute. In September 1856, he was called to serve as a lecturer at Congregation Shearith Israel in New York City, which post he would occupy by annual reelection until October 1861.

== Chaplaincy nomination rejected ==
In September 1861, the Pennsylvania 5th Cavalry's 65th Regiment (aka Cameron's Dragoons) installed as their regimental chaplain a Sephardic Jewish Hebrew teacher, Michael M. Allen. At this time, US chaplains operated under the authority and at the pleasure of the US Christian Commission, a branch of YMCA. When the Commission learned that a Jewish man was serving the regiment as chaplain, it demanded his removal, as US law required that a chaplain be an ordained minister of "a Christian denomination."

Allen resigned by month's end, and the regimental field commanders elected another Jewish man, this time Rabbi Arnold Fischel, as his replacement. Fischel's nomination was rejected on the same grounds as Allen's. Secretary of War Simon Cameron sent Fischel the following notice:

"Rev. A. Fischel, Rabbi, Jewish Synagogue, New York.

Sir: -- Your communication of the 17th has been received. In reply, you are respectfully informed that by the 9th Section of the Act of Congress, approved July 22nd, 1861, it is provided that the chaplain appointed "by the vote of the field officers and company commanders must be a regular ordained minister of some Christian denomination." A like provision also is made in the 7th Section of the Act of Congress, approved August 3, 1861. Were it not for the impediments thus directly created by the provisions of these two Acts, the Department would have taken your application into its favorable consideration.

I have the honor to be, very respectfully,

Simon Cameron, Secretary of War"

The Board of Delegates of American Israelites invited Fischel to lobby under their banner for a change to the language in the Acts which had resulted in his rejection, and he immediately accepted. He was granted an audience with President Lincoln to discuss the matter, and Lincoln's response was favorable to the rabbi's position. Fischel wrote of the meeting that Lincoln "fully admitted the justice of my remarks... and agreed that something ought to be done to meet this case."

He was ultimately successful in having Congress change the word "Christian" to "religious," and two Jewish chaplains were subsequently installed in the Union Army: Rabbi Jacob Frankel as a military hospital chaplain in Philadelphia in September 1862 and Rev. Ferdinand Leopold Sarner as the regimental chaplain for the 54th New York Volunteer Infantry on 10 April 1863.

== Wartime interviews ==
Fischel interviewed a large number of Jewish soldiers of the Union Army and found that many more were serving than were known to be. He wrote in a letter to Henry I. Hart, then president of the Board of Delegates of American Israelites: "As a general rule, they are not known as Jews but hundreds with whom I have conversed express their anxiety and hope that some provision may be made for them, so that in case of sickness or death, they be not left to the mercy of strangers."

== Civilian chaplaincy ==
Following his successful completion of the lobbying task, the board of delegates appointed Fischel to serve as a civilian chaplain in the Potomac region in exchange for a $20/week expense stipend.

== Return to the Netherlands ==
Fischel returned to England in late 1862 due to the Board of Delegates being unable to continue contributing to his expenses, which were running at twice his stipend. He remained in the Netherlands until his death in 1894.
