= 5th Pennsylvania Cavalry Regiment =

Union Army cavalry regiment

5th Pennsylvania Cavalry
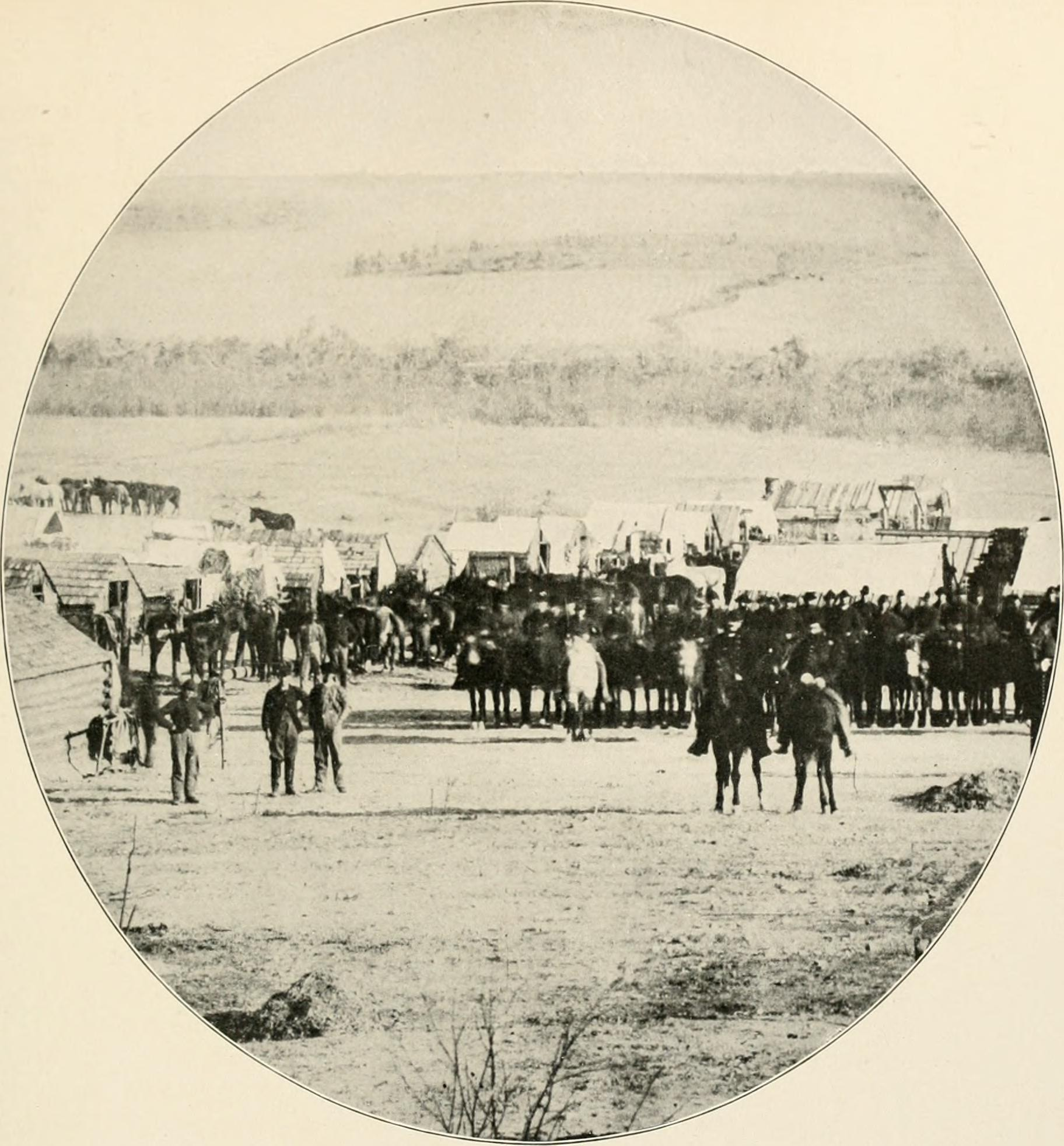
- Cameron Dragoons at Darbytown Road, October 29, 1864
- Active: July 1861 to August 16, 1865
- Country: United States
- Allegiance: Union
- Branch: Cavalry
- Engagements: Seven Days Battles (Companies I & K); Siege of Petersburg; First Battle of Petersburg; First Battle of Deep Bottom (detachment); Appomattox Campaign; Battle of Five Forks; Battle of Sailor's Creek; Battle of Appomattox Court House

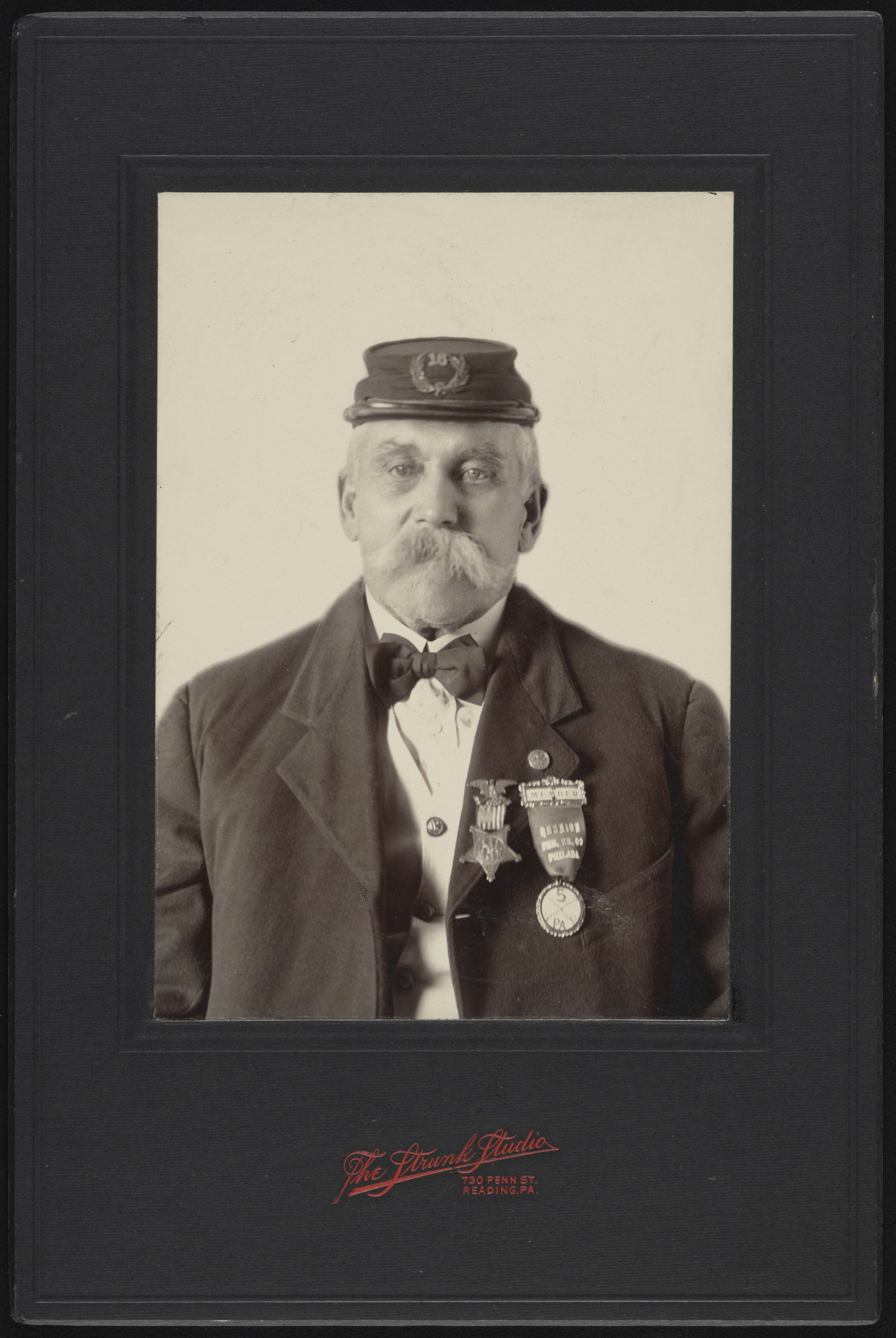
Union veteran Peter D. Helms, bugler of Co. D, 5th Pennsylvania Cavalry Regiment. From the Liljenquist Family Collection of Civil War Photographs, Prints and Photographs Division, Library of Congress

The 5th Pennsylvania Cavalry (65th Volunteers / "Cameron Dragoons") was a cavalry regiment that served in the Union Army during the American Civil War.

== Service ==
The 5th Pennsylvania Cavalry was organized at Philadelphia, Pennsylvania beginning in July 1861 as the "65th Volunteers" and mustered in for three years service under the command of Colonel Max Friedman.

The regiment was attached to Smith's Division, Army of the Potomac, to March 1862. Unattached, IV Corps, Army of the Potomac, to December 1862. West's Advance Brigade, IV Corps, Department of Virginia, to June 1863. 2nd Brigade, 1st Division, IV Corps, Department of Virginia, to July 1863. Wistar's Brigade, Yorktown, Virginia, Department of Virginia and North Carolina, to August 1863. U.S. Forces, Portsmouth, Virginia, Department of Virginia and North Carolina, to December 1863. District Currituck, Department of Virginia and North Carolina, to January 1864. Heckman's Division, XVIII Corps, Department of Virginia and North Carolina, to April 1864. 2nd Brigade, Cavalry Division, Department of Virginia and North Carolina, Army of the James, to May 1864. 1st Brigade, Kautz's Cavalry Division, Department of Virginia and North Carolina, to April 1865. Cavalry Brigade, Department of Virginia, to July 1865. Richmond, Virginia, District Henrico, Department of Virginia, to August 1865.

The 5th Pennsylvania Cavalry mustered out August 7, 1865 and was discharged August 16, 1865 at Philadelphia.

== Detailed service ==
Moved to Washington, D.C., August 22, 1861. Duty in the Department of Washington, D.C., until May 8, 1862. Reconnaissance to Pohick Church, Va., December 18, 1861 (Companies C, F, and H). Flint Hill and Hunter's Mill February 7, 1862. Fairfax Court House February 6. Expedition to Vienna and Flint Hill February 22. Duty near Alexandria until May. Ordered to Yorktown, Va., May 8. Scouting about Gloucester Point May 10 (Companies A, B, E, and L). Scouting about Williamsburg May 12. Skirmishes at Mechanicsville May 23–24. Seven days before Richmond June 25-July 1 (Companies I and K). Savage Station June 29. White Oak Swamp Bridge June 30. Malvern Hill July 1. Reconnaissance from Yorktown to Gloucester, Matthews, and King and Queen Counties July 7–9 (Companies B, E, L, and M). Duty at Yorktown and Williamsburg until September 8, 1863. Williamsburg and Fort Magruder September 9, 1862. Reconnaissance from Yorktown to Gloucester, Matthews, King and Queen, and Middlesex Counties December 11–15. Reconnaissance to Burnt Ordinary December 17. Expedition to West Point and White House January 7–9, 1863 (detachment). Burnt Ordinary January 19. Near Olive Creek Church February 5 (Companies L and M). Williamsburg and Olive Branch Church February 7. Williamsburg March 23 and 29. Whittaker's Mills April 11. Reconnaissance through Gates County and down Chowan River June 5–13. Nine Mile Ordinary June 14. Diascund Bridge June 20. Dix's Peninsula Campaign June 24-July 8. Barnesville June 28. Baltimore Cross Roads June 29. Expedition from White House to Bottom's Bridge July 1–7. Baltimore Cross Roads July 1. Bottom's Bridge July 2. Expedition to Bottom's Bridge August 26–29. New Kent Court House August 28. Bottom's Bridge August 29. Ordered to Norfolk, Va., September 8, and duty about Norfolk and Portsmouth, Va., until December. Companies C, D, F, H, and I at South Mills, N.C., September 13. Companies A, B, E, G, K, L, and M at Great Bridge. Expedition to Indiantown, N.C., September 15–20 (Company D). Near Kempsville September 15. Indiantown September 20. (Companies F and H at Drummond Lake September 15.) Companies C, F, H, and I advanced to Raleigh September 22; Companies A, B, L, and M to Currituck Court House September 23. Affair on Back Bay September 30 (detachment). Scout from Great Bridge to Indiantown, N.C., October 13 (detachment). Bingo Landing October 16–17 (detachment). Camden Court House October 17. Regiment assembled at Great Bridge October 20. Expedition from Norfolk to South Mills, Camden, etc., N.C., December 5–24. Duty at Yorktown and in District of the Currituck until May 1864. Wistar's Expedition toward Richmond February 6–8. Bottom's Bridge February 4. Ballahock on Bear Quarter Road and Deep Creek February 29-March 1. Ballahock Station near Dismal Swamp Canal March 1. Deep Creek March 2. Reconnaissance from Portsmouth to the Blackwater April 13–15 (detachment). Kautz's Raid on Petersburg & Weldon Railroad May 5–11. Birch Island Bridges May 5. Stony Creek Station and Jarrett's Station May 7. White's Bridge, Nottaway Creek, May 8. Nottaway Railroad Bridge May 8. Jarrett's Station May 8–9. Kautz's Raid on Richmond & Danville Railroad May 12–17. Coalfield Station May 13. Powhatan Station May 14. Belcher's Mills May 16. Petersburg June 9. Before Petersburg June 15–18. Siege operations against Petersburg and Richmond June 1864 to April 1865. Roanoke Station June 20, 1864. Wilson's Raid on South Side & Danville Railroad June 22-July 2. Staunton River Bridge or Roanoke Station June 25. Sappony Church, Stony Creek, June 28–29. Ream's Station June 29. Demonstration north of the James at Deep Bottom July 27–29. Malvern Hill July 30. Chaffin's Farm, New Market Heights, September 29–30. Darbytown Road October 7–13 and December 10. Charles City Cross Roads October 26. Battle of Fair Oaks October 27–28. Appomattox Campaign March 28-April 9, 1865. Dinwiddie Court House March 31. Five Forks April 1. Gravelly Ford on Hatcher's Run April 2. Near Amelia Court House April 4–5. Burkesville and Sailor's Creek April 6. Prince Edward's Court House April 7. Appomattox Court House April 9. Surrender of Lee and his army. Duty at Richmond, Va., and in District of Henrico, Department of Virginia, to August.

== Casualties ==
The regiment lost a total of 293 men during service; 1 officer and 76 enlisted men killed or mortally wounded, 6 officers and 210 enlisted men died of disease.

== Commanders ==
- Colonel Max Friedman - resigned March 9, 1862
- Colonel David Campbell - resigned October 16, 1862
- Colonel Robert M. West

== See also ==
- List of Pennsylvania Civil War regiments
- Pennsylvania in the American Civil War
