= Board of Delegates of American Israelites =

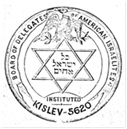

The Board of Delegates of American Israelites was the first Jewish civil and political rights organization in the United States, modeled after the Board of Deputies of British Jews. The organization was established in 1859 with headquarters in New York City and was active as an independent entity for 19 years before merging with the Union of American Hebrew Congregations (which has since been renamed Union for Reform Judaism) in 1878. This merger came at the urging of Simon Wolf, leader of B'nei Brith of Washington, D.C. The Board of Delegates continued to exist and operate as a leg of the UAHC called the Board of Delegates of Civil and Religious Rights until its final dissolution in 1925.

== Objectives ==
Quoting from the Constitution of the Board of Delegates of American Israelites

1. obtaining and collecting statistical information regarding the Jews of the United States for reference purposes
2. the appointment of a Committee of Arbitration for the purpose of settling disputes arising between Congregations, individuals, or public bodies belonging to the Delegates in lieu of resorting to the law
3. to promote religious education by encouraging local Congregational schools and to establish a High School for the training of men as ministers and teachers
4. to keep a watchful eye on occurrences at home and abroad, and see that the civil and religious rights of Israelites are not encroached on, and call attention of the proper authorities to the fact, should any such violation occur
5. to establish and continue communication with other like-minded Jewish organizations throughout the world and especially to establish a thorough union among all the Israelites of the United States

== Edgardo Mortara Case ==
What precipitated the formation of the Board of Delegates of American Israelites was, at least in part, the need for a unified Jewish response to the Mortara case. Mortara was an Italian Jewish boy who was secretly baptized by his family's maid and later abducted in 1858 at the age of six by papal authorities who then refused to return a Catholic convert to a non-Catholic family.

== Union chaplaincy restrictions ==
The Board of Delegates of American Israelites entered the American political ring when the US Secretary of War Simon Cameron rejected the appointment of the 5th Pennsylvania Cavalry's 65th Regiment of a Jewish rabbi to serve as their chaplain. The law was worded that a regiment's leaders could elect anyone to that post who was ordained by "a Christian denomination." The Board of Delegates of American Israelites took upon itself the task of lobbying to get the wording changed to allow for Jewish chaplains to serve. Through the lobbying work of Rabbi Dr. Arnold Fischel, it was successful in that aim, and two Jewish chaplains were subsequently installed in the Union Army: Rabbi Jacob Frankel as a military hospital chaplain in Philadelphia in September 1862 and Rabbi Ferdinand Leopold Sarner as the regimental chaplain for the 54th New York Volunteer Infantry on 10 April 1863.

== General Orders No. 11 ==
Another event which garnered the attention of the Board of Delegates of American Israelites was Major General Ulysses S. Grant's General Order No. 11 (1862). Though the issue was originally raised to the US Government by Cesar J. Kaskel, a Kentucky merchant, the Board of Delegates of American Israelites added its voice to the matter, sending the following telegraph to President Lincoln on 8 January 1863.

== Baseless apprehension of Jews ==
In a case involving the commander of Fort Monroe, Virginia, Major General Benjamin Butler reported having captured "one hundred Confederates, sixty Contrabands [fugitive slaves], and five Jews." The Board appealed to President Lincoln for the release of the Jewish captives. Lincoln not only ordered their release but also demanded from Butler "a prompt and amiable apology" to be rendered to the Jewish men.

== The plight of European Jewry ==
The Board was concerned not just with matters pertaining to the American Jewry, but also, as evidenced by its attention to the Martara case, with the plight of Jewish brethren abroad, especially regarding the treatment of Jewish citizens in Switzerland, Romania, and Russia.

== Members of the Board ==
- Henry I. Hart Esq., President (1859-1876)
- Adolph L. Sanger, President
- Rabbi Isaac Leeser, Vice President
- William B. Hackenburg, Vice President (1875-1878)
- Isaac Seligman, Treasurer
- Myer S. Isaacs, Secretary (1859-1876) & President (1876-1878)
- Samuel Isaacs, Delegate
- Rabbi Dr. Arnold Fischel, Delegate

== Criticism ==
President Lincoln was criticized by Democrats for working with the Board. His critics saw his cooperation with the organization as deleterious to the status quo, given that former slaves were also seeking chaplaincy posts in the Union Army.
