= Spanish and Portuguese Jews =

Jews of Spanish or Portuguese origin

Western Sephardic Jews יהדות ספרד ופורטוגל Judeus da nação portuguesa Judíos sefardíes occidentales
Languages
- Judaeo-Spanish, Judaeo-Portuguese, Sephardi Hebrew (liturgical), later English, Dutch, Low German, Judaeo-Papiamento (in Curaçao)

Religion
- Rabbinic Judaism, Crypto-Judaism, Catholic Church

Related ethnic groups
- other Sephardic Jews, other Jews, and Sephardic Bnei Anusim

Spanish and Portuguese Jews, also called Western Sephardim, Iberian Jews, or Peninsular Jews, are a distinctive sub-group of Sephardic Jews who are largely descended from Jews who lived as New Christians in the Iberian Peninsula during the few centuries following the forced expulsion of unconverted Jews from Spain in 1492 and from Portugal in 1497. They should therefore be distinguished both from the descendants of those expelled in 1492 and from the present-day Jewish communities of Spain and Portugal.

The main present-day communities of Spanish and Portuguese Jews exist in the Netherlands, the United Kingdom, the United States and Canada, and several other Jewish communities in the Americas have Spanish and Portuguese Jewish roots though they no longer follow the distinctive customs of the Spanish and Portuguese Jews.

== Historical background ==
Although the 1492 and 1497 expulsions of unconverted Jews from Spain and Portugal were separate events from the Spanish and Portuguese Inquisitions (which were established over a decade earlier in 1478), they were ultimately linked, as the Inquisition eventually also led to the fleeing out of Iberia of many descendants of Jewish converts to Catholicism in subsequent generations.

Despite the fact that the original Edicts of Expulsion did not apply to Jewish-origin New Christian conversos —as these were now legally Christians— the discriminatory practices that the Inquisition nevertheless placed upon them, which were often lethal, put immense pressure on many of the Jewish-origin Christians to also emigrate out of Spain and Portugal in the immediate generations following the expulsion of their unconverted Jewish brethren.

The Alhambra Decree (also known as the Edict of Expulsion) was an edict issued on 31 March 1492, by the joint Catholic Monarchs of Spain (Isabella I of Castile and Ferdinand II of Aragon) ordering the expulsion of all unconverted practicing Jews from the Kingdoms of Castile and Aragon, including from all its territories and possessions, by 31 July of that year. The primary purpose of the expulsion was to eliminate the influence of unconverted Jews on Spain's by then large Jewish-origin New Christian converso population, to ensure that the prior did not encourage the latter to relapse and revert to Judaism.

Over half of Spain's Jewish origin population had converted to Catholicism as a result of the religious anti-Jewish persecution and pogroms which occurred in 1391. As a result of the Alhambra decree and persecution in prior years, it is estimated that of Spain's total Jewish origin population at the time, over 200,000 Jews converted to Catholicism, and initially remained in Spain. Between 40,000 and 80,000 did not convert to Catholicism, and by their steadfast commitment to remain Jewish were thus expelled. Of those who were expelled as unconverted Jews, an indeterminate number nonetheless converted to Catholicism once outside Spain and eventually returned to Spain in the years following the expulsion due to the hardships many experienced in their resettlement. Many of Spain's Jews who left Spain as Jews also initially moved to Portugal, where they were subsequently forcibly converted to the Catholic Church in 1497.

Most of the Jews who left Spain as Jews accepted the hospitality of Sultan Bayezid II and, after the Alhambra Decree, moved to the Ottoman Empire, where they founded communities openly practising the Jewish religion; they and their descendants are known as Eastern Sephardim.

During the centuries following the Spanish and Portuguese decrees, some of the Jewish-origin New Christian conversos started emigrating from Portugal and Spain, settling until the 1700s throughout areas of Western Europe and non-Iberian realms of the colonial Americas (mostly Dutch realms, including Curaçao in the Dutch West Indies, Recife in Dutch areas of colonial Brazil which eventually were regained by the Portuguese, and New Amsterdam which later became New York) forming communities and formally reverting to Judaism. It is the collective of these communities and their descendants who are known as Western Sephardim, and are the subject of this article.

As the early members of the Western Sephardim consisted of persons who themselves (or whose immediate forebears) personally experienced an interim period as New Christians, which resulted in unceasing trials and persecutions of crypto-Judaism by the Portuguese and Spanish Inquisitions, the early community continued to be augmented by further New Christian emigration pouring out of the Iberian Peninsula in a continuous flow between the 1600s to 1700s. Jewish-origin New Christians were officially considered Christians due to their forced or coerced conversions; as such they were subject to the jurisdiction of the Catholic Church's Inquisitorial system, and were subject to harsh heresy and apostasy laws if they continued to practice their ancestral Jewish faith. Those New Christians who eventually fled both the Iberian cultural sphere and jurisdiction of the Inquisition were able to officially return to Judaism and open Jewish practice once they were in their new tolerant environments of refuge.

As former conversos or their descendants, Western Sephardim developed a distinctive ritual based on the remnants of the Judaism of pre-expulsion Spain, which some had practiced in secrecy during their time as New Christians, and influenced by Judaism as practiced by the communities (including Sephardic Jews of the Ottoman Empire and Ashkenazi Jews) which assisted them in their readoption of normative Judaism; as well as by the Spanish-Moroccan and the Italian Jewish rites practiced by rabbis and hazzanim recruited from those communities to instruct them in ritual practice. A part of their distinctiveness as a Jewish group, furthermore, stems from the fact that they saw themselves as forced to "redefine their Jewish identity and mark its boundaries [...] with the intellectual tools they had acquired in their Christian socialization" during their time as New Christian conversos.

== Terminology ==
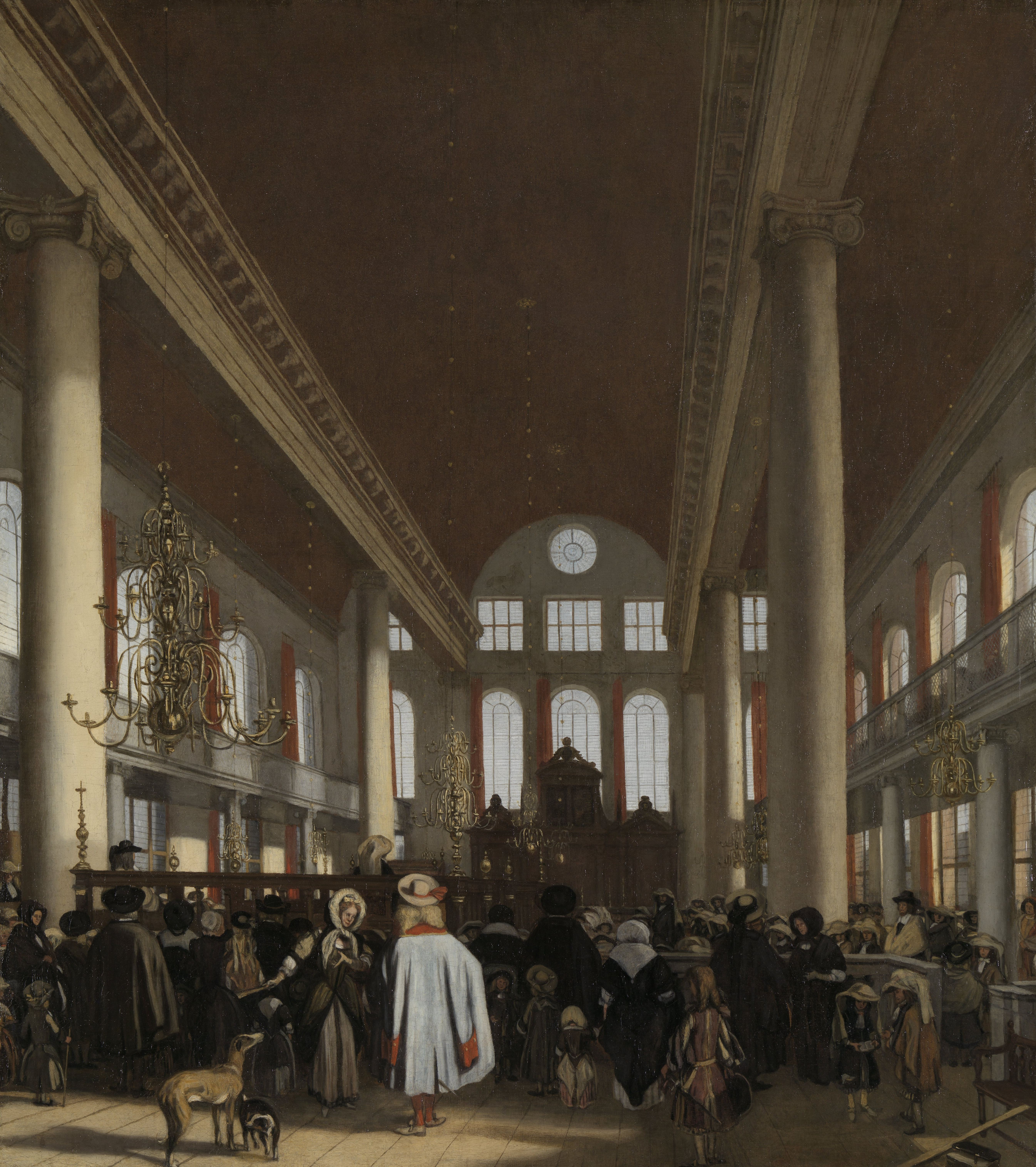
Painting of the Amsterdam Esnoga—considered the mother synagogue by the Spanish and Portuguese Jews—by Emanuel de Witte (ab. 1680).

The main 'Western Sephardic Jewish' communities developed in Western Europe, Italy, and the non-Iberian regions of the Americas.

In addition to the term "Western Sephardim", this sub-group of Sephardic Jews is sometimes also referred to also as "Spanish and Portuguese Jews," "Spanish Jews," "Portuguese Jews," or "Jews of the Portuguese Nation."

The term "Western Sephardim" is frequently used in modern research literature to refer to "Spanish and Portuguese Jews," but sometimes also to "Spanish-Moroccan Jews".

The use of the terms "Portuguese Jews" and "Jews of the Portuguese Nation" in areas such as the Netherlands, Hamburg, Scandinavia, and at one time in London, seems to have arisen primarily as a way for the "Spanish and Portuguese Jews" to distance themselves from Spain in the times of political tension and war between Spain and the Netherlands in the 17th century. Similar considerations may have played a role for ethnic Sephardic Jews in the French regions of Bayonne and Bordeaux, given their proximity to the Spanish border.

Another reason for the terminology of "Portuguese" Jews may have been that a relatively high proportion of the families in question had Portugal as their immediate point of departure from the Iberian peninsula, even when their remoter family background was Spanish rather than Portuguese, since Portugal was the first place of refuge and transit point for many Spanish Jews immediately following their expulsion from Spain.

As the term "Sephardim" (when used in its ethnic sense) necessarily connotes a link with Spain, the distinguishing feature of the Western subgroup was the added link with Portugal. Thus, as a subset of the Sephardim, "Portuguese" and "Spanish and Portuguese" could be used interchangeably. Finally, almost all organised communities in this group traditionally employed Portuguese rather than Spanish as their official or working language.

In Italy, the term "Spanish Jews" (Ebrei Spagnoli) is frequently used, but it includes descendants of Jews expelled as Jews from the Kingdom of Naples, as well as "Spanish and Portuguese Jews" proper (i.e. Jews descended from former conversos and their descendants).

In Venice, Spanish and Portuguese Jews were often described as "Ponentine" (Western), to distinguish them from "Levantine" (Eastern) Sephardim from Eastern Mediterranean areas. Occasionally Italian Jews distinguish between the "Portuguese Jews" of Pisa and Livorno and the "Spanish Jews" of Venice, Modena and elsewhere.

The scholar Joseph Dan distinguishes "medieval Sephardim" (15th and 16th-century Spanish exiles in the Ottoman Empire who arrived as Jews) from "Renaissance Sephardim" (Spanish and Portuguese former converso communities who arrived as New Christians), in reference to the respective times of each grouping's formative contacts with Spanish language and culture.

=== Relation to other Sephardi communities ===
The term Sephardi means "Spanish" or "Hispanic", and is derived from Sepharad, a Biblical location. The location of the biblical Sepharad is disputed, but Sepharad was identified by later Jews as Hispania, that is, the Iberian Peninsula. Sepharad still means "Spain" in modern Hebrew.

The relationship between Sephardi-descended communities is illustrated in the following diagram:

Pre-Expulsion Sephardi Jewish Population of Iberia
Spanish Alhambra Decree of 1492, Portuguese Decree of 1497
Iberian Exile in the late 15th century	Conversion to Catholicism up to the late 15th century
North African Sephardim	Eastern Sephardim	Sephardic Anusim
Those Jews fleeing from Iberia as Jews in the late 15th century at the issuance of Spain and Portugal's decrees of expulsion. Initially settled in North Africa.	Those Jews fleeing from Iberia as Jews in the late 15th century at the issuance of Spain and Portugal's decrees of expulsion. Initially settled in the Eastern Mediterranean and beyond.	Those Jews in Spain and Portugal who, in an effort to delay or avoid their expulsion (and in most cases in Portugal, in an effort by Manuel I of Portugal to prevent the Jews from choosing the option of exile), are forced or coerced to convert to Catholicism up until the late 15th century, at the expiration of the deadline for their expulsion, conversion, or execution as set out in the decrees. Became conversos/New Christians/marranos in Iberia. As Christians, were under the jurisdiction of the Catholic Church and subject to the Spanish Inquisition.
Migration of Conversos from the 16th to 18th centuries	Clandestine migration of conversos to Ibero-America and their settlement during colonization from the 16th to 18th centuries
Reversion to Judaism from the 16th to 18th centuries	Extension of the Inquisition to Ibero-America in the 16th century
Western Sephardim	Sephardic Bnei Anusim
The first few generations of descendants of Sephardic Anusim who migrated as conversos out of Iberia (to regions beyond the Iberian cultural sphere) between the 16th to 18th centuries where they then reverted to Judaism. Initially settled in the Netherlands, London, Italy, etc.	The later generation descendants of Sephardic Anusim who remained, as conversos, in the Iberian Peninsula or moved to the Iberian colonial possessions across various Latin American countries during the Spanish colonization of the Americas. Subject to the Inquisition until its abolition in the 19th century
Abolition of the Inquisition in the 19th century
Reversion to Judaism in the 20th to 21st centuries
Neo-Western Sephardim
The nascent and growing population of returnees to Judaism among the Sephardic Bnei Anusim population whose recent return began in the late 20th and early 21st centuries in Iberia and Ibero-America.

"Sephardim" properly refers to all Jews whose families have extended histories in Spain and Portugal, in contrast to Ashkenazi Jews and all other Jewish ethnic divisions. However, Mizrahi Jews, who have extended histories in the Greater Middle East and North Africa, are often called "Sephardim" more broadly in colloquial and religious parlance due to similar styles of liturgy and a certain amount of intermarriage between them and Sephardim proper.

The main factor distinguishing "Spanish and Portuguese Jews" (Western Sephardim) from other "Sephardim proper" is that "Spanish and Portuguese Jews" refers specifically to those Jews who descend from persons whose history as practising members of Jewish communities with origins in the Iberian peninsula was interrupted by a period of having been New Christians (also known as conversos, the Spanish term for "converts" to Catholicism; or cristãos-novos, "new Christians" in the Portuguese equivalent) or anusim (Hebrew for those "forced" to convert from Judaism to another faith).

During their period as New Christians, many conversos continued to practise their Jewish faith in secrecy as best they could. Those New Christian conversos of Jewish origin who maintained crypto-Jewish practices in secret were termed marranos (Spanish "swine") by Old Christian Spaniards and Portuguese.

Conversely, those New Christian conversos who have remained as conversos since that time, both those in the Iberian Peninsula and those who moved to the Iberian colonial possessions during the Spanish colonization of the Americas, became the related Sephardic Bnei Anusim. Sephardic Bnei Anusim are the contemporary and largely nominally Christian descendants of assimilated 15th century Sephardic Anusim, and are today a fully assimilated sub-group within the Iberian-descended Christian populations of Spain, Portugal, Hispanic America and Brazil. For historical reasons and circumstances, Sephardic Bnei Anusim have not returned to the Jewish faith over the last five centuries, In modern times, some have begun emerging publicly in increasing numbers, especially in the last two decades.

For "Spanish and Portuguese Jews" (Western Sephardim), their historical period as conversos has shaped their identity, culture, and practices. In this respect, they are clearly distinguishable from those Sephardim who descend from the Jews who left Iberia as Jews before the expiration date for the Alhambra Decree, resulting in the 1492 expulsion from Spain and 1497 expulsion from Portugal of all Jews who had not been baptised into the Catholic faith. These expelled Jews settled mainly around the Mediterranean Basin of Southern Europe, North Africa and the Middle East, namely, Salonika, the Balkans and Turkey, and they became the Eastern Sephardim and North African Sephardim respectively. For centuries, the Sephardic Jewish communities under Ottoman rule provided spiritual leadership to the dispersed Sephardim through their contributions to the Responsa literature. These Sephardic communities offered refuge to all Jews, including the Sephardi Jewish-origin New Christian conversos fleeing the Inquisition across Europe, as well as their Eastern European Ashkenazi coreligionists fleeing pogroms.

==== Relation to Sephardic Bnei Anusim and Neo-Western Sephardim ====
The common feature shared by Western Sephardim ("Spanish and Portuguese Jews") to Sephardic Bnei Anusim and Neo-Western Sephardim is that all three are descended from conversos. "Western Sephardim" are descendants of former conversos of earlier centuries; "Sephardic Bnei Anusim" are the still nominally Christian descendants of conversos; and "Neo-Western Sephardim" are the increasing in number modern-day former conversos currently returning to Judaism from among the Sephardic Bnei Anusim population.

The distinguishing factor between "Western Sephardim" and the nascent "Neo-Western Sephardim" is the time frame of the reversions to Judaism, the location of the reversions, and the precarious religious and legal circumstances surrounding their reversions, including impediments and persecutions. Thus, the converso descendants who became the Western Sephardim had reverted to Judaism between the 16th and 18th centuries, they did so at a time before the abolition of the Inquisition in the 19th century, and this time frame necessitated their migration out of the Iberian cultural sphere. Conversely, the converso descendants who are today becoming the nascent Neo-Western Sephardim have been reverting to Judaism between the late 20th and early 21st centuries, they have been doing so at a time after the abolition of the Inquisition in the 19th century, and this time frame has not necessitated their migration out of the Iberian cultural sphere.

Although Jewish communities were re-established in Spain and Portugal in the late 19th and early 20th centuries, largely with the help of communities of Spanish and Portuguese Jews such as that in London, these present-day Jews in Portugal and Jews in Spain are distinct from "Spanish and Portuguese Jews" as, for the most part, the modern Jewish communities resident in Spain and Portugal also include other Jewish ethnic divisions recently immigrated to Spain and Portugal, such as Ashkenazi Jews of Northern Europe.

In modern Iberia, practicing Jews of Sephardic origins, such as the Jewish community of Oporto, however, are also not Western Sephardim, but are Neo-Western Sephardim, as they were re-established in the 20th century and early 21st centuries with a campaign of outreach to the crypto-Jews of Sephardic Bnei Anusim origins. The Oporto community's return to Judaism was led by the returnee to Judaism Captain Artur Carlos de Barros Basto (1887–1961), known also as the "apostle of the Marranos". In 1921, realizing that there were less than twenty Ashkenazi Jews living in Porto, and that recent returnees to Judaism like himself were not organized and had to travel to Lisbon for religious purposes whenever necessary, Barros Basto began to think about building a synagogue and took initiative in 1923 to officially register the Jewish Community of Porto and the Israelite Theological Center in the city council of Porto. As mentioned, these communities of modern-day returnees to Judaism are among the first in the emergence of the nascent Neo-Western Sephardim. Neo-Western Sephardim are the modern returnees to Judaism throughout Iberia and Ibero-America emerging from among the population of Sephardic Bnei Anusim, and are distinct from Western Sephardim (those termed "Spanish and Portuguese Jews").

Even more recent examples of such Neo-Western Sephardim communities include the Belmonte Jews in Portugal, and the Xuetes of Spain. In the case of the Xuetes, the entire community of converso descendants was extended a blanket recognition as Jews by Rabbinical authorities in Israel due to their particular historical circumstances on the island which effectively resulted in a strict social isolation of the Xuetes imposed upon them by their non-Jewish-descended neighbors up until modern times.

In the last five to ten years, "organized groups of [Sephardic] Benei Anusim have been established in Brazil, Colombia, Costa Rica, Chile, Ecuador, Mexico, Puerto Rico, Venezuela, and in Sefarad [the Iberian Peninsula] itself". Some members of these communities have formally reverted to Judaism.

In 2015, the Spanish government enacted a law conceding Spanish nationality to the descendants of Sephardic Jews of Spanish origin. The law created a powerful incentive for the descendants of B'nei Anusim to re-discover their Sephardic ancestry, and it spurred a wave of genealogical inquiry and even genetic research. The law remained in force until 2019, therefore applications for Spanish citizenship on the basis of Sephardic ancestry are no longer accepted by the Spanish authorities.

== History in different countries ==
=== In Spain and Portugal ===
Spanish and Portuguese Jews were originally descended from New Christian conversos (i.e. Jews converted to Roman Catholic Christianity) whose descendants later left the Iberian Peninsula and reverted to Judaism.

Although legend has it that conversos existed as early as the Visigothic period, and that there was a continuous phenomenon of crypto-Judaism from that time lasting throughout Spanish history, this scenario is unlikely, as in the Muslim period of Iberia there was no advantage in passing as a Christian instead of publicly acknowledging one was a Jew. The main wave of conversions, often forced, followed the Massacre of 1391 in Spain. Legal definitions of that era theoretically acknowledged that a forced baptism was not a valid sacrament, but the Church confined this to cases where it was literally administered by physical force: a person who had consented to baptism under threat of death or serious injury was still regarded as a voluntary convert, and accordingly forbidden to revert to Judaism. Crypto-Judaism as a large-scale phenomenon mainly dates from that time.

Conversos, whatever their real religious views, often (but not always) tended to marry and associate among themselves. As they achieved prominent positions in trade and in the royal administration, they attracted considerable resentment from the "Old Christians". The ostensible reason given for issuance of the 1492 Alhambra Decree for the conversion, expulsion or execution of the unconverted Jews from Spain was that the unconverted Jews had supported the New Christian conversos in the crypto-Jewish practices of the latter, thus delaying or preventing their assimilation into the Christian community.

After the issuance of Spain's Alhambra Decree in 1492, a large proportion of the unconverted Jews chose exile rather than conversion, many of them crossing the border to Portugal. In Portugal, however, the Jews were again issued with a similar decree just a few years later in 1497, giving them the choice of exile or conversion. Unlike in Spain, however, in actual practice Portugal mostly prevented them from leaving, thus they necessarily stayed as ostensible converts to Christianity whether they wished to or not, after the Portuguese King reasoned that by their failure to leave they accepted Christianity by default. For this reason, crypto-Judaism was far more prevalent in Portugal than in Spain, even though many of these families were originally of Spanish rather than Portuguese descent. Over time, however, most crypto-Jews both of Spanish and Portuguese ancestry had left Portugal by the 18th century.

==== Crypto-Judaism ====
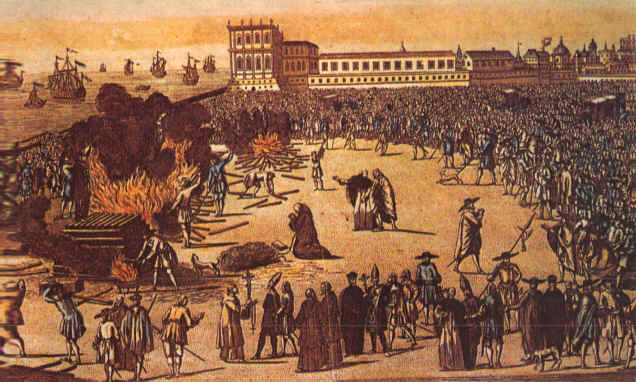
Burning of Crypto-Jews in Lisbon, Portugal, 1497

Scholars are still divided on the typical religious loyalties of the conversos, in particular on whether they are appropriately described as "crypto-Jews". Given the secrecy surrounding their situation, the question is not easy to answer: probably the conversos themselves were divided, and could be ranged at different points between the possible positions. The suggested profiles are as follows:

1. Sincere Christians, who were still subject to discrimination and accusations of Judaizing on the part of the Inquisition; some of these appealed to the Pope and sought refuge in the Papal States.
2. Those who had honestly tried their best to live as Christians, but who, on finding that they were still not accepted socially and still suspected of Judaizing, conceived intellectual doubts on the subject and decided to try Judaism, on the reasoning that suspicion creates what it suspects.
3. Genuine crypto-Jews, who regarded their conversions as forced on them and reluctantly conformed to Catholicism until they found the first opportunity of living an open Jewish life.
4. Opportunistic "cultural commuters" whose private views may have been quite sceptical and who conformed to the local form of Judaism or Christianity depending on where they were at the time.

For these reasons, there was a continuous flow of people leaving Spain and Portugal (mostly Portugal) for places where they could practice Judaism openly, from 1492 until the end of the 18th century. The typical escape route was, first, to Antwerp (or sometimes London), then to Ferrara or Venice, from which they might or might not travel on to the Ottoman Empire; later on, permanent communities were founded in the Netherlands and England. They were generally accepted by the host Jewish communities as anusim (forced converts), whose conversion, being involuntary, did not compromise their Jewish status.

Conversos of the first generation after the expulsion still had some knowledge of Judaism based on memory of contact with a living Jewish community. In later generations, people had to avoid known Jewish practices that might attract undesired attention: conversos in group 3 evolved a home-made Judaism with practices peculiar to themselves, while those in group 2 had a purely intellectual conception of Judaism based on their reading of ancient Jewish sources preserved by the Church such as the Vulgate Old Testament, the Apocrypha, Philo and Josephus. Both groups therefore needed extensive re-education in Judaism after reaching their places of refuge outside the peninsula. This was achieved with the help of

- Sephardim living in Italy (and to a lesser extent, Italian Jews proper);
- 1492 exiles living in Morocco, who were the immediate heirs of the Andalusi Jewish tradition;
- especially in Holland and Germany, Ashkenazi Jews.

==== Ceuta and Melilla ====
There are still Jewish communities in the North African exclaves of Ceuta and Melilla. These places, though treated in most respects as integral parts of Spain, escaped the Inquisition and the expulsion, so these communities regard themselves as the remnant of pre-expulsion Spanish Jewry.

=== In Italy ===
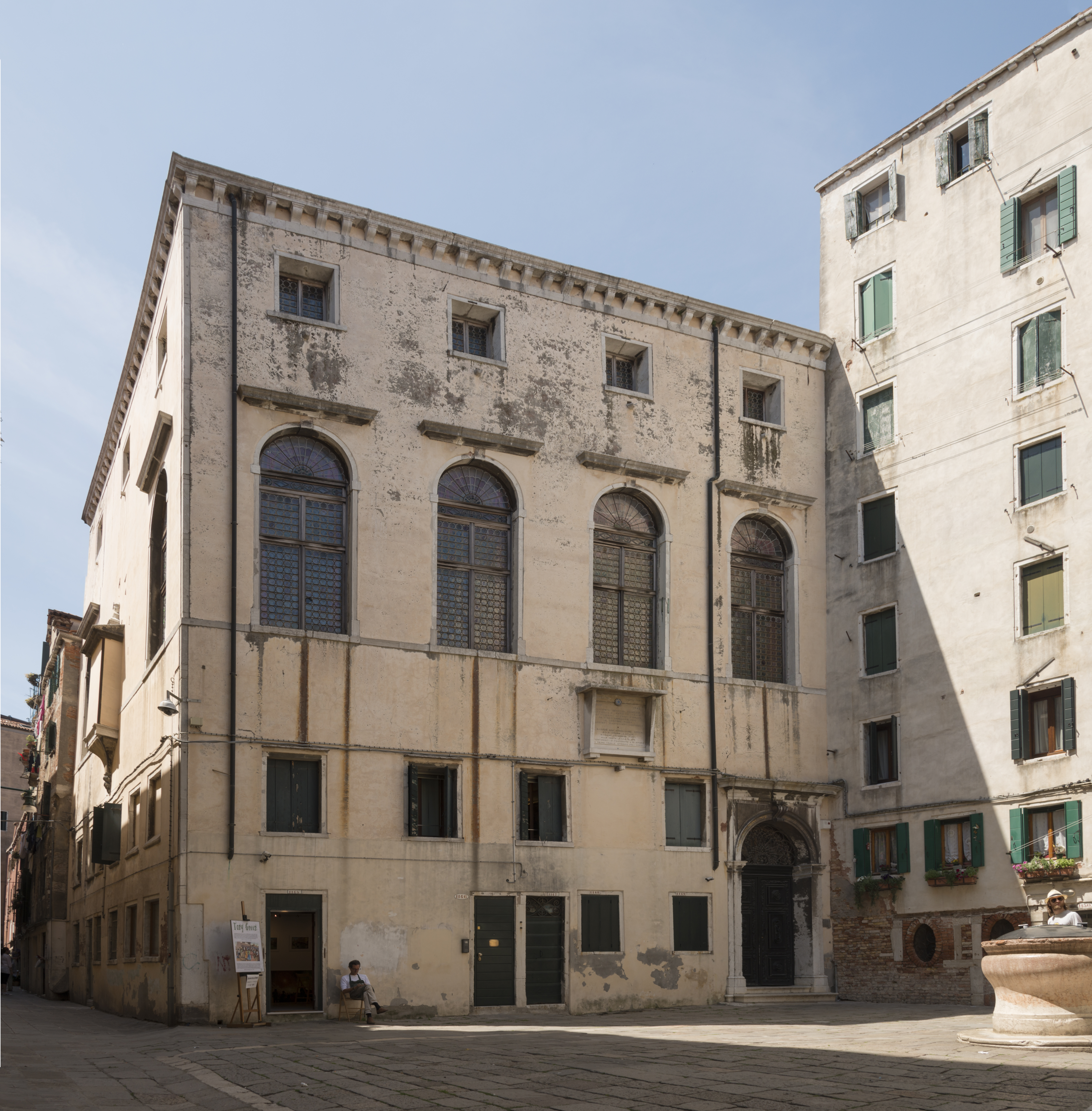
Spanish Synagogue

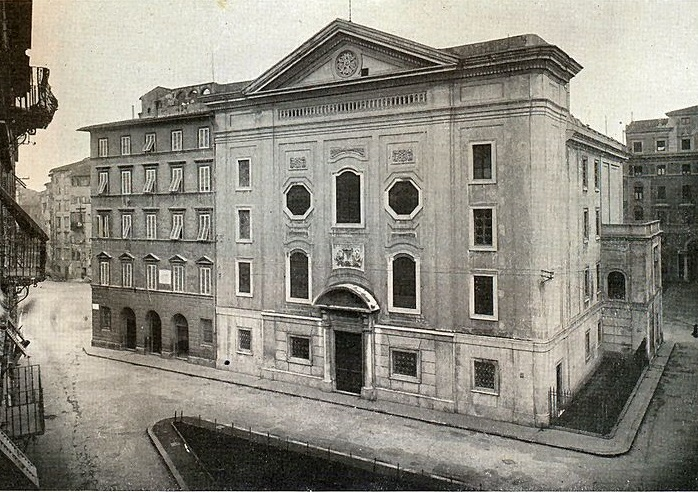
Synagogue of Livorno

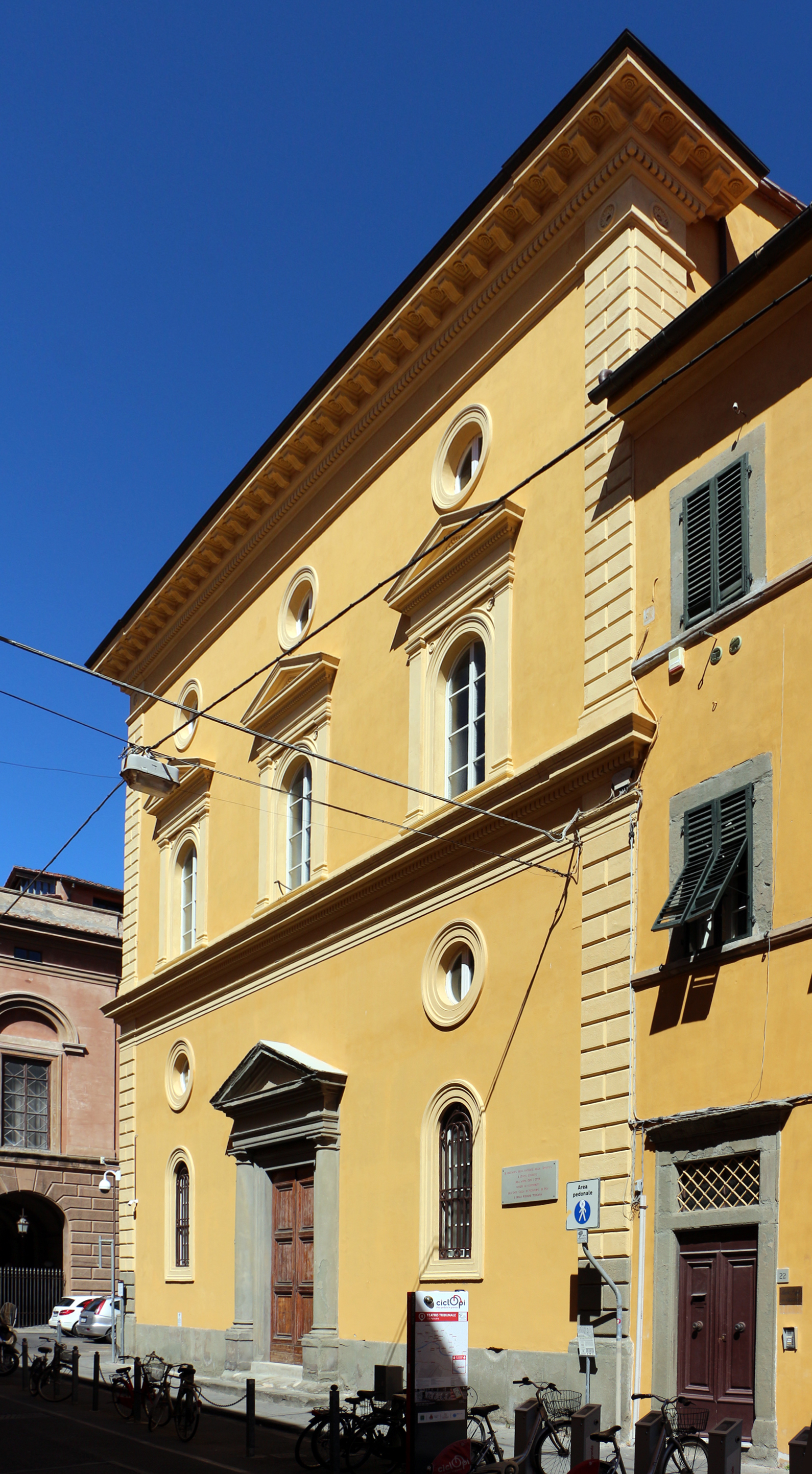
Synagogue of Pisa

As Sephardic Jewish communities were established in central and northern Italy, following the expulsion of the Jews from Spain in 1492 and from the Kingdom of Naples in 1533, these areas were an obvious destination for conversos wishing to leave Spain and Portugal. The similarity of the Italian language to Spanish was another attraction. Given their Christian cultural background and high level of European-style education, the new emigrants were less likely to follow the example of the 1492 expellees by settling in the Ottoman Empire, where a complete culture change would be required.

On the other hand, in Italy they ran the risk of prosecution for Judaizing, given that in law they were baptized Christians; for this reason they generally avoided the Papal States. The Popes did allow some Spanish-Jewish settlement at Ancona, as this was the main port for the Turkey trade, in which their links with the Ottoman Sephardim were useful. Other states found it advantageous to allow the conversos to settle and mix with the existing Jewish communities, and to turn a blind eye to their religious status. In the next generation, the children of conversos could be brought up as fully Jewish with no legal problem, as they had never been baptized.

The main places of settlement were as follows:

1. The Republic of Venice often had strained relations with the papacy. They were also alive to the commercial advantages offered by the presence of educated Spanish-speaking Jews, especially for the Turkey trade. Previously the Jews of Venice were tolerated under charters for a fixed term of years, periodically renewed. In the early 16th century, these arrangements were made permanent, and a separate charter was granted to the "Ponentine" (western) community. Around the same time, the state required the Jews to live in the newly established Venetian Ghetto. Nevertheless, for a long time the Venetian Republic was regarded as the most welcoming state for Jews, equivalent to the Netherlands in the 17th century or the United States in the 20th century.
2. Sephardic immigration was also encouraged by the House of Este in their possessions of Reggio, Modena and Ferrara. In 1598 Ferrara was repossessed by the Papal States, leading to some Jewish emigration from there.
3. In 1593, Ferdinando I de' Medici, Grand Duke of Tuscany, granted Spanish and Portuguese Jews charters to live and trade in Pisa and Livorno.

On the whole, the Spanish and Portuguese Jews remained separate from the native Italian rite Jews, though there was considerable mutual religious and intellectual influence between the groups. In a given city, there was often an "Italian synagogue" and a "Spanish synagogue", and occasionally a "German synagogue" as well. Many of these synagogues have since merged, but the diversity of rites survived in modern Italy.

The Spanish Synagogue (Scola Spagnola) of Venice was originally regarded as the "mother synagogue" for the Spanish and Portuguese community worldwide, as it was among the earliest to be established, and the first prayer book was published there. Later communities, such as in Amsterdam, followed its lead on ritual questions. With the decline in the importance of Venice in the 18th century, the leading role passed to Livorno (for Italy and the Mediterranean) and Amsterdam (for western countries). Unfortunately, the Livorno synagogue – considered to be the most important building in town – was destroyed in the Second World War: a modern building was erected on the same site in 1958–1962.

Many merchants maintained a presence in both Italy and countries in the Ottoman Empire, and even those who settled permanently in the Ottoman Empire retained their Tuscan or other Italian nationality, so as to have the benefit of the capitulations of the Ottoman Empire. Thus, in Tunisia there was a community of Juifs Portugais, or L'Grana (Livornese), separate from, and regarding itself as superior to, the native Tunisian Jews (Tuansa). Smaller communities of the same kind existed in other countries, such as Syria, where they were known as Señores Francos. They were generally not numerous enough to establish their own synagogues, instead meeting for prayer in each other's houses.

=== In France ===
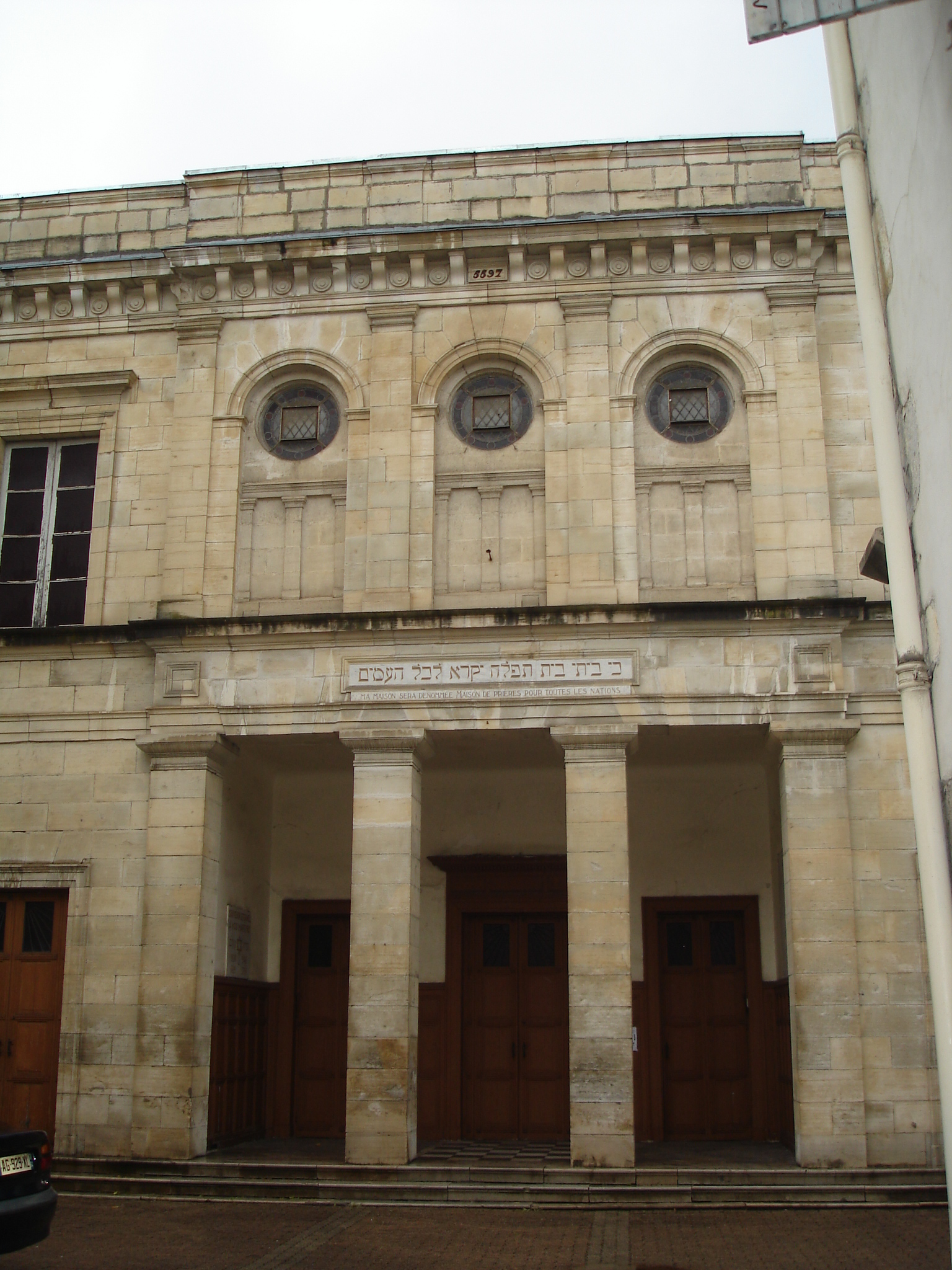
Synagogue of Bayonne

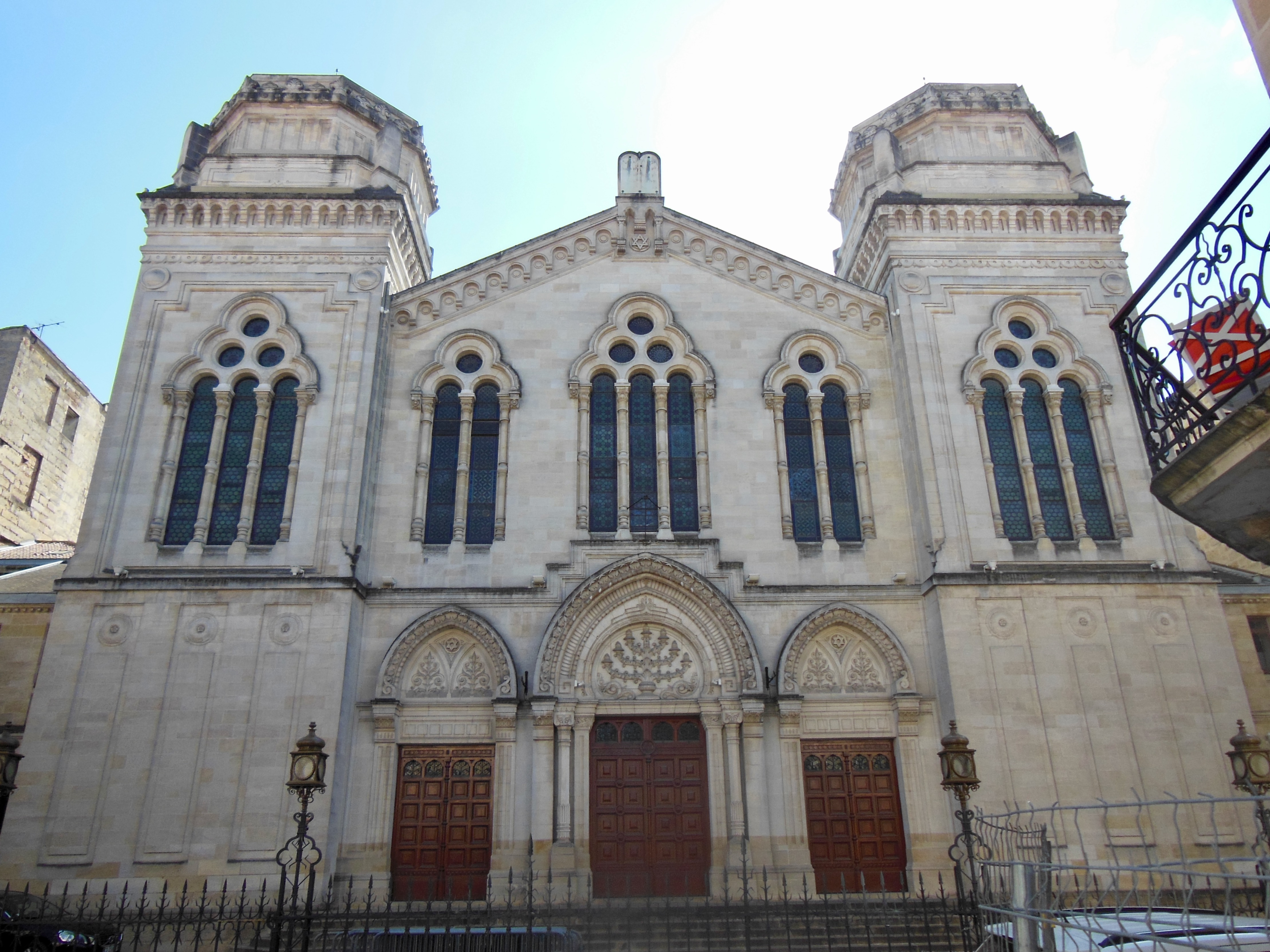
Great Synagogue of Bordeaux

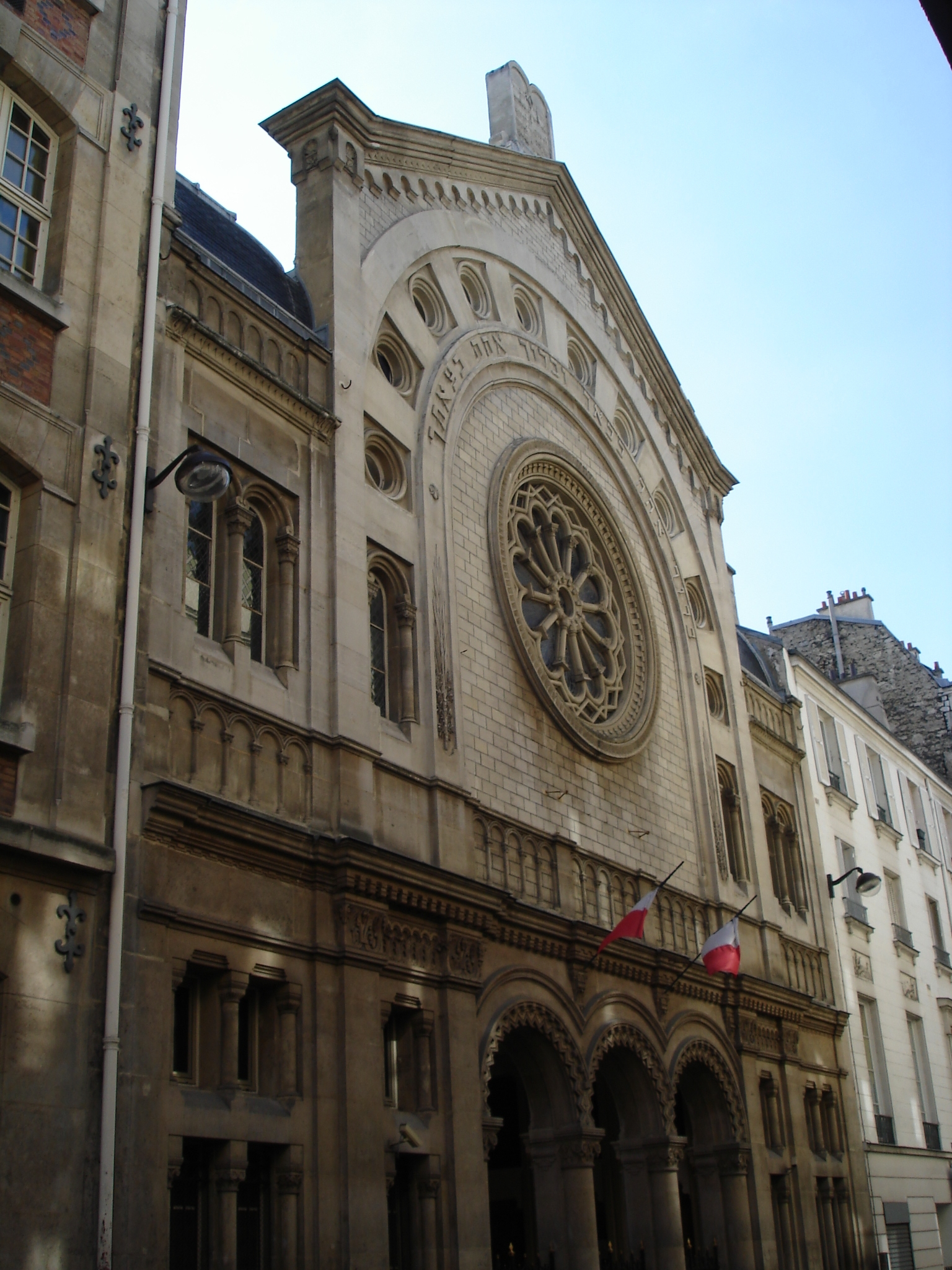
Synagogue Buffault

In the 16th and early 17th centuries, conversos were also seeking refuge beyond the Pyrenees, settling in France at Saint-Jean-de-Luz, Tarbes, Bayonne, Bordeaux, Marseille, and Montpellier. They lived apparently as Christians; were married by Catholic priests; had their children baptized, and publicly pretended to be Catholics. In secret, however, they circumcised their children, kept Shabbat and feast-days as best they could, and prayed together.

King Henri III confirmed the privileges granted them by Henri II, and protected them against accusations. Under Louis XIII, the conversos of Bayonne were assigned to the suburb of Saint-Esprit. At Saint-Esprit, as well as at Peyrehorade, Bidache, Orthez, Biarritz, and Saint-Jean-de-Luz, they gradually avowed Judaism openly. In 1640 several hundred conversos, considered to be Jews, were living at Saint-Jean-de-Luz; and a synagogue existed in Saint-Esprit as early as 1660.

In pre-Revolutionary France, the Portuguese Jews were one of two tolerated Jewish communities, the other being the Ashkenazi Jews of Alsace-Lorraine; both groups were emancipated at the French Revolution. The third community was that of the Papal exclave Comtat Venaissin, they originally had their own Provençal rite, but adopted the Spanish and Portuguese rite shortly after the French Revolution and the incorporation of Comtat Venaissin into France. Today there are still a few Spanish and Portuguese communities in Bordeaux and Bayonne, and one in Paris, but in all these communities (and still more among French Jews generally) any surviving Spanish and Portuguese Jews are greatly outnumbered by recent Sephardic migrants of North African origin.

=== In the Netherlands ===
During the Spanish occupation of the Netherlands, converso merchants had a strong trading presence there. When the Dutch Republic gained independence in 1581, the Dutch retained trading links with Portugal rather than Spain, as Spain was regarded as a hostile power. Since there were penal laws against Catholics, and Catholicism was regarded with greater hostility than Judaism, New Christian conversos (technically Catholics, as that was the Christian tradition they were forced into) were encouraged by the Dutch to "come out" openly as Jews. Given the multiplicity of Protestant sects, the Netherlands was the first country in the Western world to establish a policy of religious tolerance. This made Amsterdam a magnet for conversos leaving Portugal.

There were originally three Sephardi communities: the first, Beth Jacob, already existed in 1610, and perhaps as early as 1602; Neve Shalom was founded between 1608 and 1612 by Jews of Spanish origin. The third community, Beth Israel, was established in 1618. These three communities began co-operating more closely in 1622. Eventually, in 1639, they merged to form Talmud Torah, the Portuguese Jewish Community of Amsterdam, which still exists today. The current Portuguese Synagogue, sometimes known as the "Amsterdam Esnoga", was inaugurated in 1675, of which Abraham Cohen Pimentel was the head Rabbi.

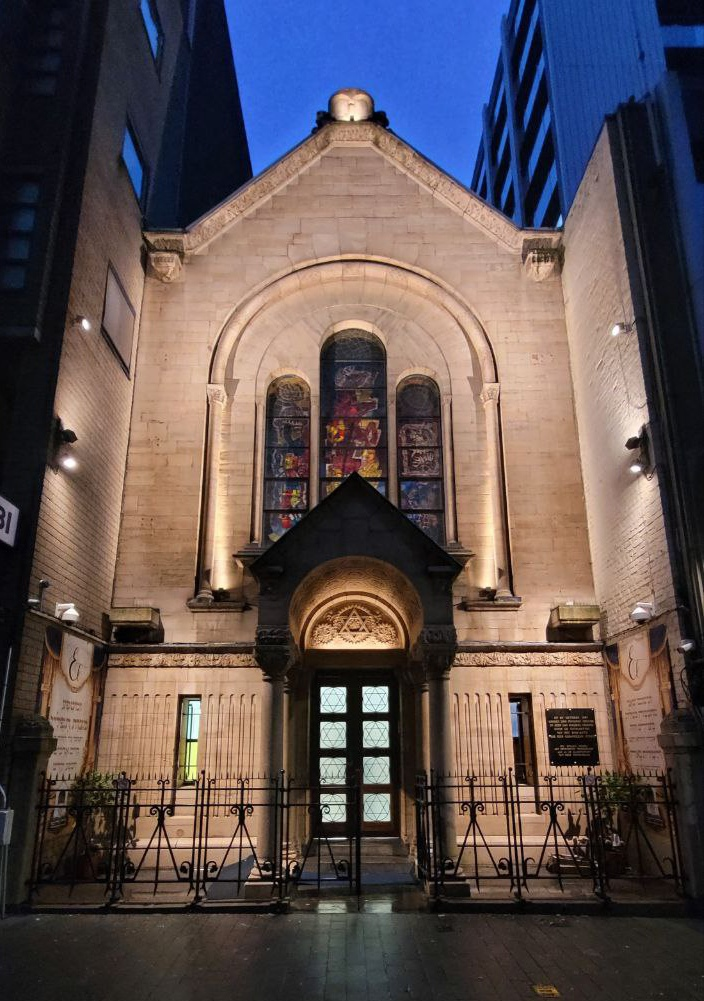
Portuguese Synagogue of Antwerp

At first the Dutch conversos had little knowledge of Judaism and had to recruit rabbis and hazzanim from Italy, and occasionally Morocco and Salonica, to teach them. Later on Amsterdam became a centre of religious learning: a religious college Ets Haim was established, with a copious Jewish and general library. This library still exists. The transactions of the college, mainly in the form of responsa, were published in a periodical, Peri Ets Haim (see links below). There were formerly several Portuguese synagogues in other cities such as The Hague. Since the German occupation of the Netherlands in the Second World War and the mass killing of Jews by the Nazi regime, the Amsterdam synagogue is the only remaining synagogue of the Portuguese rite in the Netherlands: it serves a membership of about 600. On the other hand, the synagogue at the Hague survived the war undamaged; it is now the Liberal Synagogue and no longer belongs to the "Portuguese" community.

The position of Jews in the Spanish Netherlands (modern Belgium) was rather different. Considerable numbers of conversos lived there, in particular in Antwerp. The Inquisition was not allowed to operate, though there were sometimes prosecutions for heresy in the local courts. Nevertheless, their practice of Judaism remained under cover and unofficial, as acts of Judaizing in Belgium could expose one to proceedings elsewhere in the Spanish possessions. Sporadic persecutions alternated with periods of unofficial toleration. The position improved somewhat in 1714, with the cession of the southern Netherlands to Austria, but no community was officially formed until the 19th century. There is a Portuguese synagogue in Antwerp; its members, like those of the Sephardic rite synagogues of Brussels, are now predominantly of North African origin, and few if any pre-War families or traditions remain.

=== In Germany, Northern Europe and Eastern Europe ===
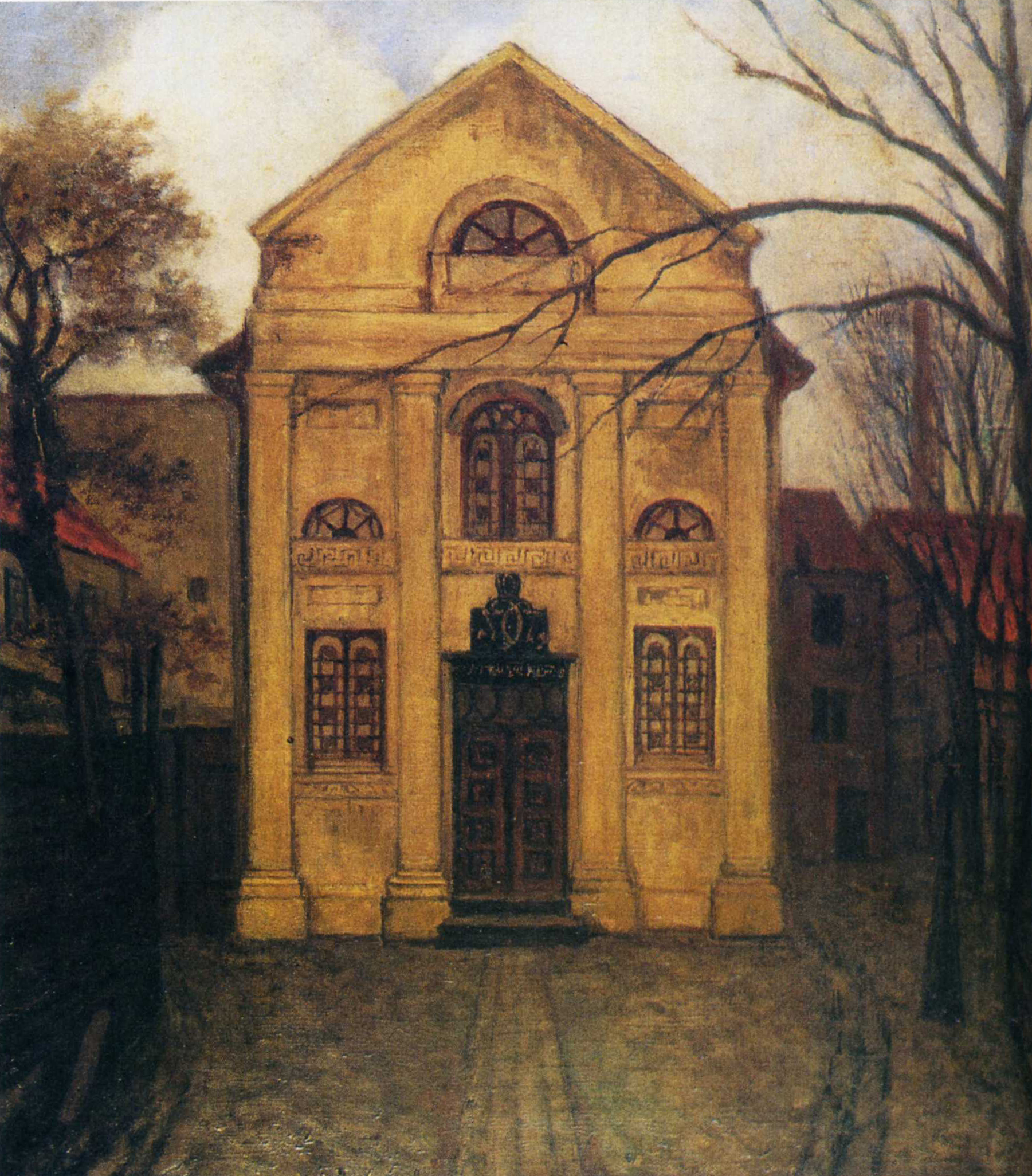
The main façade of stone of the else half-timbered Portuguese synagogue Neveh Shalom in the courtyard of then Bäckerstr. 12-14 (today's Hoheschulstr.), Altona, dedicated in 1771, closed in 1882. Thereafter Altona's Ashkenazi congregation used the building as winter synagogue, before it was demolished in 1940.

There were Portuguese Jews living in Hamburg as early as the 1590s. Records attest to their having a small synagogue called Talmud Torah in 1627, and the main synagogue, Beth Israel, was founded in 1652. From the 18th century on, the Portuguese Jews were increasingly outnumbered by "German Jews" (Ashkenazim). By 1900, they were thought to number only about 400.

A small branch of the Portuguese community was located in Altona, with a congregation known as Neweh Schalom. Historically, however, the Jewish community of Altona was overwhelmingly Ashkenazi, as Altona belonged to the kingdom of Denmark, which permitted Jews of all communities to settle there when Hamburg proper still only admitted the Portuguese.

Spanish and Portuguese Jews had an intermittent trading presence in Norway until the early 19th century, and were granted full residence rights in 1844. Today they have no separate organizational identity from the general (mainly Ashkenazi) Jewish community, though traditions survive in some families.

Around 1550, many Sephardi Jews travelled across Europe to find their haven in Poland, which had the largest Jewish population in the whole of Europe during the 16th and 17th centuries. For this reason there are still Polish Jewish surnames with a possible Spanish origin. However, most of them quickly assimilated into the Ashkenazi community and retained no separate identity.

=== In Britain ===
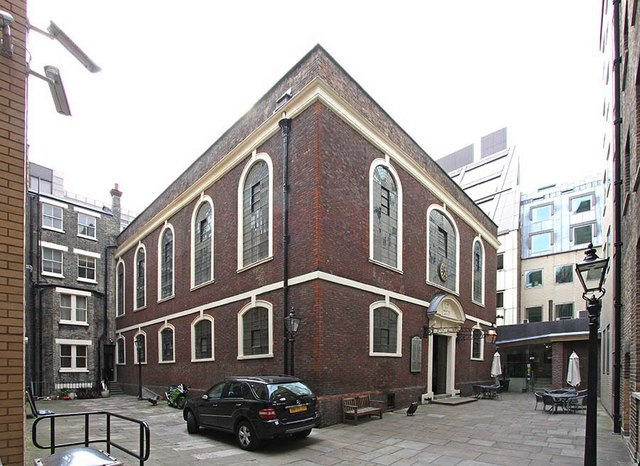
Exterior of the Bevis Marks Synagogue

There were certainly Spanish and Portuguese merchants, many of them conversos, in England at the time of Queen Elizabeth I; one notable marrano was the physician Roderigo Lopez. In the time of Oliver Cromwell, Menasseh Ben Israel led a delegation seeking permission for Dutch Sephardim to settle in England: Cromwell was known to look favourably on the request, but no official act of permission has been found. By the time of Charles II and James II, a congregation of Spanish and Portuguese Jews had a synagogue in Creechurch Lane. Both these kings showed their assent to this situation by quashing indictments against the Jews for unlawful assembly. For this reason the Spanish and Portuguese Jews of England often cite 1656 as the year of re-admission, but look to Charles II as the real sponsor of their community.

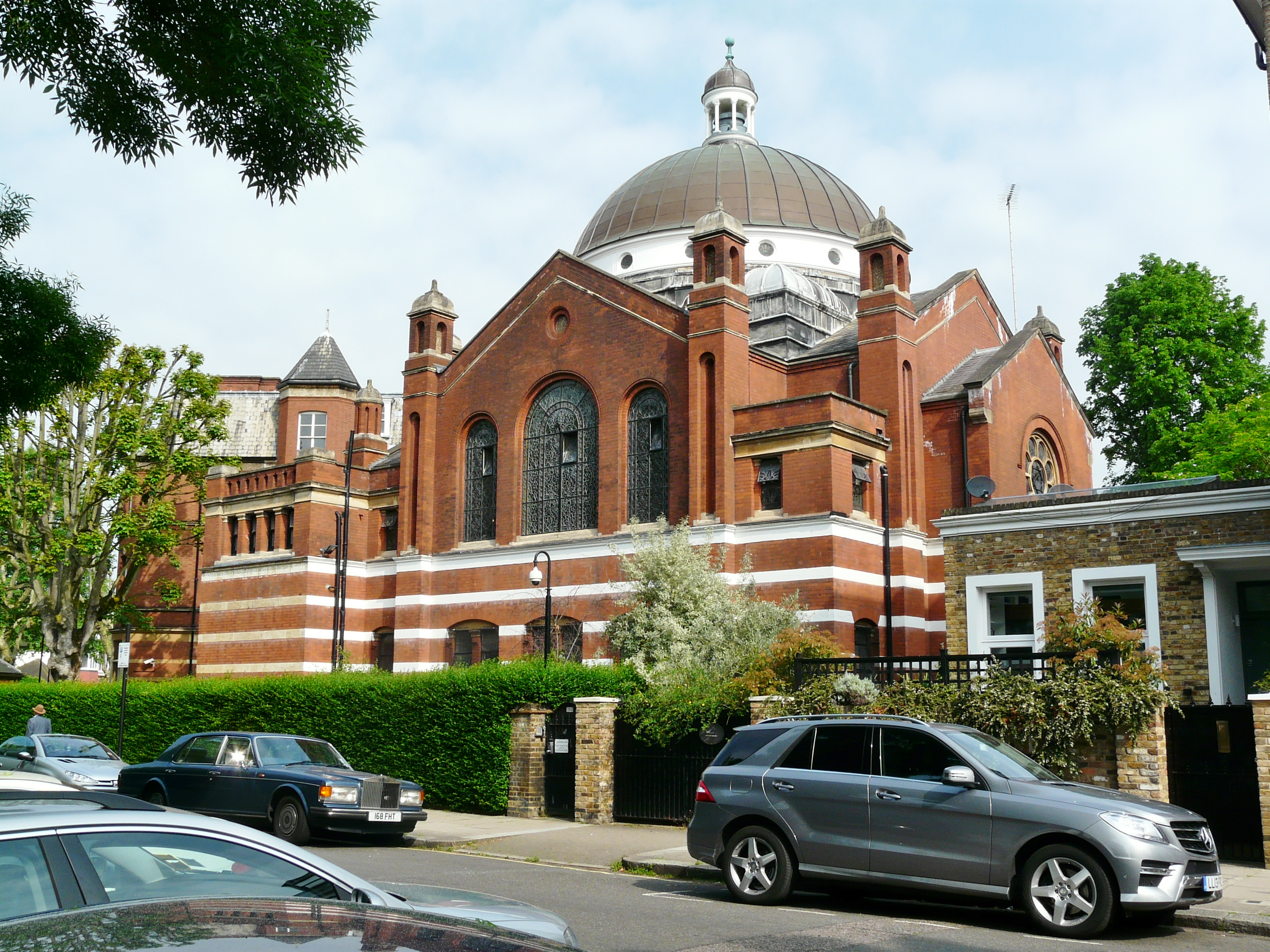
Lauderdale Road Spanish & Portuguese Synagogue

Bevis Marks Synagogue was opened in 1701 in London. In the 1830s and 40s there was agitation for the formation of a branch synagogue in the West End, nearer where most congregants lived, but rabbis refused this on the basis of Ascama 1, forbidding the establishment of other synagogues within six miles of Bevis Marks. Dissident congregants, together with some Ashkenazim, accordingly founded the West London Synagogue in Burton Street in 1841. An official branch synagogue in Wigmore Street was opened in 1853. This moved to Bryanston Street in the 1860s, and to Lauderdale Road in Maida Vale in 1896. A private synagogue existed in Islington from 1865 to 1884, and another in Highbury from 1885 to 1936. A third synagogue has been formed in Wembley. Over the centuries the community has absorbed many Sephardi immigrants from Italy and North Africa, including many of its rabbis and hazzanim. The current membership includes many Iraqi Jews and some Ashkenazim, in addition to descendants of the original families. The Wembley community is predominantly Egyptian.

The synagogues at Bevis Marks, Lauderdale Road and Wembley are all owned by the same community, formally known as Sahar Asamaim (Sha'ar ha-Shamayim), and have no separate organisational identities. The community is served by a team rabbinate: the post of Haham, or chief rabbi, is currently vacant (and has frequently been so in the community's history), the current head being known as the "Senior Rabbi". The day-to-day running of the community is the responsibility of a Mahamad, elected periodically and consisting of a number of parnasim (wardens) and one gabbay (treasurer). Under the current Senior Rabbi, Joseph Dweck, the name of the community has been changed from "Congregation of Spanish and Portuguese Jews" to "S&P Sephardi Community".

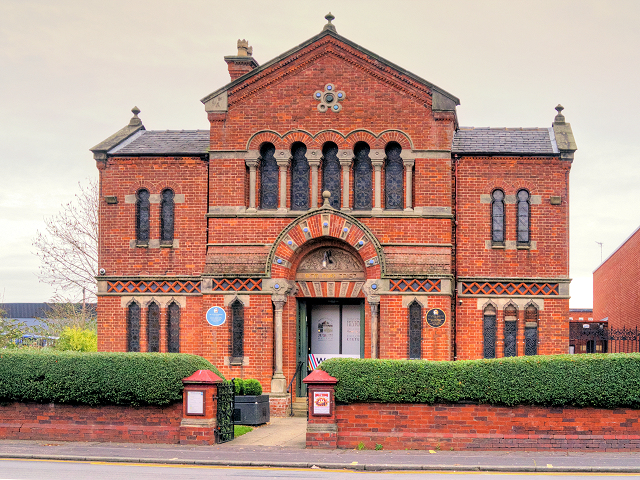
Manchester Jewish Museum, formerly a Spanish and Portuguese synagogue

In addition to the three main synagogues, there is the Montefiore Synagogue at Ramsgate associated with the burial place of Moses Montefiore. A synagogue in Holland Park is described as "Spanish and Portuguese" but serves chiefly Greek and Turkish Jews, with a mixed ritual: it is connected to the main community by a Deed of Association. The Manchester Sephardic synagogues are under the superintendence of the London community and traditionally used a predominantly Spanish and Portuguese ritual, which is giving way to a Jerusalem Sephardic style: the membership is chiefly Syrian in heritage, with some Turkish, Iraqi and North African Jews. The London community formerly had oversight over some Baghdadi synagogues in the Far East, such as the Ohel Leah Synagogue in Hong Kong and Ohel Rachel Synagogue in Shanghai. An informal community using the Spanish and Portuguese rite, and known as the "Rambam Synagogue", exists in Elstree and a further minyan has been established in Hendon. Newer Sephardic rite synagogues in London, mostly for Baghdadi and Persian Jews, preserve their own ritual and do not come under the Spanish and Portuguese umbrella.

Like the Amsterdam community, the London Spanish and Portuguese community early set up a Medrash do Heshaim (Ets Haim). This is less a functioning religious college than a committee of dignitaries responsible for community publications, such as prayer books. In 1862 the community founded the "Judith Lady Montefiore College" in Ramsgate, for the training of rabbis. This moved to London in the 1960s: students at the college concurrently followed courses at Jews' College (now the London School of Jewish Studies). Judith Lady Montefiore College closed in the 1980s, but was revived in 2005 as a part-time rabbinic training programme run from Lauderdale Road, serving the Anglo-Jewish Orthodox community in general, Ashkenazim as well as Sephardim.

=== In the Americas ===
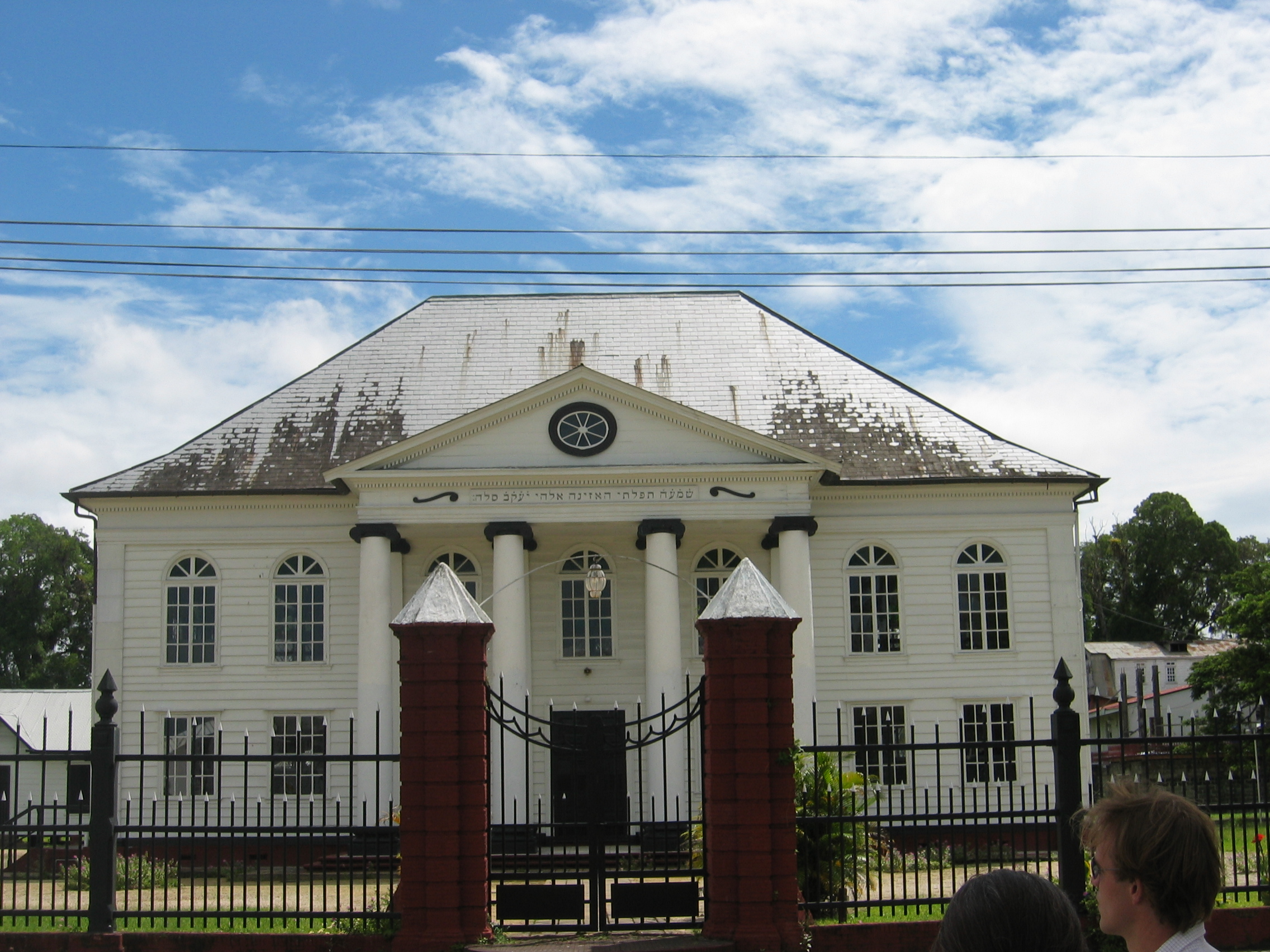
Neveh Shalom Synagogue, Paramaribo, Suriname

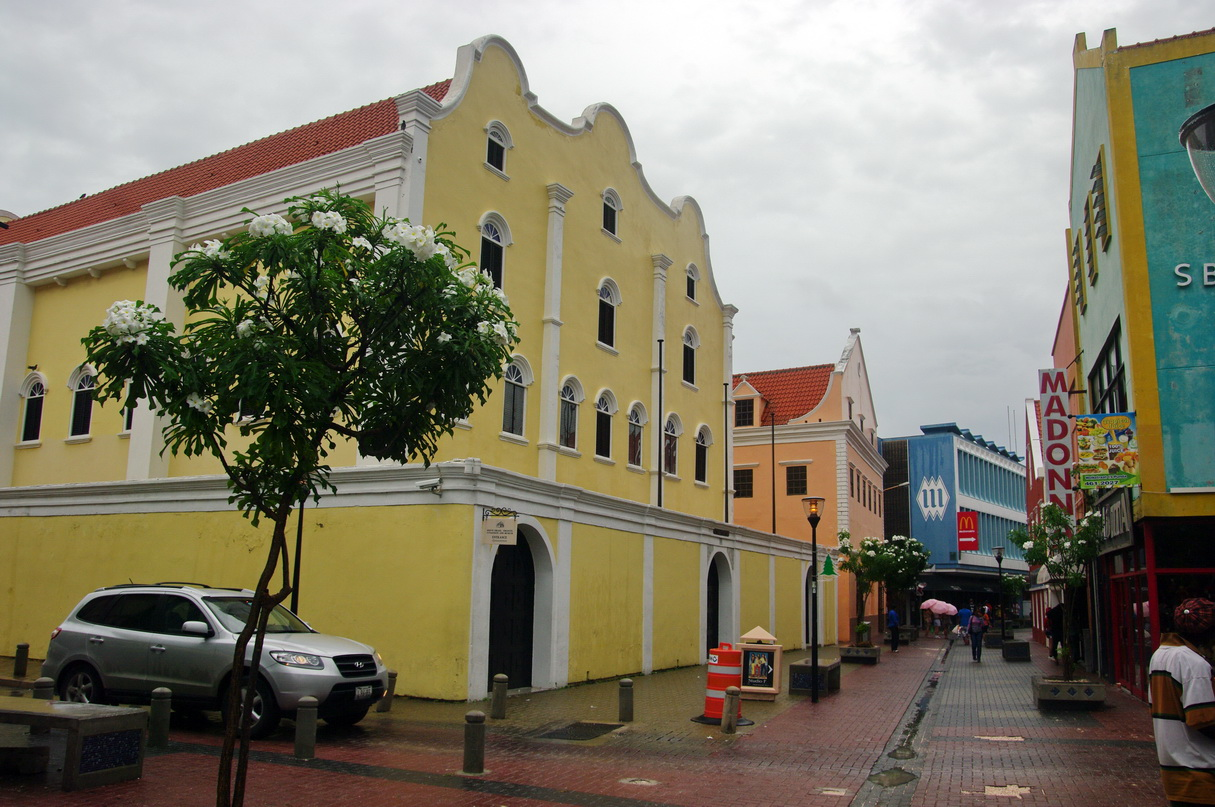
The Mikvé Israel-Emanuel Synagogue, in Willemstad, Curaçao

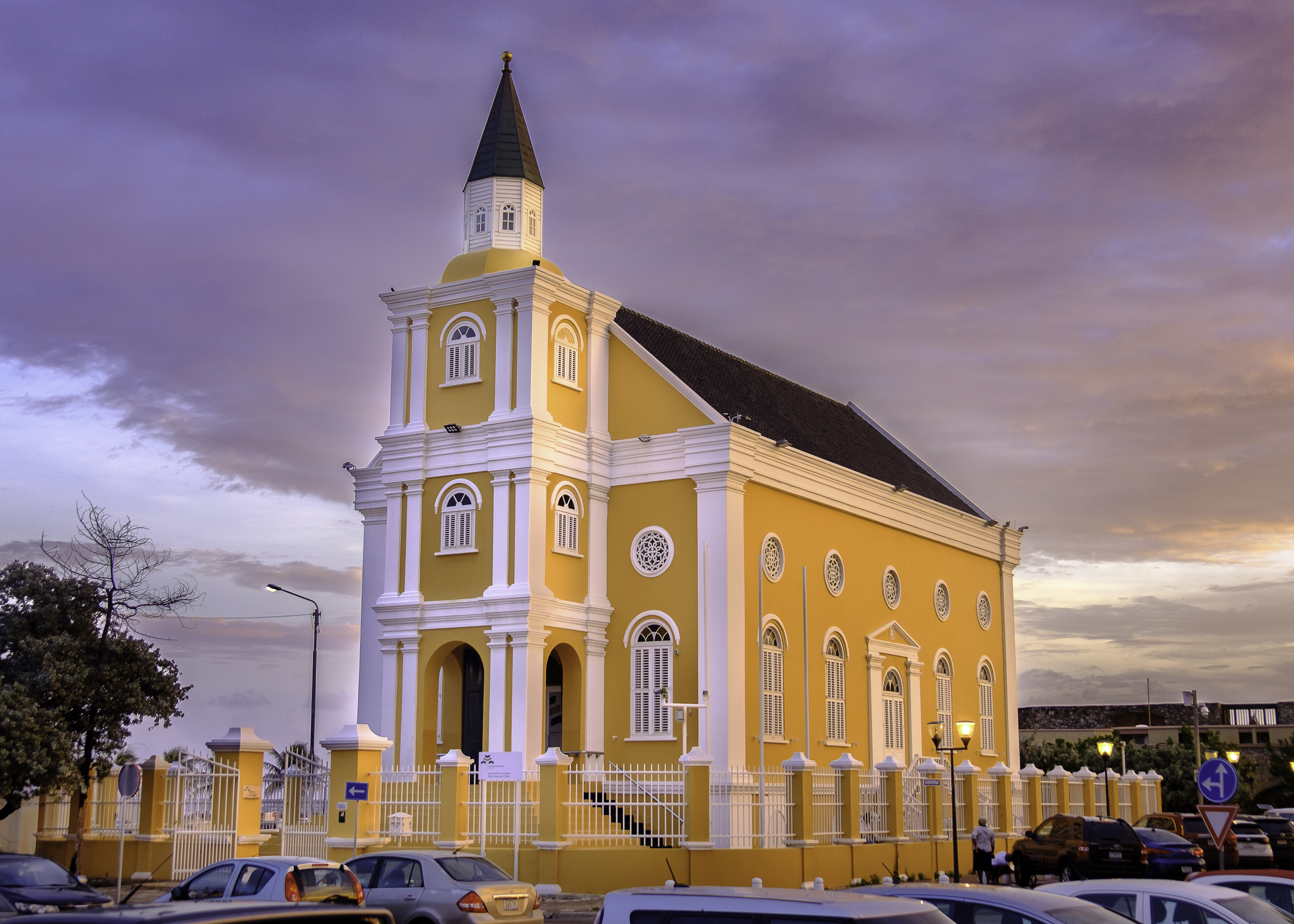
Temple Emanuel, in Willemstad, Curaçao

From the 16th to the 18th centuries, a majority of conversos leaving Portugal went to Brazil. This included economic emigrants with no interest in reverting to Judaism. As the Inquisition was active in Brazil as well as in Portugal, conversos still had to be careful.

Dutch Sephardim were interested in colonisation, and formed communities in both Curaçao and Paramaribo, Suriname. Between 1630 and 1654, a Dutch colony existed in the north-east of Brazil, including Recife. This attracted both conversos from Portuguese Brazil and Jewish emigrants from Holland, who formed a community in Recife called Kahal Zur Israel Synagogue, the first synagogue in the Americas. On the reconquest of the Recife area by Portugal, many of these Jews (it is not known what percentage) left Brazil for new or existing communities in the Caribbean such as Curaçao. Others formed a new community, Congregation Shearith Israel, in New Amsterdam (later renamed as New York) in 1654, the first Jewish synagogue in what became the United States. Numerous conversos, however, stayed in Brazil. They survived by migrating to the countryside in the province of Paraíba and away from the reinstated Inquisition, which was mostly active in the major cities.

In the Caribbean, there were at one point Spanish and Portuguese synagogues in various other Dutch- and English-controlled islands, such as Jamaica, St. Thomas, Barbados, St. Eustatius and Nevis. With the elimination of the Inquisition after the Spanish American wars of independence, which many Caribbean Sephardim had supported, many of these communities declined as Jews took advantage of their new-found freedom to move to the mainland, where there were better economic opportunities. Venezuela, Colombia, Ecuador, Panama, Costa Rica and Honduras, among others, received numbers of Sephardim. Within a couple of generations, these immigrants mostly converted to Catholicism to better integrate into society. In the 21st century among the Caribbean islands, only Curaçao and Jamaica still have communities of Spanish and Portuguese Jews.

In Canada, at that time named as 'New France', Esther Brandeau was the first Jew to immigrate to Canada, in 1738, disguised as a Roman Catholic boy. She came from Saint-Esprit, a district of Bayonne, a port city in Southwestern France, where Spanish and Portuguese Jews had settled.

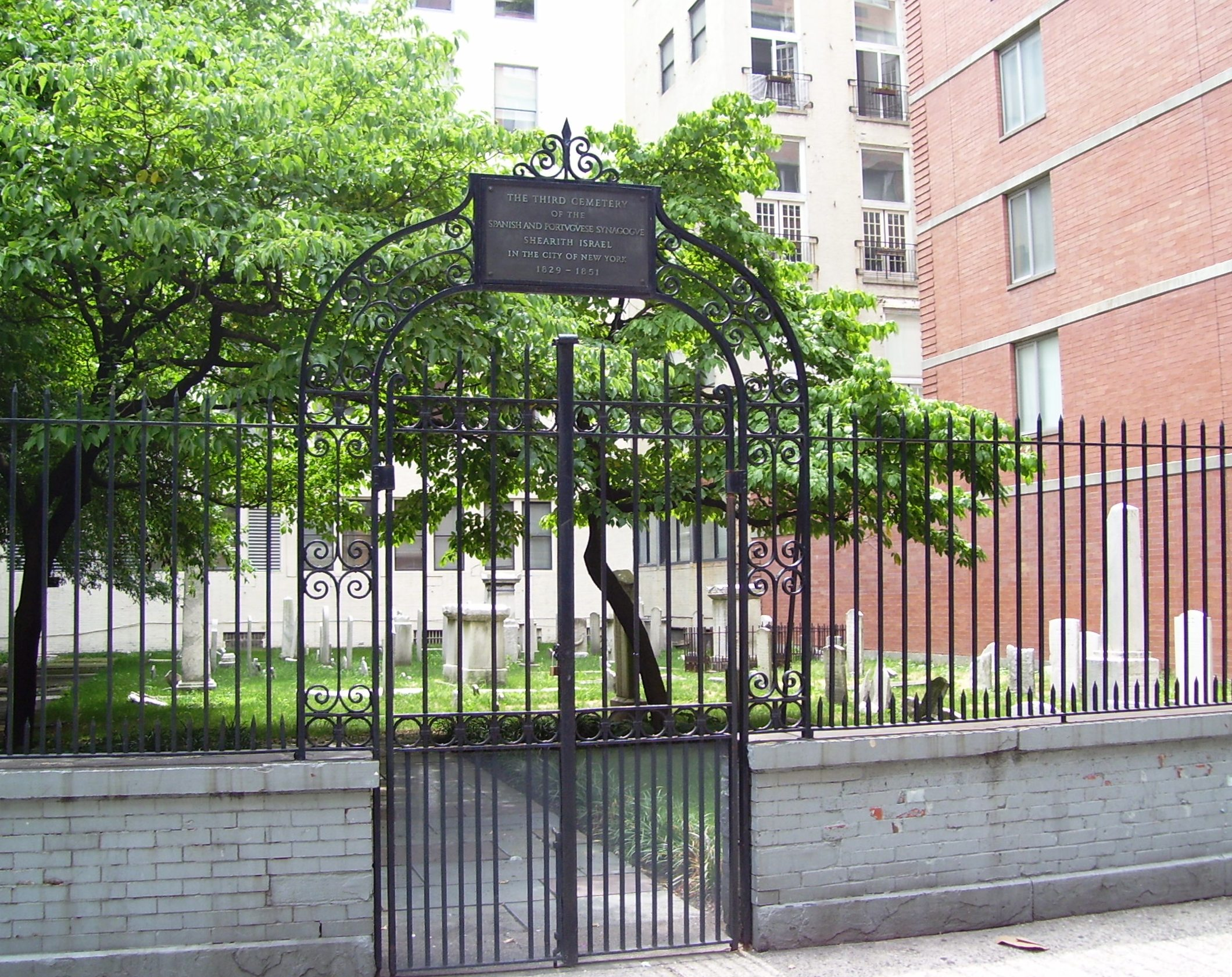
The Third Cemetery of the Spanish and Portuguese Synagogue, Congregation Shearith Israel (1829–1851) on West 21st Street in Manhattan, New York City is now surrounded by tall buildings

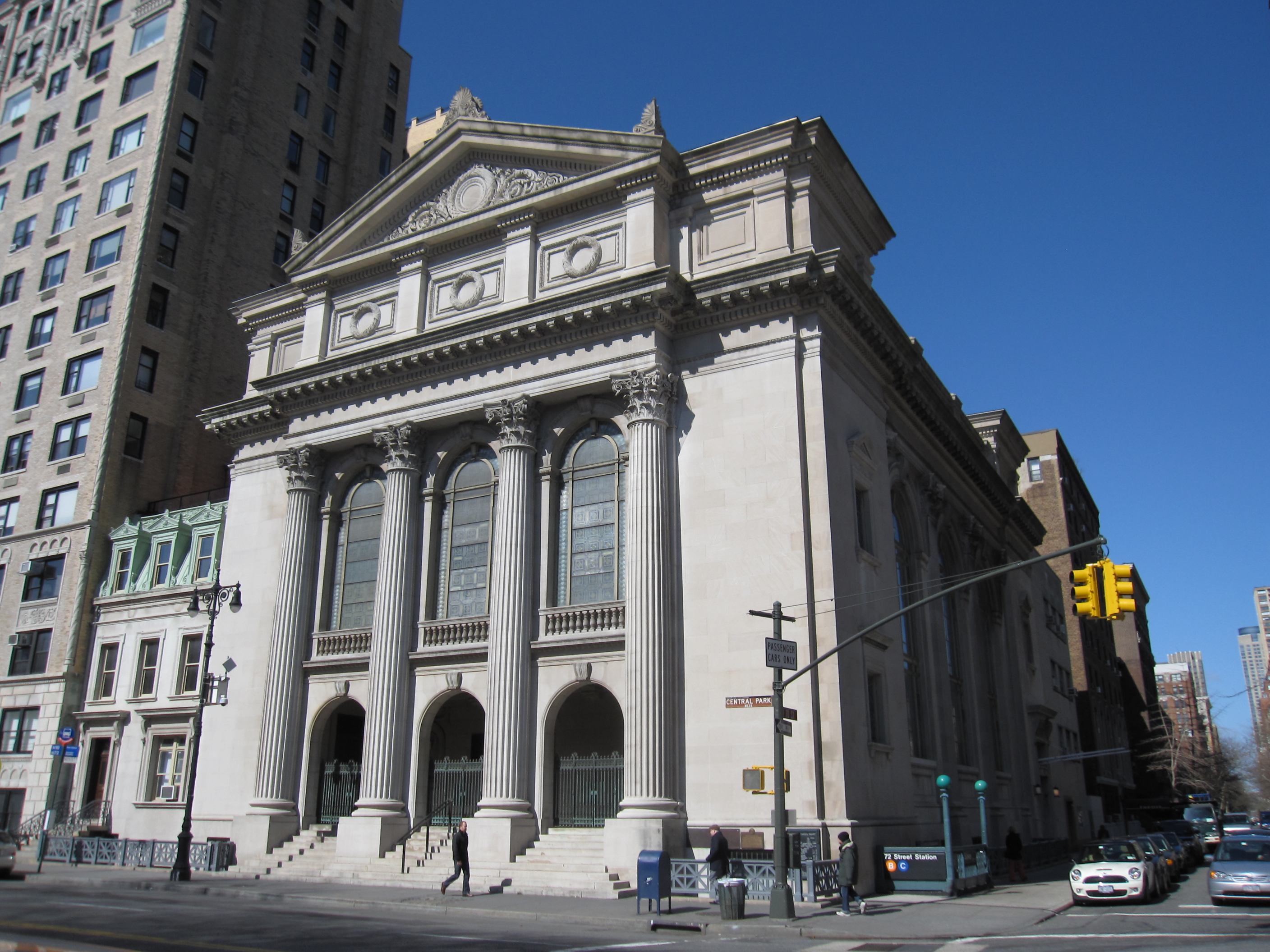
Congregation Shearith Israel

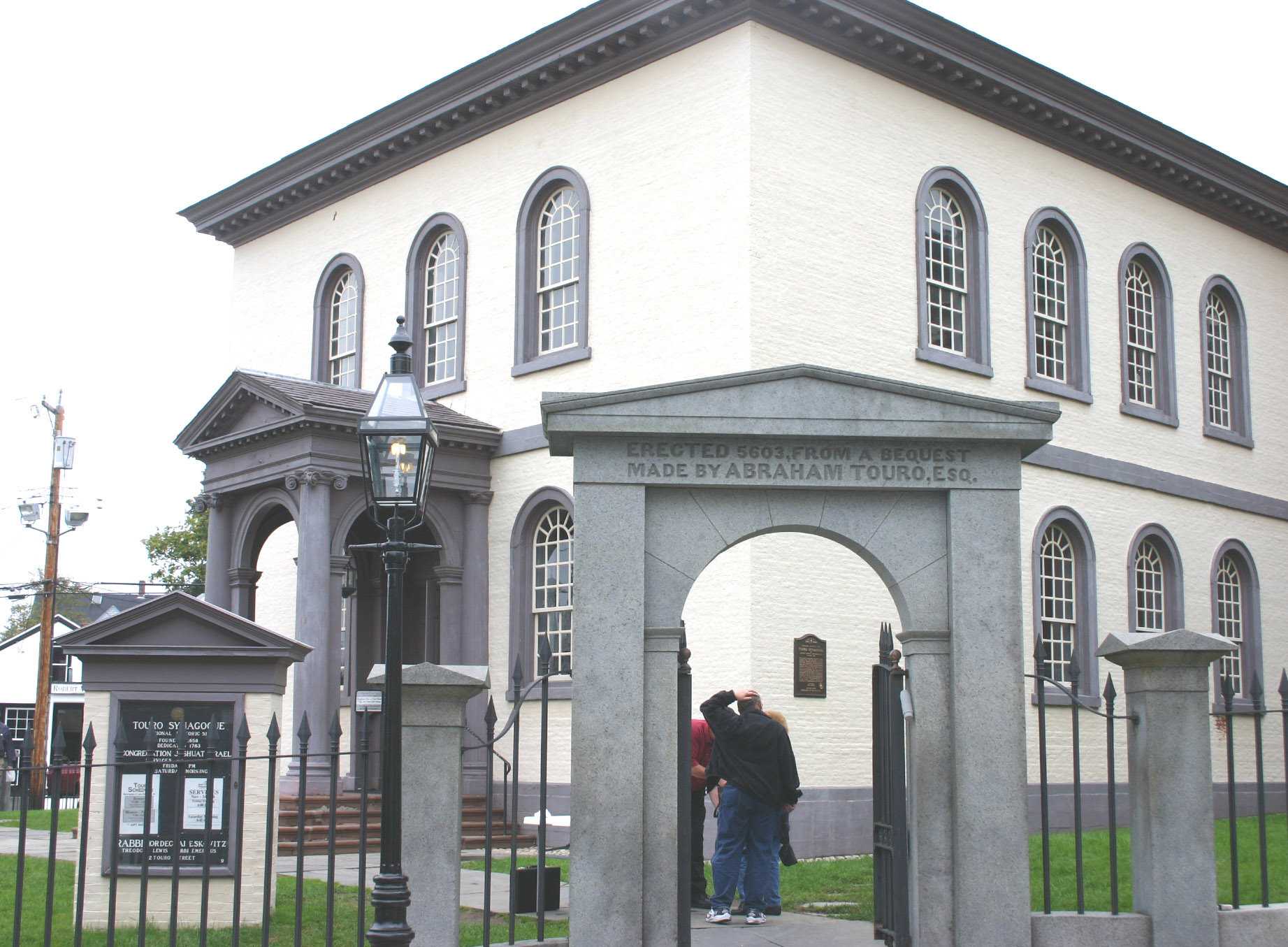
Touro Synagogue

In the British Thirteen Colonies, synagogues were formed before the American Revolution at Newport, Rhode Island and Philadelphia, as well as in cities of the southern colonies of South Carolina, Virginia, and Georgia. Since then, many of the former Sephardic synagogues in the southern states and the Caribbean have become part of the Conservative, Reform or Reconstructionist movements, and retain only a few Spanish and Portuguese traditions. Thus, among the pioneers of the Reform Judaism movement in the 1820s there was the Sephardic congregation Beth Elohim in Charleston, South Carolina.

Despite the Dutch origins of the New York community, by the 19th century all of the Spanish and Portuguese Jewish communities in the United States and Canada were very much part of the London-based family. The 19th and early 20th century editions of the prayer book published in London and Philadelphia contained the same basic text, and were designed for use on both sides of the Atlantic: for example, they all contained both a prayer for the royal family and an alternative for use in republican states. The New York community continued to use these editions until the version of David de Sola Pool was published in 1954. On the other hand, in the first half of the 20th century, the New York community employed a series of hazzanim from Holland, with the result that the community's musical tradition remained close to that of Amsterdam.

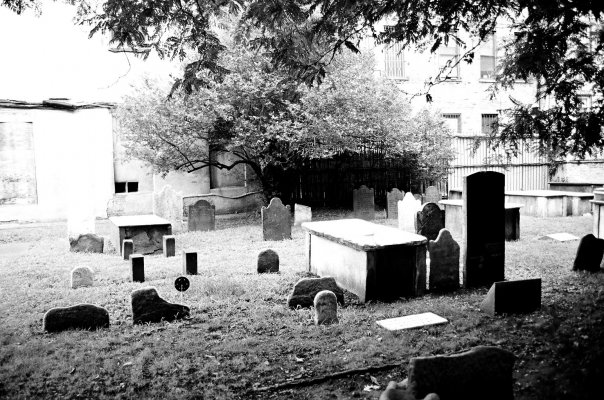
First Cemetery of the Spanish and Portuguese Synagogue, Shearith Israel

There are only two remaining Spanish and Portuguese synagogues in the United States: Shearith Israel in New York, and Mikveh Israel in Philadelphia. In both congregations, only a minority of their membership has Western Sephardic ancestry, with the remaining members a mix of Ashkenazim, Levantine Sephardim, Mizrahim, and converts. Newer Sephardic and Sephardic-rite communities, such as the Syrian Jews of Brooklyn and the Greek and Turkish Jews of Seattle, do not come under the Spanish and Portuguese umbrella. The Seattle community did use the de Sola Pool prayer books until the publication of Siddur Zehut Yosef in 2002. Sephardic Temple Tifereth Israel, a community in Los Angeles with a mainly Turkish ethnic background, still uses the de Sola Pool prayer books.

=== In India and the East Indies – Goa, Cochin, Chennai and Malacca ===
The signing of the Treaty of Tordesillas of 1494, divided the world between Portugal, and Spain. Portugal was allotted responsibility over lands east of the Tordesillas meridian. In 1498 Vasco da Gama arrived on India's western coast where he was first greeted by a Polish Jew: Gaspar da Gama. In 1505 Portugal made Cochin its eastern headquarters, and in 1510 Goa was established as the capital of Portuguese India.

==== Goa ====
With the establishment of the Portuguese colonies in Asia, New Christians began flocking to India's western coast. Regarding Goa, the Jewish Virtual Library states that "From the early decades of the 16th century many New Christians from Portugal came to Goa. The influx soon aroused the opposition of the Portuguese and ecclesiastical authorities, who complained bitterly about the New Christians' influence in economic affairs, their monopolistic practices, and their secret adherence to Judaism." Professor Walter Fischel of the University of California, Berkeley observes that despite the start of the inquisition in Portugal, the Portuguese relied heavily on Jews and New Christians in establishing their fledgling Asian empire. The influence of Jews and New Christians in Goa was substantial. In his book, The Marrano Factory, Professor Antonio Saraiva of the University of Lisbon writes that "King Manuel theoretically abolished discrimination between Old and New Christians by the law of March 1, 1507 which permitted the departure of New Christians to any part of the Christian world, declaring that they 'be considered, favored and treated like the Old Christians and not distinct and separated from them in any matter.' Nevertheless, in apparent contradiction to that law, in a letter dated Almeirim, February 18, 1519, King Manuel promoted legislation henceforth prohibiting the naming of New Christians to the position of judge, town councilor or municipal registrar in Goa, stipulating, however, that those already appointed were not to be dismissed. This shows that even during the first nine years of Portuguese rule, Goa had a considerable influx of recently baptized Spanish and Portuguese Jews" There are even examples of well-positioned Portuguese Jews, and New Christians, leaving the Portuguese administration to work with the Muslim sultanates of India in an attempt to strike back at Portugal for what it had done to them viz-a-viz the inquisition in Portugal. Moises Orfali of Bar-Ilan University writes that the initially Portuguese colonial and ecclesiastical authorities complained in very strong terms about Jewish influence in Goa. The Goa Inquisition which was established in 1560 was initiated by Jesuit Priest Francis Xavier from his headquarters in Malacca due to his inability to reanimate the faith of the New Christians there, Goa and in the region who had returned to Judaism. Goa became the headquarters of the Inquisition in Asia.

==== Cochin, and Chennai ====
Cochin was, and still is, home to an ancient Jewish community (the Cochin Jews). Sephardic Jews from Iberia joined this community and became known as Paradesi Jews or "White Jews" (as opposed to older community which came to be known as the "Malabari Jews" or "Black Jews"). Cochin also attracted New Christians. In his lecture at the Library of Congress, Professor Sanjay Subrahmanyam of University of California, Los Angeles explains that New Christians came to India for economic opportunities (the Spice trade, the Golconda Diamonds trade, etc.) and because India had well-established Jewish communities which allowed them the opportunity to rejoin the Jewish world.

As explained by Professor Fischel, the Sephardic Jews of London were active in trading out of Fort St. George, India which later developed into the city of Madras, and is known today as Chennai and during the early years, the city council was required to have three Jewish aldermen to represent the community's interests.

==== Malacca ====
Malacca, Malaysia was in the 16th century a Jewish hub – not only for Portuguese Jews but also for Jews from the middle east and the Malabar. With its synagogues and rabbis, Jewish culture in Malacca was alive and well. Visible Jewish presence (Dutch Jews) existed in Malacca right up to the 18th century. Due to the inquisition a lot of the Jews of Malacca were either captured or assimilated into the Malacca-Portuguese (Eurasian) community where they continued to live as New Christians. Malacca was the headquarters of Jesuit priest Francis Xavier and it was his discovery of the conversos from Portugal there who had openly returned to Judaism as in the fortresses of India that became the turning point and from whence he wrote to King John III of Portugal to start the inquisition in the East. Prominent Malaccan Jewish figures include Portuguese Rabbi Manoel Pinto, who was persecuted by the Goa Inquisition in 1573 and Duarte Fernandes a former Jewish tailor who had fled Portugal to escape the Inquisition who became the first European to establish diplomatic relations with Thailand.

== Synagogues ==
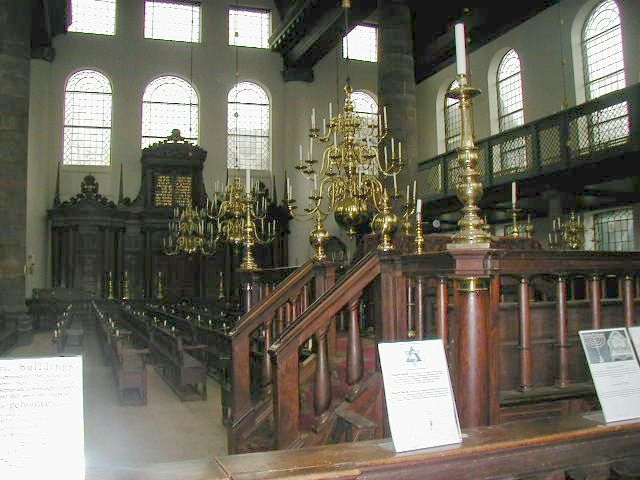
Interior of the Portuguese Synagogue of Amsterdam, with the tebáh (bimah) in the foreground and the Hekhál (Torah ark) in the background.

Most Spanish and Portuguese synagogues are, like those of the Italian and Romaniote Jews, characterised by a bipolar layout, with the tebáh bimah) near the opposite wall to the Hechál (Torah ark). The Hekhál has its parochet (curtain) inside its doors, rather than outside. The sefarim (Torah scrolls) are usually wrapped in a very wide mantle, quite different from the cylindrical mantles used by most Ashkenazi Jews. Tikim, wooden or metal cylinders around the sefarim, are typically not used. These were reportedly used, however, by the Portuguese Jewish community in Hamburg.

The most important synagogues, or esnogas, as they are usually called amongst Spanish and Portuguese Jews, are the Portuguese Synagogue of Amsterdam and those in London and New York. Amsterdam is still the historical centre of the Amsterdam minhag, as used in the Netherlands and former Dutch possessions such as Surinam. Also important is the Bevis Marks Synagogue in London, the historical centre of the London minhag. The Curaçao synagogue (built in 1732 and known as the Snoa, the Papiamento form of esnoga) of the Mikvé Israel-Emanuel congregation is considered one of the most important synagogues in the Jewish history of the Americas.

Since the late 20th century, many esnogas or synagogues in the Iberian Peninsula have been discovered by archaeologists and restored by both private and governmental efforts. In particular, the synagogues of Girona, Spain and Tomar, Portugal have been impressively restored to their former grandeur, if not their former social importance. (See the article Synagogue of Tomar.) Both Spain and Portugal have recently made efforts to reach out to descendants of Jews who were expelled from the peninsula in the 15th century, inviting them to apply for citizenship.

== Language ==
"Spanish and Portuguese Jews" typically spoke both Spanish and Portuguese in their early modern forms. This is in contrast to the languages spoken by Eastern Sephardim and North African Sephardim, which were archaic Old Spanish derived dialects of Judaeo-Spanish ("Ladino") and Haketia (a mixture of Old Spanish, Hebrew, and Aramaic, plus various other languages depending on the area of their settlement). Their Early Modern languages also differ from modern Spanish and Portuguese, as spoken by Sephardic Bnei Anusim of Iberia and Ibero-America, including some recent returnees to Judaism in the late 20th and early 21st centuries.

The use of Spanish and Portuguese languages by Western Sephardim persists in parts of the synagogue service. Otherwise, the use of Spanish and Portuguese quickly diminished amongst the Spanish and Portuguese Jews after the 17th century, when they were adapting to new societies.

In practice, from the mid-19th century on, the Spanish and Portuguese Jews gradually replaced their traditional languages with the local ones of their places of residence for their everyday use. Local languages used by "Spanish and Portuguese Jews" include Dutch in the Netherlands and Belgium, Low German in Altona, English in Great Britain, Ireland, Jamaica, and the United States, and Gascon, in its particular Judeo-Gascon sociolect, in France.

In Curaçao, Spanish and Portuguese Jews contributed to the formation of Papiamento, a creole of Portuguese and various African languages. It is still used as an everyday language on the island.

Spanish and Portuguese Jews who have migrated to Latin America since the late 20th century have generally adopted modern standard Latin American varieties of Spanish as their mother tongue.

=== Portuguese ===
Because of the relatively high proportion of immigrants through Portugal, the majority of Spanish and Portuguese Jews of the 16th and 17th centuries spoke Portuguese as their first language. Portuguese was used for everyday communication in the first few generations, and was the usual language for official documents such as synagogue by-laws; for this reason, synagogue officers still often have Portuguese titles such as Parnas dos Cautivos and Thesoureiro do Heshaim. As a basic academic language, Portuguese was used for such works as the halakhic manual Thesouro dos Dinim by Menasseh Ben Israel and controversial works by Uriel da Costa.

The Judaeo-Portuguese dialect was preserved in some documents, but was extinct since the late 18th century: for example, Portuguese ceased to be a spoken language in Holland in the Napoleonic period, when Jewish schools were allowed to teach only in Dutch and Hebrew. Sermons in Bevis Marks Synagogue were preached in Portuguese till 1830, when English was substituted. Judaeo-Portuguese has had some influence on the Judeo-Italian language of Livorno, known as Bagitto.

=== Castilian (Spanish) ===
Castilian Spanish was used as the everyday language by those who came directly from Spain in the first few generations. Those who came from Portugal regarded it as their literary language, as did the Portuguese at that time. Relatively soon, the Castilian Ladino took on a semi-sacred status ("Ladino", in this context, simply means literal translation from Hebrew: it should not be confused with the Judaeo-Spanish used by Balkan, Greek and Turkish Sephardim.) Works of theology as well as reza books (siddurim) were written in Castilian rather than in Portuguese; while, even in works written in Portuguese such as the Thesouro dos Dinim, quotations from the Bible or the prayer book were usually given in Spanish. Members of the Amsterdam community continued to use Spanish as a literary language. They established clubs and libraries for the study of modern Spanish literature, such as the Academia de los Sitibundos (founded 1676) and the Academia de los Floridos (1685).

In England the use of Spanish continued until the early 19th century: In 1740 Haham Isaac Nieto produced a new translation into contemporary Spanish of the prayers for the New Year and Yom Kippur, and in 1771 a translation of the daily, Sabbath and Festival prayers. There was an unofficial translation into English in 1771 by A. Alexander and others by David Levi in 1789 and following years, but the Prayer Books were first officially translated into English in 1836, by hakham David de Aaron de Sola. Today Spanish Jews in England have little tradition of using Spanish, except for the hymn Bendigamos, the translation of the Biblical passages in the prayer-book for Tisha B'Av, and in certain traditional greetings.

=== Hebrew ===
The Hebrew of the Spanish and Portuguese Jews from the 19th century and 20th century is characterised primarily by the pronunciation of בֿ (Beth rafé) as a hard b (e.g., Abrahám, Tebáh, Habdaláh) and the pronunciation of ע (ʿAyin) as a voiced velar nasal (Shemang, Ngalénu). The hard pronunciation of Beth Rafé differs from the v pronunciation of Moroccan Jews and the Judaeo-Spanish Jews of the Balkans, but is shared by Algerian and Syrian Jews. The nasal pronunciation of 'Ayin is shared with traditional Italian pronunciation (where it can be either "ng" or "ny"), but not with any other Sephardi groups. Both these features are declining, under the influence of hazzanim from other communities and of Israeli Hebrew.

The sibilants ס, שׂ, שׁ and צ are all transcribed as s in earlier sources. This, along with the traditional spellings Sabá (Shabbat), Menasseh (Menashe), Ros(as)anáh (Rosh Hashana), Sedacáh (tzedaka), massoth (matzot), is evidence of a traditional pronunciation which did not distinguish between the various sibilants—a trait which is shared with some coastal dialects of Moroccan Hebrew. Since the 19th century, the pronunciations [ʃ] (for שׁ and [ts] for צ have become common—probably by influence from Oriental Sephardic immigrants, from Ashkenazi Hebrew and, in our times, Israeli Hebrew.

The תֿ (taw rafé) is pronounced like t in all traditions of Spanish and Portuguese Jews today, although the consistent transliteration as th in 17th-century sources may suggest an earlier differentiation of תֿ and תּ. (Final תֿ is occasionally heard as d.)

In Dutch-speaking areas, but not elsewhere, ג (gimel) is often pronounced [χ] like Dutch "g". More careful speakers use this sound for gimel rafé (gimel without dagesh), while pronouncing gimel with dagesh as [ɡ].

Dutch Sephardim take care to pronounce he with mappiq as a full "h", usually repeating the vowel: vi-yamlich malchutéh^{e}.

The accentuation of Hebrew adheres strictly to the rules of Biblical Hebrew, including the secondary stress on syllables with a long vowel before a shva. Also, the shvá nang in the beginning of a word is normally pronounced as a short eh (Shemang, berít, berakháh). Shva nang is also normally pronounced after a long vowel with secondary stress (ngomedím, barekhú). However it is not pronounced after a prefixed u- (and): ubne, not u-bene.

Vocal shva, segol (short e) and tzere (long e) are all pronounced like the 'e' in "bed": there is no distinction except in length. In some communities, e.g. Amsterdam, vocal shva is pronounced [a] when marked with gangya (a straight line next to the vowel symbol, equivalent to meteg), and as [i] when followed by the letter yodh: thus va-nashubah and bi-yom (but be-Yisrael).

The differentiation between kamatz gadol and kamatz katan is made according to purely phonetic rules without regard to etymology, which occasionally leads to spelling pronunciations at variance with the rules laid down in the grammar books. For example, כָל (all), when unhyphenated, is pronounced "kal" rather than "kol" (in "kal ngatsmotai" and "Kal Nidre"), and צָהֳרַיִם (noon) is pronounced "tsahorayim" rather than "tsohorayim". This feature is shared by other Sephardic groups, but is not found in Israeli Hebrew. It is also found in the transliteration of proper names in the King James Version such as Naomi, Aholah and Aholibah.

== Liturgy ==
Although all Sephardic liturgies are similar, each group has its own distinct liturgy. Many of these differences are a product of the syncretization of the Spanish liturgy and the liturgies of the local communities where Spanish exiles settled. Other differences are the result of earlier regional variations in liturgy from pre-expulsion Spain. Moses Gaster (died 1939, Hakham of the S&P Jews of Great Britain) has shown that the order of prayers used by Spanish and Portuguese Jews has its origin in the Castilian liturgy of Pre-Expulsion Spain.

As compared with other Sephardic groups, the minhag of the Spanish and Portuguese Jews is characterised by a relatively low number of cabbalistic additions. The Friday night service thus traditionally starts with Psalm 29, "Mizmor leDavid: Habu LaA.". In the printed siddurim of the mid-17th century, "Lekhah Dodi" and the Mishnaic passage Bammeh madlikin are also not yet included, but these are included in all newer siddurim of the tradition except for the early West London and Mickve Israel (Savannah) Reform prayerbooks, both of which have Spanish and Portuguese roots.

Of other, less conspicuous, elements, a number of archaic forms can be mentioned—including some similarities with the Italian and Western Ashkenazi traditions. Such elements include the shorter form of the Birkat Hamazon which can be found in the older Amsterdam and Hamburg/Scandinavian traditions. The Livorno (Leghorn) tradition, however, includes many of the cabbalistic additions found in most other Sephardi traditions. The current London minhag is generally close to the Amsterdam minhag, but follows the Livorno tradition in some details—most notably in the Birkat Hamazon.

One interesting feature of the tradition (at least in New York and Philadelphia) is that, when reading the haftarah on Simhat Torah and Shabbat Bereshit, the Hatan Torah and Hatan Bereshit chant two extra verses pertaining to bridegrooms from Isaiah 61:10 and 62:5 at the end of the standard haftarot for the days themselves. This seems to be a unique remnant of the old tradition of reading Isaiah 61:10–63:9 if a bridegroom who had been married the previous week was present in synagogue.

== Music ==
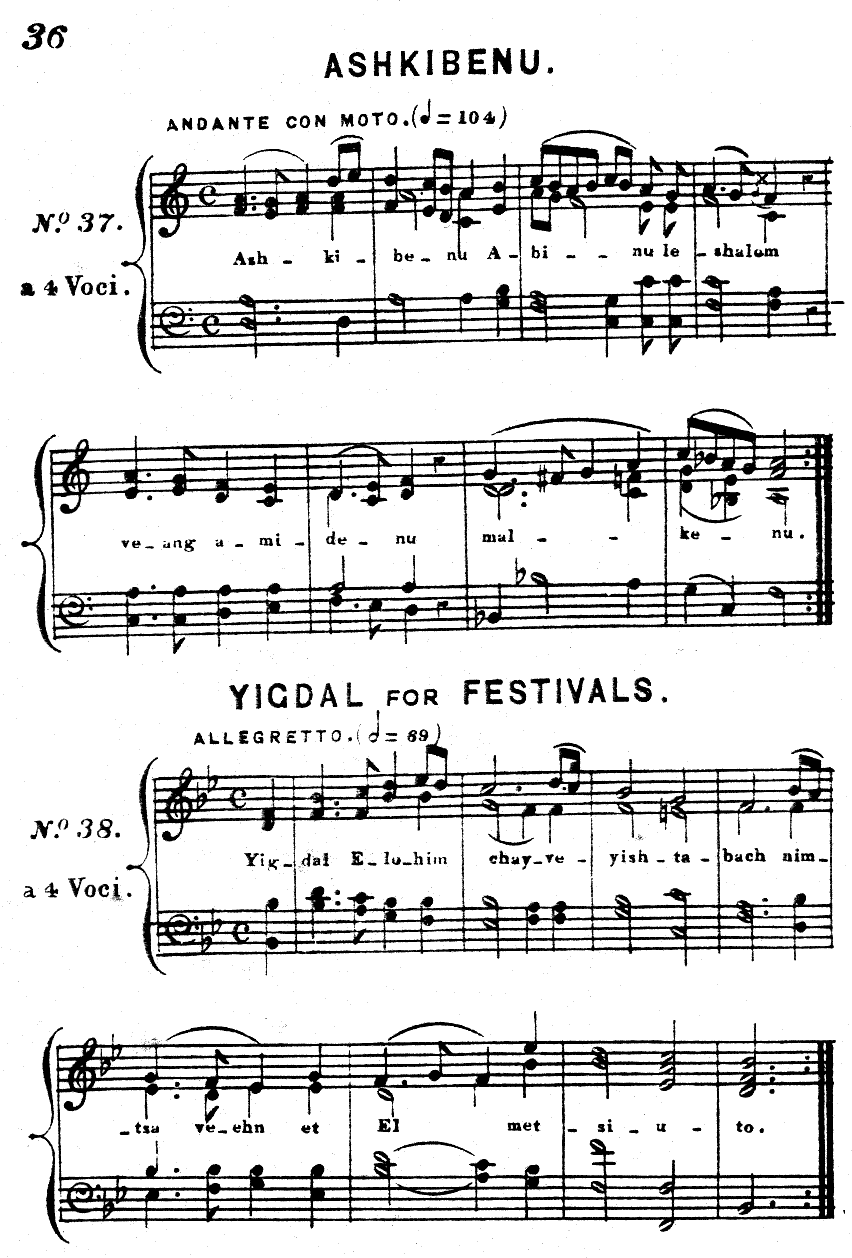
Ashkibenu (Hashkiveinu) and Yigdal from the Spanish and Portuguese Jews' Congregation in London, harmonised by Emanuel Aguilar.

=== Historical ===
The ritual music of the Spanish and Portuguese Jews differs from other Sephardic music in that it is influenced by Western European Baroque and Classical music to a relatively high degree. Not only in Spanish and Portuguese communities, but in many others in southern France and northern Italy, it was common to commission elaborate choral compositions, often including instrumental music, for the dedication of a synagogue, for family events such as weddings and circumcisions and for festivals such as Hoshana Rabbah, on which the halachic restriction on instrumental music did not apply.

Already in 1603, the sources tell us that harpsichords were used in the Spanish and Portuguese synagogues in Hamburg. Particularly in the Amsterdam community, but to some degree also in Hamburg and elsewhere, there was a flourishing of Classical music in the synagogues in the 18th century. There was formerly a custom in Amsterdam, inspired by a hint in the Zohar, of holding an instrumental concert on Friday afternoon prior to the coming in of the Shabbat, as a means of getting the congregants in the right mood for the Friday night service. An important Jewish composer was Abraham Caceres; music was also commissioned from non-Jewish composers such as Cristiano Giuseppe Lidarti, some of which is still used such has this aria from Lidarti's Oratorio Esther or this inaugural piece "Col Ansama" recorded live in Amsterdam's Royal Concertgebouw.

The same process took place in Italy, where the Venetian community commissioned music from non-Jewish composers such as Carlo Grossi and Benedetto Marcello.

Another important centre for Spanish and Portuguese Jewish music was Livorno, where a rich cantorial tradition developed, incorporating both traditional Sephardic music from around the Mediterranean and composed art music: this was in turn disseminated to other centres.

In the eighteenth and nineteenth centuries, in particular in Italy at the time of the Italian unification, hazzanim sometimes doubled as opera singers, and some liturgical compositions from this period reflect this operatic character.

==== Choirs ====
Already in the 17th century, choirs were used in the service throughout the year in the Amsterdam community. In 1886 the Portuguese vocal society Santo Serviço was established. In 2005 this choir was re-established under the leadership of musical director Barry Mehler. Their debut was broadcast on national television (NOS). This custom was introduced in London in the early 19th century. In most cases, the choirs have consisted only of men and boys, but in Curaçao, the policy was changed to allow women in the choir (in a separate section) in 1863.

==== Instrumental music ====
There are early precedents for the use of instrumental music in the synagogue originating in 17th century Italy as well as the Spanish and Portuguese communities of Hamburg and Amsterdam and in the Ashkenazic community of Prague. As in most other communities the use of instrumental music is not permitted on Shabbat or festivals.

As a general rule, Spanish and Portuguese communities do not use pipe organs or other musical instruments during services. In some Spanish and Portuguese communities, notably in France (Bordeaux, Bayonne), US (Savannah, Georgia, Charleston, South Carolina, Richmond, Virginia) and the Caribbean (Curaçao), pipe organs came into use during the course of the 19th century, in parallel with developments in Reform Judaism. In Curaçao, where the traditional congregation had an organ set up in the late 19th century, the use of the organ on Shabbat was eventually also accepted, as long as the organ player was not Jewish. In the more traditional congregations, such as London and New York, a free-standing organ or electric piano is used at weddings or benot mitzvah (although never on Shabbat or Yom Tob), in the same way as in some English Ashkenazi synagogues.

=== Current practice ===
The cantorial style of the Spanish and Portuguese Jews adheres to the general Sephardi principle that every word is sung out loud and that most of the ritual is performed communally rather than soloistically (although nowadays in the New York community, the Pesukei dezimra (zemirot) throughout the year, Hallel on festivals or the new moon, and several of the selichot during Yom Kippur are chanted in a manner more similar to the Ashkenazi practice of reading only the first and last few verses of each paragraph aloud). The hazzan's role is typically one of guiding the congregation rather than being a soloist. Thus, there is traditionally a much stronger emphasis on correct diction and knowledge of the musical minhag than on the soloistic voice quality. In the parts of the service where the ḥazzan would traditionally have a more soloistic role, the basic melodies are embellished according to the general principles of Baroque performance practice: for example, after a prayer or hymn sung by the congregation, the ḥazzan often repeats the last line in a highly elaborated form. Two- and three-part harmony is relatively common, and Edwin Seroussi has shown that the harmonies are a reflection of more complex, four-part harmonies in written sources from the 18th century.

The recitative style of the central parts of the service, such as the Amidah, the Psalms and the cantillation of the Torah is loosely related to that of other Sephardi and Mizraḥi communities, though there is no formal maqam system as used by most of these. The closest resemblance is to the rituals of Gibraltar and Northern Morocco, as Spanish and Portuguese communities traditionally recruited their ḥazzanim from these countries. There is a remoter affinity with the Babylonian and North African traditions: these are more conservative than the Syrian and Judaeo-Spanish (Balkan, Greek, Turkish) traditions, which have been more heavily influenced by popular Mediterranean, Turkish and Arabic music.

In other parts of the service, and in particular on special occasions such as the festivals, Shabbat Bereshit and the anniversary of the founding of the synagogue, the traditional tunes are often replaced by metrical and harmonized compositions in the Western European style. This is not the case on Rosh Hashanah and Kippúr (Yom Kippur), when the whole service has a far more archaic character.

A characteristic feature of Oriental Sephardic music is the transposition of popular hymn tunes (themselves sometimes derived from secular songs) to important prayers such as Nishmat and Kaddish. This occurs only to a limited extent in the Spanish and Portuguese ritual: such instances as exist can be traced to the book of hymns Imre no'am (1628), published in Amsterdam by Joseph Gallego, a hazzan originating in Salonica. Certain well-known tunes, such as El nora aliláh and Ahhot ketannáh, are shared with Sephardi communities worldwide with small variations.

=== Cantillation ===
Spanish and Portuguese traditional cantillation has several unique elements. Torah cantillation is divided into two musical styles. The first is the standard used for all regular readings. A similar but much more elaborate manner of cantillation is used on special occasions. This is normally referred to as High Tangamim or High Na'um. It is used for special portions of the Torah reading, principally the Ten Commandments but also Chapter 1 of Bereshit (on Simchat Torah), the Shirat ha-Yam, the Song of Moses, the concluding sentences of each of the five books and several other smaller portions.

Spanish and Portuguese Torah cantillation has been notated several times since the 17th century. The melodies now in use, particularly in London, show some changes from the earlier notated versions and a degree of convergence with the Iraqi melody.

The rendition of the Haftarah (prophetic portion) also has two (or three) styles. The standard, used for most haftarot, is nearly identical with that of the Moroccan nusach. A distinctly more somber melody is used for the three haftarot preceding the ninth of Ab (the "three weeks".) On the morning of the Ninth of Ab a third melody is used for the Haftarah—although this melody is borrowed from the melody for the Book of Ruth.

There is a special melody used for reading the Book of Esther on Purim, but this is not cantillation in the accepted sense as it is chant-like and does not depend on the Masoretic symbols. There are however the remnants of a cantillation melody in the chant for the verses from the Book of Esther read at the conclusion of the morning service in the two weeks preceding Purim; this melody is also used for certain verses recited by the congregation during the reading on Purim itself.

The books of Ruth, read on Shavuot, and Lamentations, read on the Ninth of Ab, have their own cantillation melodies as well. There is no tradition of reading Ecclesiastes.

Most Spanish and Portuguese communities have no tradition of liturgical reading of the Shir haShirim (Song of Songs), unlike Ashkenazim who read it on Pesach and Oriental Sephardim who read it on Friday nights. However, in the two weeks preceding Pesach a passage consisting of selected verses from that book is read each day at the end of the morning service. The chant is similar but not identical to the chant for Shir haShirim in the Moroccan tradition, but does not exactly follow the printed cantillation marks. A similar chant is used for the prose parts of the book of Job on the Ninth of Ab.

There is no cantillation mode for the books of Psalms, Proverbs and the poetic parts of Job. The chant for the Psalms in the Friday night service has some resemblance to the cantillation mode of the Oriental traditions, but is not in any obvious way dependent on the cantillation marks.

== Communities, past and present ==
City	Synagogue or Community	Website	Comments

=== Europe ===
==== Belgium and the Netherlands ====
Amsterdam	Congregation Talmud Torah, Visserplein (1639)	https://www.esnoga.com/en/	synagogue opened 1675
Antwerp	Portuguese synagogue, Hovenierstraat (1898)		synagogue opened 1913; membership and ritual now mainly North African
The Hague		http://www.ljgdenhaag.nl/	now the Liberal Synagogue

==== France ====
Bayonne		http://www.communautedebayonne.org/	see French Wikipedia article
Bordeaux	Great Synagogue of Bordeaux	http://www.synagogue-bordeaux.com/,	
Paris	Temple Buffault (1877)		membership mainly Algerian
Carpentras			formerly used the Provençal rite, then assimilated to the Bordeaux Portuguese minhag

==== Germany and Denmark ====
Hamburg	Beth Israel (1652)	
Altona	Neweh Schalom (c. 1700–1885)	
Glückstadt		
Copenhagen	the Portuguese congregation of Copenhagen (1684)	
Fredericia		community active between 1675 and 1902

==== Gibraltar ====
Gibraltar	Sha'ar Hashamayim (1724)	known as "Esnoga Grande". Opened 1812
	Ets Hayim (1759)	known as "Esnoga Chica"
	Nefutsot Yehuda (1799)	known as "Esnoga Flamenca"
	Abudarham Synagogue (1820)	named after Solomon Abudarham

==== Great Britain ====
London (City of London)	Bevis Marks Synagogue (synagogue opened 1701)	https://www.sephardi.org.uk/ (whole community); http://www.bevismarks.org.uk (Bevis Marks)	community Sahar Asamaim dates from 1656, owns all three synagogues
London (City of Westminster)	Wigmore Street branch synagogue (1853–1861)	http://www.jewishgen.org/jcr-uk/london/bryanston_seph/index.htm	
London (City of Westminster)	Bryanston Street branch synagogue (1866–1896)	http://www.jewishgen.org/jcr-uk/london/bryanston_seph/index.htm (wrongly shown as "Bryanston Road")	replaced Wigmore Street synagogue
London (City of Westminster)	Lauderdale Road synagogue (1896)	http://www.lauderdaleroadsynagogue.org	replaced Bryanston Street branch synagogue
	Wembley Synagogue (1977)	http://www.wsps.org.uk/	community formed in 1962
London (Kensington & Chelsea)	Holland Park Synagogue	http://www.hollandparksynagogue.com	mixed rite, Greek and Turkish
	Rambam Sephardi Synagogue, Elstree	http://www.rambam.org.uk/	in process of formation
	Andrade Synagogue (1865–1884)	http://www.jewishgen.org/jcr-uk/london/islington_andrade/index.htm	private synagogue in Islington
	Mildmay Park Synagogue (1885–1935)	http://www.jewishgen.org/jcr-uk/london/mildmay_seph/index.htm	private synagogue in Highbury
Manchester	Sha'are Hayim (formerly Withington Congregation of Spanish and Portuguese Jews), Queenston Road, West Didsbury (community formed 1906 or before; synagogue opened 1926)		
	Sha'are Sedek, Old Lansdowne Road, West Didsbury (1924)	http://www.jewishgen.org/jcr-uk/Community/m35_seph-sth-man/index.htm	formerly independent; later merged into Sephardi Congregation of South Manchester
Hale	Sha'are Sedek	https://www.shalommorris.com/2016/06/29/south-manchester-shaare-rahamim-and-zedek/	in formation
Salford	Spanish and Portuguese Synagogue (Sha'are Tephillah)	https://www.moorlane.info	formerly at Cheetham Hill (the old building is now the Manchester Jewish Museum)
Leeds	Spanish and Portuguese Synagogue of Leeds (est. 1924; dissolved in late 1940s)		

==== Ireland ====
Dublin	Crane Lane Synagogue; Dublin's Old Hebrew Congregation (1660–1791)	Also known as Crane Lane Synagogue, Marlborough Green Synagogue.
Cork	Portuguese congregation	Founded either 1731 or 1747, extinct by 1796

==== Italy ====
Venice	Scola Spagnola (1550)	http://jvenice.org/en/spanish-synagogue	
Pisa	Synagogue of Pisa (1591–3)	http://pisaebraica.it/cms/	original synagogue built 1595; rebuilt c. 1860
Livorno	Comunità ebraica di Livorno (1593)	http://www.comunitaebraica.org/main_eng.htm	original synagogue built 1603; present synagogue opened 1962
Florence	Great Synagogue of Florence	http://moked.it/firenzebraica	
Rome	Tempio Spagnolo, Via Catalana		uses one room of the Great Synagogue of Rome

==== Portugal ====
Lisbon	Sha'aré Tikvá	http://www.cilisboa.org/	
	Ohel Jacob	https://hehaver-oheljacob.org/	
Oporto	Sinagoga Mekor Haim (Kadoorie Synagogue)	http://comunidade-israelita-porto.org/	
Belmonte	Bet Eliahu		see History of the Jews in Belmonte
Ponta Delgada, Azores	Sahar Hassamaim Synagogue		see Portuguese Wikipedia article
Angra do Heroísmo, Terceira, Azores	Sinagoga Ets Haim		see Portuguese Wikipedia article
Funchal, Madeira	Synagogue of Funchal		Currently disused

=== Asia ===
==== Israel ====
Jerusalem	Congregation Shaare Ratzon (1981)	http://www.sandpjerusalem.org/	located in the Istanbuli Synagogue in Jerusalem's Old City and following (mostly) the London minhag with occasional guest hazzanim

==== India ====
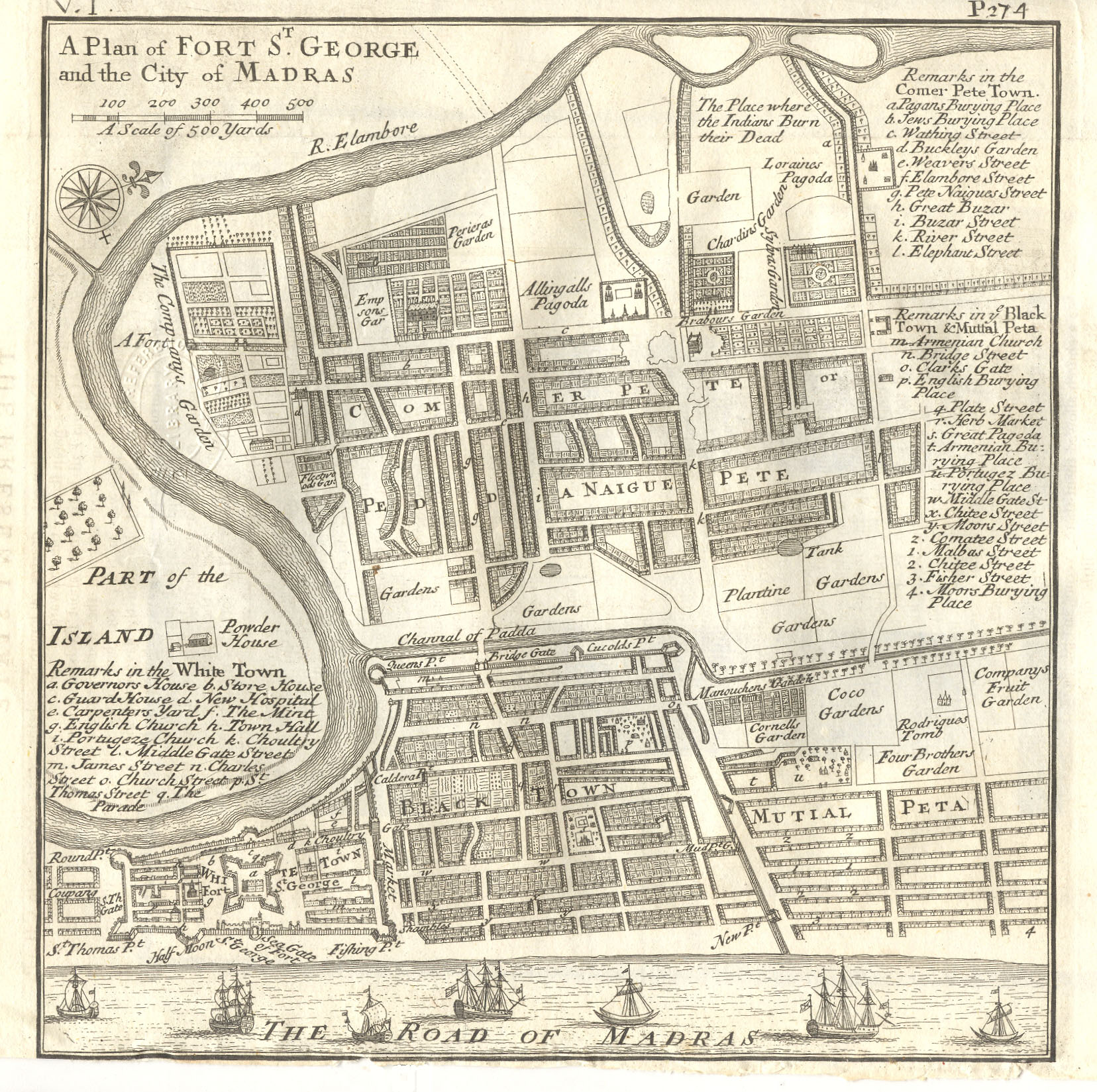
Plan of Fort St George and the city of Madras in 1726, Shows b.Jews Burying Place Jewish Cemetery Chennai, Four Brothers Garden and Bartolomeo Rodrigues Tomb

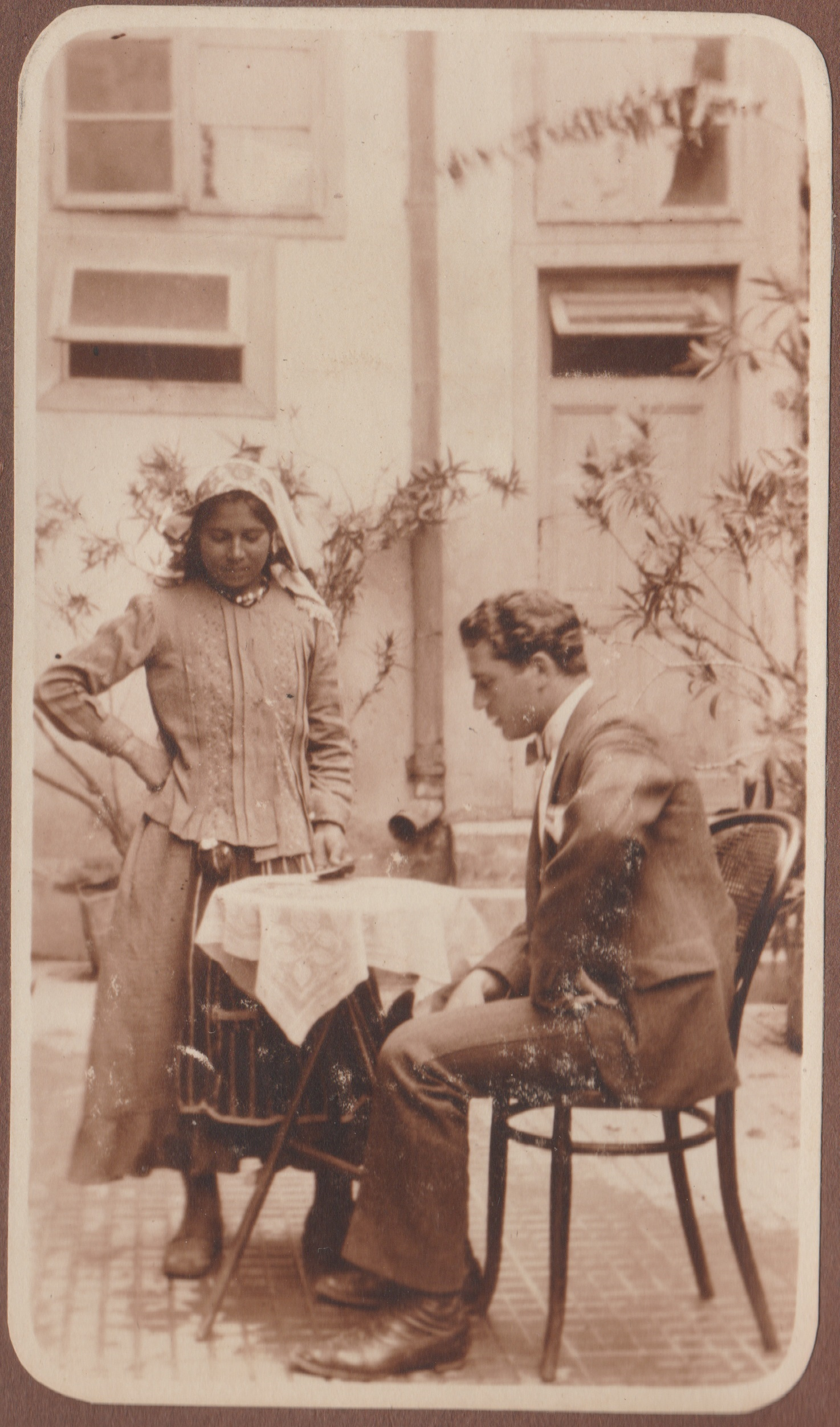
Rabbi Salomon Halevi (Last Rabbi of Madras Synagogue) and his wife Rebecca Cohen, Paradesi Jews of Madras

Chennai	Madras Synagogue	dwindling mixed Portuguese, Spanish and Dutch Sephardic community known as Paradesi Jews. Madras Synagogue was demolished by the local government to make space for the construction of a municipal school. Jewish Cemetery Chennai remains the only memoir of the once significant Jewish population of Chennai

==== Indonesia ====
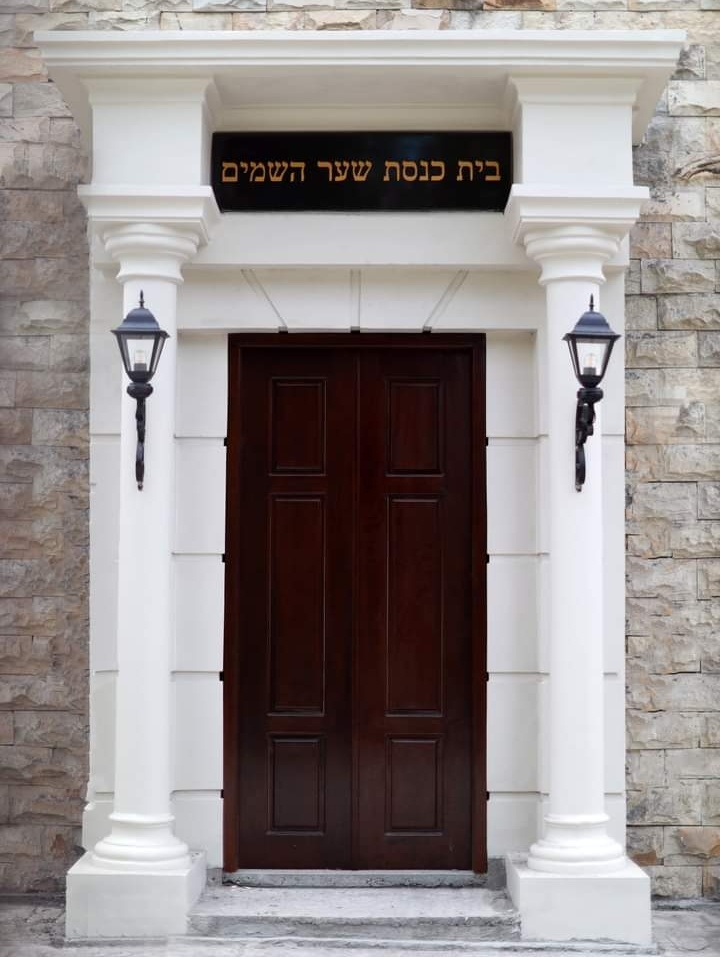
The gate of Shaar Hashamayim Synagogue

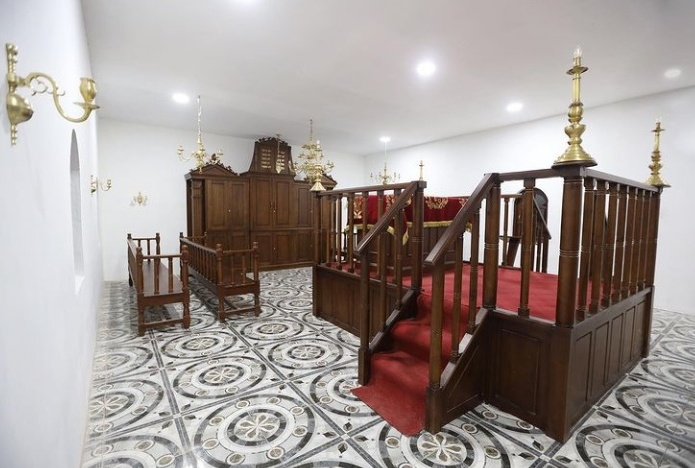
Inside the building

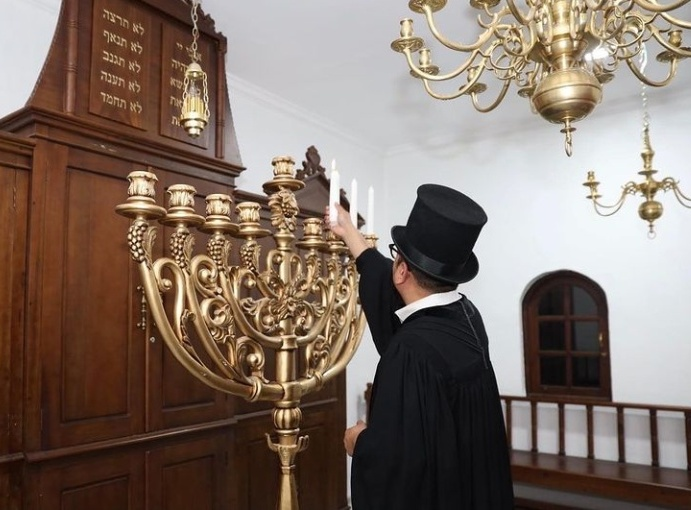
Rabbi Yaakov Baruch (The leader of congregation Shaar Hashamayim) lights the Menorah

Surabaya	Surabaya Synagogue	dwindling mixed Dutch Sephardic, Baghdadi, and Yemenite community. Closed down in 2009 because of political upheavals
Tondano	Beth Knesset Shaar Hashamayim	founded in 2004 by Dutch Sephardim. The only synagogue in Indonesia that is still in operation

=== Americas ===
==== Canada ====
Montreal	Spanish and Portuguese Synagogue of Montreal (1768)	http://www.thespanish.org/	current synagogue opened 1947

==== United States ====
New York City	Congregation Shearith Israel (1654)	http://www.shearithisrael.org/	first synagogue built 1730; current building dates from 1897
Newport, Rhode Island	Touro Synagogue "Congregation Jeshuat Israel" (1658)	http://www.tourosynagogue.org	synagogue opened 1763; reopened 1883. Current rite is Nusach Sefard, not Spanish-Portuguese
Philadelphia	Mikveh Israel (1745)	http://www.mikvehisrael.org/	congregation founded in 1740; current building dates to 1976
Houston, Texas	Qahal Qadosh Ess Hayim (2005)		Defunct.
Miami, Florida	Comunidad Nidhé Israel, judios Hispano-portugueses de Florida (2007)		Defunct.
Richmond, Virginia	Beth Shalome (1789–1898)	http://www.bethahabah.org/index.htm	since merged into congregation Beth Ahabah, which is now Reform
Charleston, South Carolina	Congregation Beth Elohim (1750)	http://www.kkbe.org/	now Reform
Savannah, Georgia	Congregation Mickve Israel (1733)	http://www.mickveisrael.org/	now Reform
New Orleans	Nefutzot Yehudah	http://www.tourosynagogue.com/	since merged into Touro Synagogue (New Orleans) (1828), now Reform

==== Central America and the Caribbean ====
Willemstad, Curaçao	Mikve Israel-Emanuel (1730)	http://www.snoa.com	now Reconstructionist
Jamaica	Neveh Shalom (1704)	http://www.ucija.org, http://www.haruth.com/JewsJamaica	merged into the United Congregation of Israelites (1921)
Aruba	Beth Israel	http://www.haruth.com/JewsAruba.html	
St. Thomas, Virgin Islands	Beracha Veshalom Vegmiluth Hasidim, Charlotte Amalie (1796)	https://web.archive.org/web/20080726043634/http://www.onepaper.com/synagogue/	now Reform
Barbados	Nidhe Israel Synagogue, Bridgetown (1651)	http://www.haruth.com/jw/JewsBarbados.html	now Conservative
El Salvador	Sephardic Orthodox Jewish Council of El Salvador "Shearit Israel" (2008)	http://www.sephardicjews.org, http://www.kosherelsalvador.com	the only orthodox synagogue in El Salvador
Dominican Republic	Beth HaMidrash Eleazar "Casa de Estudio Sefardíes de la Republica Dominicana" (2009)	http://www.bmeleazar.org	the only traditional Sephardic Center in the Dominican Republic
Trinidad and Tobago	B'nai Shalom (2001)	http://www.jewishtnt.org	the Jewish society of Trinidad and Tobago, which uses Sephardi minhag; many members are of Sephardic origin
Panama	Kol Shearith Israel (1876)		

==== Suriname ====
Paramaribo	Sedek Ve Shalom Synagogue (1735)		community merged with Neveh Shalom; Conservative
	Neveh Shalom Synagogue (1716 to 1735)	http://www.suriname-jewish-community.com/index.html	sold to Ashkenazim in 1735
Jodensavanne	Congregation Bereche ve Shalom (1639 to 1832)		

==== Brazil ====
Recife	Kahal Zur Israel Synagogue (1637 to 1654)	recently restored as museum and community centre

== Prominent rabbis/clergy ==
- Immanuel Aboab
- Menasseh Ben Israel
- Jacob ben Aaron Sasportas
- Saul Levi Morteira
- Jacob ben Hayyim Zemah
- Isaac Aboab da Fonseca
- Jacob Abendana
- David Nieto
- Hezekiah da Silva
- Isaac Nieto
- Gershom Mendes Seixas
- Raphael Meldola
- David de Aaron de Sola
- Elijah Benamozegh
- Abraham de Sola
- Sabato Morais
- Abraham Pereira Mendes
- Frederick de Sola Mendes
- Joseph Athias
- Henry Pereira Mendes
- Moses Gaster
- David de Sola Pool
- Shem Tob Gaguine
- Judah Cassuto
- Aron Mendes Chumaceiro
- Abraham Lopes Cardozo
- Isaac Touro
- Henry Samuel Morais
- Abraham Cohen Pimentel
- Emanuel Nunes Carvalho
- Jessurun Cardozo
- Solomon Gaon
- David Cohen de Lara
- Marc D. Angel
- Hayyim Angel
- Pinchas Toledano
- Joseph Dweck

== Other prominent personalities ==
- First-generation Sephardic exiles – Isaac Abravanel, Solomon ibn Verga, Abraham Zacuto, de:Abraham ben Salomon de Torrutiel Ardutiel, Joseph ben Tzaddik
- Judah Leon Abravanel – physician, poet, and philosopher
- Pedro de Herrera – Gibraltar community leader
- Alonso Calle – treasurer on the first voyage of Christopher Columbus to the Americas; one of the settlers of Sephardic origin who composed the crew
- Juan de Vergara – writer, humanist and hellenist
- Garcia de Orta – physician, herbalist and naturalist
- Gracia Mendes Nasi – businesswoman and philanthropist
- Amato Lusitano – physician who discovered the circulation of the blood
- Joseph Nasi – Duke of Naxos
- Roderigo Lopez – physician who served Elizabeth I of England
- Abraham Usque – 16th-century publisher
- Samuel Pallache – merchant, diplomat and pirat
- Elijah Montalto – physician and polemicist from Paris, became the personal physician of Marie de' Medici
- Abraham Cohen Herrera – religious philosopher and Kabbalist
- Uriel da Costa – controversial writer
- Antonio Fernandez Carvajal – Portuguese-Jewish merchant, became the first endenizened English Jew
- Moses Cohen Henriques – Caribbean pirate
- Jacob Lumbrozo – physician, farmer, and trader resident in the Province of Maryland
- Isaac Cardoso – physician, philosopher, and polemic writer
- Benjamin Musaphia – Jewish doctor, scholar and Kabbalist
- Leonora Duarte – Flemish composer and musician
- David Cohen Nassy – professional colonizer who started Jewish colonies in the Caribbean
- Isaac Orobio de Castro – religious writer
- Isaac de Castro Tartas – Jewish martyr
- Miguel de Barrios – poet and historian
- David de Castro Tartas – printer in Amsterdam
- Gabriel Milan – governor of the Danish West Indies
- Abraham Israel Pereyra – prominent Portuguese-Dutch merchant
- Solomon Franco – Jewish rabbi, converted to Anglicanism, first Jew in Greater Boston
- Baruch Spinoza – philosopher
- Daniel Israel López Laguna – Portuguese-Jamaican translator and poet
- Joseph de la Vega – merchant, poet, and philanthropist
- Solomon de Medina – army contractor for William III of England, first Jew to be knighted in England
- Moses da Costa – 18th-century English banker
- Isaac de Sequeira Samuda – British physician
- Francisco Lopes Suasso – financier to William the Silent
- Luis Moises Gomez – prominent businessman and leader within the early Jewish community in the Province of New York
- Joseph Franco Serrano – Amsterdam publisher, academician and translator of the Torah into Spanish
- Samuel Nunez – Portuguese physician, among the earliest Jews to settle in North America
- Jacob de Castro Sarmento – Portuguese estrangeirado, physician, naturalist, poet and deist
- Baron Diego Pereira d'Aguilar – Austrian-English Jewish businessman, community leader and philanthropist
- António José da Silva – Brazilian dramatist
- John de Sequeyra – British physician who was born into a Spanish-Portuguese Jewish family
- David Franco Mendes – Dutch Hebrew-language poet
- Jacob Rodrigues Pereira – financier, academic and the first teacher of deaf-mutes in France
- Joseph Salvador – British-Jewish businessman, first and only Jew to become a director of the East India Company
- Isaac de Pinto – Dutch scholar and one of the main investors in the Dutch East India Company
- Emanuel Mendes da Costa – English botanist, naturalist, philosopher, and collector of valuable notes and of manuscripts, and of anecdotes of the literati
- Abraham de Caceres – Portuguese-Dutch composer of the late baroque period
- Isaac Pinto – American publisher
- Aaron Lopez – Portuguese Jewish merchant and philanthropist
- Isaac Henrique Sequeira – Portuguese Jewish doctor
- Ephraim Lópes Pereira d'Aguilar, 2nd Baron d'Aguilar – second Baron d'Aguilar, a Barony of the Holy Roman Empire
- Haym Salomon – financier to George Washington
- Francis Salvador – first American Jew killed in the American Revolution
- Aaron Nunez Cardozo —English businessman, established in Gibraltar and was consul for Tunis and Algiers in Gibraltar
- Daniel Mendoza – English prizefighter, boxing champion of England (1792–95)
- Isaac D'Israeli – writer
- David Ricardo – economist
- Judah Touro – American businessman and philanthropist
- Moses Montefiore – philanthropist
- Mordecai Manuel Noah – American playwright, diplomat, journalist, and utopian
- Henri Castro – one of the most important empresarios of the Republic of Texas
- Olinde Rodrigues – French banker, mathematician, and social reformer
- Isaac Mendes Belisario – Jamaican artist
- Abraham Capadose – Dutch physician
- Rehuel Lobatto – Dutch mathematician
- Isaac da Costa – Dutch poet
- Péreire brothers – French financiers, rivals of the Rothschilds
- Abraham Cohen Labatt – American merchant and pioneer of Reform Judaism in the United States
- Benjamin Mendes da Costa – English merchant and philanthropist
- David Laurent de Lara – London-based, Dutch-born limner
- Jacob De Cordova – founder of the Gleaner Company and later a member of the Texas House of Representatives
- Judah P. Benjamin – politician and lawyer
- Samuel Sarphati – Dutch physician and Amsterdam city planner
- Joseph d'Aguilar Samuda – English civil engineer and politician
- Grace Aguilar – novelist
- Mark Prager Lindo – Dutch prose writer
- Edwin de Leon —diplomat, writer, and journalist in the Confederate States of America
- Moses Angel – educationist and founder of The Jewish Chronicle
- Samuel Senior Coronel – Dutch physician
- Albert Cardozo – American jurist
- Camille Pissarro – French painter
- Jacob Mendes Da Costa – American physician and surgeon
- Jacob da Silva Solis-Cohen - American physician who specialized in the field of laryngology.
- Thomas Cooper de Leon – American journalist, author, and playwright
- Catulle Mendès – French poet
- Moses Jacob Ezekiel – American soldier and sculptor
- Emma Lazarus – American poet
- Raphael Meldola – British chemist and entomologist
- Ernest Peixotto – artist
- Daniel De Leon – American socialist, editor-in-chief of a newspaper, politician, Marxist theoretician, and trade union organizer
- David Belasco – American theatrical producer, impresario, director and playwright
- M.A. Mendes de Leon – Dutch physician, one of the founding fathers of gynaecology in the Netherlands
- Solomon da Silva Solis-Cohen - American physician, professor of medicine and prominent Zionist.
- Rufus Isaacs, 1st Marquess of Reading – Viceroy of India (1921–25), barrister, jurist and Secretary of State for Foreign and Commonwealth Affairs of the United Kingdom
- David Lobo – Venezuelan doctor, professor, writer and politician.
- Annie Nathan Meyer – American author and promoter of higher education for women
- Maud Nathan – American social worker, labor activist and suffragette for women's right to vote
- Joseph Mendes da Costa – Dutch sculptor and teacher.
- Samuel Jessurun de Mesquita – Dutch graphic artist, teacher of M. C. Escher
- Benjamin N. Cardozo – U.S. Supreme Court Justice
- Theodore Seixas Solomons –explorer and early member of the Sierra Club
- Federigo Enriques – Italian mathematician
- Emanuel Querido – successful Dutch publisher
- Elías David Curiel – Venezuelan poet, educator and journalist
- Reine Colaço Osorio-Swaab – Dutch composer
- Mozes Salomon Vaz Dias – Dutch newspaperman
- Ernesto Cortissoz Alvarez-Correa – Colombian commercial aviation pioneer, founder of SCADTA (now known as Avianca), the oldest still-operating airline in the Americas
- David Jessurun Lobo – Dutch theater actor
- Alexander Teixeira de Mattos – Dutch journalist, literary critic and publisher, who gained his greatest fame as a translator
- Carlos Salzedo French harpist, pianist, composer and conductor
- Max Oróbio de Castro – Dutch cellist
- Philip Guedalla – writer and critic
- Joseph Teixeira de Mattos – Dutch watercolor painter and pastellist
- Robert Nathan – American novelist and poet
- Vivian de Sola Pinto – British poet, literary critic and historian
- Morris Fidanque de Castro – first native Governor of the United States Virgin Islands
- Robert David Quixano Henriques – British writer, broadcaster and farmer
- Sir Alan Mocatta – English judge, expert on restrictive practices and a leader of the Spanish and Portuguese Jews of Britain
- Pierre Mendès France – French President of the Council of Ministers
- William Pereira – American architect noted for his futuristic designs of landmark buildings
- Sam Costa – British popular singer and radio disk jockey
- Max Delvalle – Vice President (and briefly President) of Panama
- Frank de Miranda – Dutch sculptor, psychologist and publicist.
- Frank R. Nunes Nabarro – English-born South African physicist and one of the pioneers of solid-state physics
- George Maduro – Dutch war hero
- Abraham Bueno de Mesquita – comedian
- Abraham Pais – Dutch-born American physicist and science historian
- Hans Ulrich Jessurun d'Oliveira – Dutch journalist and writer
- Eric Arturo Delvalle – President of Panama
- Bruce Bueno de Mesquita – political scientist, professor at New York University, and senior fellow at Stanford University's Hoover Institution
- René Cassin, French jurist

== Descendants of Spanish and Portuguese Jews ==
- Luis de Carvajal y de la Cueva – adventurer, slaver and first governor and captain-general of the New Kingdom of León
- Michel de Montaigne – French writer
- Diego Velázquez – Spanish painter
- Juan Lindo – First president of El Salvador and president of Honduras
- Christian de Meza – commander of the Danish army during the 1864 Second Schleswig War
- Camille Pissarro – Danish-French Impressionist and Neo-impressionist painter
- Jorge Isaacs – Colombian writer, politician and soldier
- Francisco Henríquez y Carvajal – President of the Dominican Republic
- Lionel Belasco – Trinidadian pianist, composer and bandleader, best known for his calypso recordings
- Rafael Cansinos-Asséns – Spanish poet, essayist, literary critic and translator
- William Carlos Williams – American poet
- Pedro Henríquez Ureña – Dominican intellectual, essayist, philosopher, humanist, philologist and literary critic
- Amedeo Modigliani – Italian painter and sculptor
- Diego Rivera – Mexican painter
- Fernando Pessoa – Portuguese poet and writer.
- Vicente Lombardo Toledano – Mexican labor leader and philosopher
- Julio Lobo – Cuban sugar trader and financier
- Frieda Belinfante – Dutch cellist
- Evaristo Sourdis Juliao – Colombian diplomat, politician and presidential candidate
- Hal Pereira – American art director, production designer, and occasional architect
- William Pereira – American futurist architect
- Frank Silvera – Jamaican-born American character actor and theatrical director
- Lawrence Ferlinghetti – American poet, painter, liberal activist and co-founder of City Lights Bookstore
- Emmy Lopes Dias – Dutch actress and activist
- Vic Seixas – tennis player
- Peter Sellers – British comic actor, 1st-cousin-4x-removed of boxer Daniel Mendoza
- Harry Belafonte – (born Harold George Bellanfanti Jr.), American singer, songwriter, activist, and actor
- Arie Pais – Dutch politician and economist
- Herberto Hélder – Portuguese poet
- Pim de la Parra – Surinamese-Dutch film maker
- António Lobo Antunes – Portuguese novelist and medical doctor
- Ricardo Maduro – President of Honduras and Bank of Honduras chairman
- Uri Coronel – Dutch sports director and chairman of Ajax Amsterdam
- Cecilia Álvarez-Correa – first female Minister of Transport of Colombia
- Ophir Pines-Paz – Israeli politician
- Sean Paul (Henriques) – Jamaican dancehall musician.

== See also ==
- Sephardim
- History of the Jews in Spain
- History of the Jews in Portugal
  - History of the Jews in the Azores
  - Portuguese Inquisition
- History of the Jews in Morocco
- Sephardic Jews in the Netherlands
- History of the Marranos in England
- Portuguese Jewish community in Hamburg
- History of the Jews in Gibraltar
- History of the Jews in Jamaica
- History of the Jews in Barbados
- History of the Jews in Curaçao
  - Maduro Holding
  - Maduro & Curiel's Bank
- History of the Jews in Suriname
- Lançados
- Sephardic law and customs (for liturgy etc.)
- Anglo-Israelis

== Bibliography ==
=== General ===
- Altabé, David, Spanish and Portuguese Jewry before and after 1492: Brooklyn 1993
- Angel, Marc D., Remnant of Israel: A Portrait Of America's First Jewish Congregation: ISBN 978-1-878351-62-3
- Barnett, R. D., and Schwab, W., The Western Sephardim (The Sephardi Heritage Volume 2): Gibraltar Books, Northants., 1989
- Birmingham, S., The Grandees: America's Sephardic Elite: Syracuse 1971 repr. 1997 ISBN 978-0-8156-0459-4
- de Sola Pool, David and Tamar, An Old Faith in the New World: New York, Columbia University Press, 1955. ISBN 978-0-231-02007-7
- di Leone Leoni, Aron, The Hebrew Portuguese Nations in Antwerp and London at the time of Charles V and Henry VIII: new documents and interpretations, New Jersey 2005, ISBN 0-88125-866-0
- Dobrinsky, Herbert C.: A treasury of Sephardic laws and customs: the ritual practices of Syrian, Moroccan, Judeo-Spanish and Spanish and Portuguese Jews of North America. Revised ed. Hoboken, N.J.: KTAV; New York: Yeshiva Univ. Press, 1988. ISBN 978-0-88125-031-2
- Gubbay, Lucien and Levy, Abraham, The Sephardim: Their Glorious Tradition from the Babylonian Exile to the Present Day: paperback ISBN 978-1-85779-036-8; hardback ISBN 978-0-8276-0433-9 (a more general work but with notable information on the present day London S&P community)
- Hyamson, M., The Sephardim of England: A History of the Spanish and Portuguese Jewish Community 1492–1951: London 1951
- Katz and Serels (ed.), Studies on the History of Portuguese Jews: New York, 2004 ISBN 978-0-87203-157-9
- Laski, Neville, The Laws and Charities of the Spanish and Portuguese Jews' Congregation of London
- Meijer, Jaap (ed.), Encyclopaedia Sefardica Neerlandica: Uitgave van de Portugees-Israëlietische Gemeente: Amsterdam, 1949–1950 (2 vol., in Dutch): in alphabetical order, but only reaches as far as "Farar"
- Samuel, Edgar, At the End of the Earth: Essays on the history of the Jews in England and Portugal: London 2004 ISBN 978-0-902528-37-6
- Singerman, Robert, The Jews in Spain and Portugal: A Bibliography: 1975
- Singerman, Robert, Spanish and Portuguese Jewry: a classified bibliography: 1993 ISBN 978-0-313-25752-0
- Studemund-Halévy, Michael & Koj, P. (publ.), Sefarden in Hamburg: zur Geschichte einer Minderheit: Hamburg 1993–1997 (2 vol.)

=== Caribbean Jews ===
- Ezratty, Harry A., 500 Years in the Jewish Caribbean: The Spanish & Portuguese Jews in the West Indies, Omni Arts Publishers (November 2002); hardback ISBN 978-0-942929-18-8, paperback ISBN 978-0-942929-07-2
- Spanish and Portuguese Jews in the Caribbean and the Guianas: A Bibliography (Hardcover) John Carter Brown Library (June 1999) ISBN 978-0-916617-52-3
- Arbell, Mordechai, The Jewish Nation of the Caribbean: The Spanish-Portuguese Jewish Settlements in the Caribbean and the Guianas ISBN 978-965-229-279-7
- Arbell, Mordechai, The Portuguese Jews of Jamaica ISBN 978-976-8125-69-9
- Goldish, Josette Capriles, Once Jews: Stories of Caribbean Sephardim, Markus Weiner Publishers (2009) ISBN 978-1-55876-493-4

=== Synagogue architecture ===
- Kadish, Sharman; Bowman, Barbara; and Kendall, Derek, Bevis Marks Synagogue 1701–2001: A Short History of the Building and an Appreciation of Its Architecture (Survey of the Jewish Built Heritage in the United Kingdom & Ireland): ISBN 978-1-873592-65-6
- Treasures of a London temple: A descriptive catalogue of the ritual plate, mantles and furniture of the Spanish and Portuguese Jews' Synagogue in Bevis Marks: London 1951 ASIN B0000CI83D

=== Law and ritual ===
- Brandon, I. Oëb, (tr. Elisheva van der Voort), Complete manual for the reader of the Portuguese Israelitic Congregation in Amsterdam: Curaçao 1989. (The Dutch original was handwritten in 1892 and printed as an appendix to Encyclopaedia Sefardica Neerlandica, above.)
- Peter Nahon, Le rite portugais à Bordeaux d’après son Seder ḥazanut, Librairie orientaliste Paul Geuthner : Paris, 2018 ISBN 978-2-7053-3988-3. Description and analysis of the Spanish and Portuguese liturgy of Bordeaux, France.
- Gaguine, Shem Tob, Keter Shem Tob, 7 vols (in Hebrew): ketershemtob.com, vols. 1–2, vol. 3, vol. 6, vol. 7
- Salomon, H. P., Het Portugees in de Esnoga van Amsterdam. (A Língua Portuguesa na Esnoga de Amesterdão): Amsterdam 2002 (in Dutch). Portuguese phrases used in the synagogue service, with a CD showing correct pronunciation.
- Whitehill, G. H., The Mitsvot of the Spanish and Portuguese Jews' Congregation, London (Sha'ar Hashamayim): A guide for Parnasim: London 1969
- Peri Ets Haim (ed. Isaac Haim Abendana de Britto): vol. 1, vol. 2, vol. 3, vol. 4, vol. 5, vol. 6 (vol. 2 of new series), vol. 7 (vol. 3 of new series), vol. 8 (vol. 4 of new series), vol. 9, vol. 10, vol. 11, vol. 12
- Hirsch, Menko Max, Frucht vom Baum des Lebens. Ozer Peroth Ez Chajim. Die Sammlung der Rechtsgutachten Peri Ez Chajim des Rabbinerseminars Ets Haim zu Amsterdam. Zeitlich geordnet, ins Deutsche übertragen und in gekürzter Form herausgegeben: Antwerp and Berlin 1936, German abstract of the rulings in Peri Ets Haim
- Dayan Toledano, Pinchas, Fountain of Blessings, Code of Jewish Law (four volumes), Mekor bracha: Jerusalem 2009.
- de Sola Pool, David, The Traditional Prayer Book for Sabbath and Festivals: Behrman House, 1960.

=== Reza books (siddurim) ===
==== Latinoamerica ====
- Sidur Ḳol GaEl, HaShalem hebreo español, Rito Ḳ.Ḳ. Sefaradim, Según la costumbre judia Hispano portuguesa de las Ḳ.Ḳ. T.T. de Latinoamérica. Este sidur contiene los rezos diarios, Shabat, festividades y ciclo de la vida judía, en hebreo con traducción al español. Según las costumbres las comunidades en; Ámsterdam, Londres y América.https://a.co/d/9PJUsyP
- Sidur Ḳol GaEl, Según el Rito Ḳ.Ḳ. Sefaradim. Según la tradición judía hispano portuguesas de las Ḳ.Ḳ. T.T. de Latinoamérica.

En hebreo con traducción al español y fonética.Este sidur, contiene los rezos de la semana, Shabat y Rosh Jhodesh, en hebreo con traducción en español y fonética. Según la tradición de los judíos hispanos portugueses de Ámsterdam, Londres y América.https://a.co/d/1o5rJAN.

- Majhazor Kol GaEl Shel Pesajh: Kahal Kadosh Talmud Torá de Latinoamérica.Este Majhazor, contiene los rezos de la Festividad de Pesajh, en hebreo con traducción en español y fonética. Según la tradición de los judíos Hispanos portugueses de Ámsterdam, Londres y América.https://a.co/d/iBou5DE.
- Majhazor para Sukkot: Kahal Kadosh Talmud Torá de Latinoamérica.Majhazor Ḳol GaEl hel Sukkot. Según el Rito Ḳ.Ḳ. Sefaradim y Según la tradición de las Ḳ.Ḳ. T.T. en Latinoamérica. En hebreo con traducción al español y fonética. Este Majhazor, contiene los rezos de la Festividades de Sukkot, Shemini Jhag Ngatseret y Simjhát Torá, en hebreo con traducción en español y fonética. Según la tradición de los judíos Hispanos portugueses de Ámsterdam, Londres y América. https://a.co/d/8soA89n.
- Majhazor Kol GaEl shel Shabu'ngot: Kahal Kadosh Talmud Torá de Latinoamérica.Según el Rito Ḳ.Ḳ. Sefaradim. Según la tradición de las Ḳ.Ḳ. T.T. en Latinoamérica.

En hebreo con traducción al español y fonética. Este Majhazor, contiene los rezos de la festividad de Shabu’ngot, en hebreo con traducción en español y fonética. Según la tradición de los judíos Hispanos portugueses de Ámsterdam, Londres y América. https://a.co/d/2VigWDC.

- Majhazor Kol GaEl Rosh HaShaná: Kahal Kadosh Talmud Torá de Latinoamérica.Majhazor Ḳol GaEl Rosh HaShaná. Según el Rito Ḳ.Ḳ. Sefaradim, Según la tradición de las Ḳ.Ḳ. T.T. en Latinoamérica. En hebreo con traducción al español y fonética. Este Majhazor, contiene los rezos de Rosh HaShaná, en hebreo con traducción en español y fonética. Según la tradición de los judíos Hispanos portugueses de Ámsterdam, Londres y América. https://a.co/d/60hjlkz.

==== Italy ====
- Venice edition, 1524: reproduced in photostat in Remer, Siddur and Sefer Tefillat Ḥayim, Jerusalem 2003, available on the National Israel Library website, and reprinted in 1544, also available on the National Israel Library website
- Libro de Oraciones, Ferrara 1552 (Spanish only)
- Fiorentino, Salomone, Seder Tefilah סדר תפלה: Orazioni quotidiane per uso degli Ebrei Spagnoli e Portoghesi: questo volume contiene le tre orazioni giornaliere, quella del Sabbato e del capo di mese tradotte dall’idioma ebraico coll’aggiunta di alcune note e di qualche poetica versione Livorno, 1802.
- Fiorentino, Salomone, Seder Tefilah סדר תפלה: Orazioni quotidiane per uso degli ebrei spagnoli e portoghesi ... Vienna: Antonio Schmid, 1822.
- Fiorentino, Salomone, Seder Tefilah סדר תפלה: Orazioni quotidiane per uso degli ebrei spagnoli e portoghesi ... Livorno: Presso Natan Molco, 1825.
- Ottolenghi, Lazzaro E., Maḥzor le-yamim nora’im מחזור לימים נוראים: Orazioni ebraico-italiano per il capo d'anno e giorno dell;Espiazione: ad uso degli Israeliti Portoghesi e Spagnoli Livorno, 1821.
- Ottolenghi, Lazzaro E., Sefer Mo’ade H’: Orazioni ebraico-italiano per le tre annuali solennità: ad uso degli israeliti portoghesi e spagnoli Livorno, 1824.

==== France ====
- Venture, Mardochée, Prières Journalières à l'usage des Juifs portugais ou espagnols .. auxquelles on a ajoutés des notes élémentaires Nice, 1772.
- Venture, Mardochée, Prières des Jours du Ros-Haschana et du Jour de Kippour Nice 1773.
- Venture, Mardochée, Prières Journalières à l'usage des Juifs portugais ou espagnols .. traduites de l’hébreu: auxquelles on a ajoutés des notes élémentaires, nouvelle édition Paris: chez Lévy, 1807.
- Venture, Mardochée, Prières des Jours du Ros-Haschana et du Jour de Kippour, nouvelle édition Paris, 1807.
- Venture, Mardochée, Prières des Jours de Jeûnes de Guedalya, de Tebeth, d'Esther, de Tamouz et d’Ab Paris: chez Lévy, 1807.
- Venture, Mardochée, Prières des Fêtes de Pessah, Sebouhot, et de Souccot Paris: chez Lévy, 1807.
- Venture, Mardochée, Cantique des Cantique, avec la paraphrase chaldaïque, et traité d'Aboth ... précédé de la Haggada Paris: chez Lévy, 1807.
- Venture, Mardochée, Prières des jours de Rosch-haschana, à l’usage des Israélites du rit portugais, traduites de l’Hébreu avec des notes élémentaires déstinées à faciliter l’intelligence, par Mardochée Venture, nouvelle édition, première partie Paris: aux Bureaux des Archives Israélites, 1845.
- Venture, Mardochée, Prières du jour de Kippour à l’usage des Israélites, tr. par M. Venture, nouvelle édition, deuxième partie Paris: aux Bureaux des Archives Israélites, 1845.
- Venture, Mardochée, Prières des Fêtes de Pessah, Sebouhot, et de Souccot Paris, 2d ed., Paris: Lazard-Lévy, 1845.
- Créhange, Alexandre, מנחה חדשה: סדר תפלת ישראל כמנהג ספרד נעתקה ללשון צרפת על ידי אלכסנדר בן ברוך קריהנש: Offrande nouvelle: prières des Israélites du rite espangol et portugais, traduction de A. ben Baurch Créhange Paris, 1855.
- Créhange, Alexandre, Erech Hatephiloth où Prières des Grandes Fêtes à l’usage des Israélites du Rite Séfarad. Kippour. Léon Kaan éditeur, traduction française de A. Créhange Paris: Librairie Durlacher, 1925.
- Créhange, Alexandre, מחזור ליום כפורים זכור לאברהם: Rituel de Yom Kippour, rite séfarade, traduction française des prières par A. Créhange, Seli’hot, introduction et règles concernant Roche Hachana 4th ed. Paris: Les éditions Colbo, 1984.
- Créhange, Alexandre, מחזור לראש השנה זכור לאברהם: Rituel de Roche HaChana, rite séfarade, traduction française des prières par A. Créhange, transcription en caractères latine des principaux passages du Rituel, introduction et règles concernant le Yom Kippour 2d ed. Paris: Les éditions Colbo, 1984.
- Créhange, Alexandre, Rituel de Roche HaChana, rite séfarade, Editions du Scèptre, Colbo, 2006, ISBN 978-2-85332-171-6.
- Créhange, Alexandre, Rituel de Yom Kippour, rite séfarade 3rd ed., Editions du Scèptre, Colbo, 2006.
- Créhange, Alexandre, Rituel des Trois Fêtes, rite séfarade, Editions du Scèptre, Colbo, 2006, ISBN 978-2-85332-174-7.

==== Netherlands ====
- Menasseh ben Israel, Orden de Ros Asanah y Kipúr: Amsterdam 1630 (Spanish only)
- Seder ha-tefillot ke-minhag K"K Sefardim, with Dutch translation (S. Mulder): Amsterdam 1837
- Seder ha-mo'adim ke-minhag K"K Sefardim (festivals), with Dutch translation (S. Mulder): Amsterdam 1843
- Seder le-Rosh ha-Shanah ke-minhag K"K Sefardim (Rosh Hashanah), with Dutch translation (S. Mulder): Amsterdam 1849
- Seder le-Yom Kippur ke-minhag K"K Sefardim (Yom Kippur), with Dutch translation (S. Mulder): Amsterdam 1850
- Tefillat Kol Peh, ed. and tr. Ricardo: Amsterdam 1928, repr. 1950
- Hamishah Humshe Torah u-Tfillot le-Shabbat (Koren), Jerusalem 2017

==== English-speaking countries ====
- Isaac Nieto, Orden de las Oraciones de Ros-Ashanah y Kipur, London 1740
- Nieto, Orden de las Oraciones Cotidianas, Ros Hodes Hanuca y Purim, London 1771
- A. Alexander, 6 vols, London 1771–77, including:
  - The Liturgy According to the Spanish and Portuguese Jews in Hebrew and English, as Publicly Read in the Synagogue, and Used By All Their Families (vol 3)
  - The tabernacle service which are publicly read in the synagogue. By the Spanish and Portuguese Jews. And used by all families (vol 4)
  - The Festival service which are publicly read in the synagogue by the Spanish and Portuguese Jews and used by all families
  - Evening and morning service of the beginning [sic] of the year, which are publicly read in the synagogue by the Spanish and Portuguese Jews, and used by all families
  - The fasts days service. Which are publickly read in the synagogue. By the Spanish and Portuguese Jews and used by all families (vol 6)
- The Order of Forms of Prayer (6 vols.), David Levi: London 1789–96, repr. 1810
- Forms of Prayer According to the Custom of the Spanish and Portuguese Jews, D. A. de Sola, London 1836
- Siddur Sifte Tsaddikim, the Forms of Prayer According to the Custom of the Spanish and Portuguese Jews, Isaac Leeser, Philadelphia (6 vols.) 1837–8
- Forms of Prayer According to the Custom of the Spanish and Portuguese Jews, Abraham de Sola, Philadelphia 1878
- Book of Prayer of the Spanish and Portuguese Jews' Congregation, London (5 vols.), Moses Gaster, 1901
- Book of Prayer of the Spanish and Portuguese Jews' Congregation, London (5 vols.): Oxford (Oxford Univ. Press, Vivian Ridler), 5725–1965 (since reprinted)
- Book of Prayer: According to the Custom of the Spanish and Portuguese Jews, David de Sola Pool, New York: Union of Sephardic Congregations, 1941, 1954 (later edition 1979) (The 1960 printing is scanned and available here.)
- Gaon, Solomon, Minhath Shelomo: a commentary on the Book of prayer of the Spanish and Portuguese Jews: New York 1990 (based on de Sola Pool edition)
- Daily and festival prayers books, Congregation Shearith Israel: New York. Published prayer books for the Spanish and Portuguese Congregation

=== Musical traditions ===
- Adler, Israel: Musical life and traditions of the Portuguese Jewish community of Amsterdam in the 18th century. (Yuval Monograph Series; v. 1.) Jerusalem: Magnes, 1974.
- Aguilar, Emanuel & De Sola, David A.:. טללי זמרה Sephardi melodies, being the traditional liturgical chants of the Spanish & Portuguese Jews’ Congregation London, London 1857. Second edition publ by the Society of Heshaim with the sanction of the Board of Elders of the Congregation, Oxford Univ. Press, 5691–1931.
- Kanter, Maxine Ribstein: "High Holy Day hymn melodies in the Spanish and Portuguese synagogues of London", in Journal of Synagogue Music X (1980), No. 2, pp. 12–44
- Kramer, Leon & Guttmann, Oskar: Kol Shearit Yisrael: Synagogue Melodies Transcontinental Music Corporation, New York, 1942.
- Lopes Cardozo, Abraham: Sephardic songs of praise according to the Spanish-Portuguese tradition as sung in the synagogue and home. New York, 1987.
- Rodrigues Pereira, Martin: חָכְמַת שְׁלֹמֹה (‘Hochmat Shelomoh) Wisdom of Solomon: Torah cantillations according to the Spanish and Portuguese custom Tara Publications, 1994
- Seroussi, Edwin: Spanish-Portuguese synagogue music in nineteenth-century Reform sources from Hamburg: ancient tradition in the dawn of modernity. (Yuval Monograph Series; XI) Jerusalem: Magnes, 1996. ISSN 0334-3758
- Seroussi, Edwin: "Livorno: A Crossroads in the History of Sephardic Religious Music", from Horowitz and Orfali (ed.), The Mediterranean and the Jews: Society, Culture and Economy in early modern Times
- Swerling, Norman P.: Romemu-Exalt: the music of the Sephardic Jews of Curaçao. Tara Publications, 1997. ISBN 978-0-933676-79-4.

=== Discography ===
- Musiques de la Synagogue de Bordeaux: Patrimoines Musicaux Des Juifs de France (Buda Musique 822742), 2003.
- Talele Zimrah – Singing Dew: The Florence-Leghorn Jewish Musical Tradition (Beth Hatefutsot) 2002.
- Choral Music of Congregation Shearith Israel, Congregation Shearith Israel, 2003.
- Traditional Music of Congregation Shearith Israel (Shearith Israel League) 3 CD's.
- Jewish Voices in the New World: Chants and Prayers from the American Colonial Era: Miliken Archive (Naxos) 2003
- Sephardic Songs of Praise: Abraham L. Cardozo (Tara Publications)
- The Western Sefardi Liturgical Tradition: Abraham Lopes Cardozo (The Jewish Music Research Center- Hebrew University) 2004
- A Sephardi Celebration The Choir of the Spanish & Portuguese Jews' Congregation, London, Maurice Martin, Adam Musikant (The Classical Recording Company)
- Kamti Lehallel: I Rise in Praise, Daniel Halfon (Beth Hatefutsot) 2007
