= Israel Baer Kursheedt =

American Merchant leader

Israel Baer Kursheedt (April 6, 1766 – April 30, 1852) was a German-born Jewish-American merchant, broker, and communal leader.

== Life ==
Kursheedt was born on April 6, 1766 in Singhofen, Germany. His father died when he was young, after which his mother took him to the village of Kursheidt, near Königswinter. He later took his surname, Kursheedt, from the village.

Kursheedt attended the yeshiva in Frankfurt, headed at the time by Rabbi Nathan Adler. His classmates included Rabbi Abraham Bing, the future chief rabbi of Würzburg, and the translator and commentator of the machzor Rabbi Wolf Heidenheim of Rodelheim, He studied in the yeshiva until General Custine and the French army seized Frankfurt during the French Revolutionary Wars. He then obtained a contract to supply the Prussian army with provisions, which proved successful until the Peace of Basel caused the Prussian Army on the Rhine to be dismantled and his employment terminated. This led to him to decide to leave Germany. He went to Hamburg, where he initially intended to get passage to England, but when he heard of an American sloop that was heading to Boston and that there was a Jewish community there, he decided to go there instead and received letters of introduction for Moses Michael Hays of Boston and Isaac Moses of New York City. When he arrived in Boston in 1796 and learned that Hays was the only Jew in the city, he stayed there for a short time before he left for New York City.

Kursheedt joined Congregation Shearith Israel, the only synagogue in New York City at the time, and befriended its rabbi, Gershom Mendes Seixas. Seixas came to turn to him for questions on Jewish law due to his years of intense Torah study, which made him the only real rabbinical scholar in America at the time. Believing in the need for Jewish education, he became involved with Yeshibat Minhat Arab, which Shearith Israel organized. In 1808, he was appointed to a committee of six to draft a detailed proposal and regulations to reorganize the Yeshibat into a real Jewish day school for children. The school existed until 1822. In 1810, he was elected president of Shearith Israel and served a single term in that position.

Economic conditions were not great in New York City during that time, and in 1812 he moved to Richmond, Virginia with his family. They went by stagecoach and his Hebrew library and Masonic paraphernalia went by ship, but the ship carrying his property was captured due to the ongoing War of 1812. Everything was returned to him years later with the help of a fellow Freemason. In Richmond, he helped reorganize and enlarge Kahal Kadosh Beth Shalome and officiated as Reader. During that time, he became acquainted with Thomas Jefferson and Isaac Leesser. He returned to New York City with his family in 1824. In 1825, a group of Ashkenazic Jews, who by then made up a majority of Shearith Israel for a century, grew tired of the rigidly Sephardic rituals of the congregation. When their petition to hold separate services was denied, they seceded and established their own synagogue, B'nai Jeshurun. Kursheedt, despite Rabbi Seixas being his friend and father-in-law, joined the new congregation. In 1834, he organized the Hebrath Terumath Hakodesh, a charity dedicated to helping the Jewish community in Palestine. In 1840, when American Jews organized to protest the Damascus Affair, he was elected chairman of the action committee and wrote to President Martin Van Buren to request the American consul in Alexandria use his influence to obtain a fair trial for the accused Syrian Jews. He also served as president of the Hebrew Mutual Benefit Society.

In 1804, Kursheedt married Sarah Abigail Seixas, daughter of Rabbi Gershom Mendes Seixas. They had four sons and five daughters, including Asher Kursheedt, the founder of the Kursheedt Manufacturing Company of New York, and Gershom Kursheedt, a philanthropist, newspaper publisher, and communal leader of the Jewish community in New Orleans.

Kursheedt died at home on April 30, 1852. Rabbi Samuel Myer Isaacs delivered the eulogy. He was buried in the Shearith Israel section of Beth Olam Cemetery.
