= Nathan Bijur =

Jewish-American lawyer and judge

Justice of the New York Supreme Court
- In office 1909–1930

Personal details
- Born: June 1, 1862 New York City, New York, United States
- Died: July 8, 1930 New York City, New York, United States
- Education: Columbia College (Ph.B.); Columbia Law School (LL.B.); Columbia University (Ph.D.)
- Occupation: Lawyer, judge

Nathan Bijur (June 1, 1862 – July 8, 1930), was a Jewish-American lawyer and jurist who served as a Justice of the New York Supreme Court from 1909 until his death. Before joining the bench, he practised corporate law in New York City and was involved in major railroad and commercial reorganisations. Beyond his judicial career, Bijur was active in civic and philanthropic work, particularly in Jewish charitable organisations, social welfare initiatives, and legal reform efforts in New York.

== Life ==
Bijur was born on June 1, 1862, in New York City, New York, the son of Asher Bijur and Pauline Sondheim. His father was a Prussian immigrant who worked as a tobacco merchant.

Bijur attended Doctor Chapin's and Doctor Sach's schools. He then graduated from Columbia College with a Ph.B. in political science in 1881. This was followed by an LL.B. from Columbia Law School in 1882 and a Ph.D. in political science in 1883. He was admitted to the bar in 1884, at which point he began practicing law with Isaac L. Rice under the firm name Rice & Bijur. The firm grew into an extensive practice, focused on corporate law. He was involved in, among other litigations, the reorganization of the Southern Railway, the Philadelphia & Reading Railway, the Richmond Terminal Co., the Distillers Corp., and other large interests. In 1909, he represented the New York City, Philadelphia, and Boston chambers of commerce and the New York and Boston merchants before the Interstate Commerce Commission as part of the Spokane Rate Case, which involved hearings in all important Rocky Mountain and Pacific coast terminals and governing rates between eastern and western cities.

In 1909, while working on the Spokane Rate Case, Bijur was elected Justice of the New York Supreme Court as a Republican with the endorsement of the Independence League. He was re-elected in 1923 with support from both the Republican and Democratic parties. As Justice, he was involved in a number of cases related to constitutional law and the extension of legal doctrines to meet modern social and economic standards. His rulings were affirmed by the higher courts at a high rate, and was frequently chosen by the Appellate Division as presiding judge of the Appellate Term to hear appeals from the municipal and city courts. His cases involved, among other things, hastening the adoption of the multiple dwelling law and invalidating the 1929 municipal emergency rent law. He was still serving on the Supreme Court when he died, and Bernard L. Shientag was appointed to fill his unexpired term.

Bijur was a founder of the National Conference of Jewish Charities and the American Jewish Committee and a trustee of the Baron de Hirsch Fund and the Hebrew Free Trade School. A supporter of the Hebrew Sheltering and Immigrant Aid Society, he was often consulted on legal questions related to Jewish immigration. He was part of a special commission that established a municipal ambulance service in New York City. In 1905, he was elected president of the New York Conference of Charities. Mayor Seth Low appointed him to a commission to investigate the riot at the funeral of Rabbi Jacob Joseph. He was vice-president of the United Hebrew Charities. In 1907, Governor Charles Evans Hughes appointed him to the state prison commission. He was also affiliated with the Tuskegee Institute, Atlanta University, the Civil Service Reform Association, and the Legal Aid Society. He was an occasional contributor to the Jewish press.

Bijur was a founder of The Forum magazine in 1887. He was a director, law committee member of the Sanitary Aid Society, inspecting 26,000 tenement houses for the society during its crusade against tenement houses. He was a member of the American Bar Association, the New York State Bar Association, the New York County Lawyers' Association, the New York City Bar Association, the American Society of International Law, the Academy of Political Science, the Educational Alliance, Phi Beta Kappa, the City Club of New York, and the Harmonie Club. He attended Congregation B'nai Jeshurun. In 1886, he married Lilly Pronich of Galveston, Texas. They had one son, Harry.

Bijur died in St. Luke's Hospital from empyema after nearly eight weeks of pleurisy on July 8, 1930. His funeral service in B'nai Jeshurun was attended by Chief Judge of the New York Court of Appeals Benjamin N. Cardozo, former New York City Bar Association president William D. Guthrie, New York City Bar Association Charles C. Burlingham, Republican leader Samuel S. Koenig, New York Supreme Court Justices Albert C. Cohn, Ernest E. L. Hammer, Edward J. McGoldrick, George V. Mullan, John F. Carew, Alfred Frankenthaler, Aaron J. Levy, Thomas W. Churchill, and Irwin Untermyer, former presiding judge of the Appellate Division John Proctor Clarke, former Court of Appeals Justice Samuel Seabury, Appellate Division Justice Edward R. Finch, former Appellate Division Justice Alfred R. Page, former City Court Justice Gustave Hartman, General Sessions Judge Otto A. Rosalsky, and Metropolitan Life Insurance Company president Lee K. Frankel. Rabbi Israel Goldstein delivered the eulogy. He was buried in Beth Olam Cemetery.
