= Henry S. Jacobs =

Jamaican-American rabbi (1827–1893)

Henry Samuel Jacobs (March 22, 1827 – September 12, 1893) was a Jamaican-American rabbi who mostly ministered in the American South and New York City.

== Life ==
Jacobs was born on March 22, 1827 in Kingston, Jamaica, the son of Samuel and Rebecca Jacobs. His brother was Rabbi George Jacobs.

Jacobs studied for the rabbinate in Kingston, first under Moses N. Nathan and then under Dr. Stern and Morenu Stenklar. In 1846, he was elected master of the school attached to the German congregation in Kingston. When he was 21, he became rabbi of the Neveh Shalom Congregation in Spanish Town. He later became rabbi of the Shaare Shalom Synagogue in Kingston. In 1854, he immigrated to America and initially settled in New York City, New York. A month later, he was elected rabbi of Kahal Kadosh Beth Shalome in Richmond, Virginia. Shortly after arriving in Richmond, he became principal of the Hebrew English Academy. In 1857, he became rabbi of Shearith Israel in Charleston, South Carolina. He served as rabbi there until 1862.

When Charleston was attacked in the Battle of Secessionville during the American Civil War, Shearith Israel's congregation dispersed and Jacobs, following advice from the board of trustees, joined many of his congregants in Columbia. When Columbia was burned in February 1865, he lost his earthly possessions and left for Augusta, Georgia and stayed there for a year. After the Civil War, Shearith Israel was heavily damaged and the remaining congregants were too poor to afford repairing the building or continue holding services, leading Jacobs to resign in 1866. At the time, he was also rabbi of Bnai Israel in Augusta.

In 1866, Jacobs became rabbi of the Nefutzot Yehudah (Portuguese) Synagogue in New Orleans, Louisiana. Long interested in education, he was first president and superintendent of the city's Hebrew Education Society. He was a Conservative Jew. A member of the Freemasons, he served as Chair of the Committee on Foreign Correspondence of the Grand Lodge of Louisiana. He resigned from the Portuguese Synagogue in 1874 due to a disagreement with the community, and shortly afterwards he was elected rabbi of Shangarai Chasset. A few months later, he was elected rabbi of Congregation Shearith Israel in New York City. When his two-year contract was almost expired, he asked for it to be cancelled. In 1876, he was named rabbi of B'nai Jeshurun. He served as rabbi there for the rest of his life. He was the first president of the Board of Jewish Ministers of New York, an office he held until he died, and served as vice-president of the New York branch of the Alliance Israélite Universelle. In 1890, New York University gave him an honorary D.D. degree, the first time a rabbi received such a degree from them.

Jacobs died on September 12, 1893. His funeral was held at B'nai Jeshurun, where Rabbi Bernard Drachman read a Psalm, Cantor Edward Kartschmaroff chanted a prayer, Rabbi Alexander Kohut gave an address in German, and Rabbi Stephen S. Wise delivered the eulogy, and Rabbi Joseph Silverman offered a prayer. He was buried at Cypress Hills Cemetery, where Rabbis Henry Pereira Mendes, Aaron Wise, and Stephen S. Wise gave addresses.
