= Baiz =

Baiz is a surname. Notable people with the surname include:

- Andrés Baiz (born 1975), Colombian film director and screenwriter
- Arsalan Baiz (born 1950), Iraqi Kurdish politician
- Jacob Baiz (1843–1899), American merchant and diplomat
