= Selig Newman =

- Born: 1788; Posen, Poznań Voivodeship, Polish–Lithuanian Commonwealth
- Died: 20 February 1871 (aged 83); Williamsburg, New York City, United States

Academic work
- Institutions: University of Oxford
- Notable students: Archibald Campbell Tait, Morris Jacob Raphall, David Woolf Marks
- Writing career
- Notable work: The Challenge Accepted (1850)

Selig Newman (1788, Posen – 20 February 1871, Williamsburg, Brooklyn) was a Polish-born Hebraist and educator.

== Biography ==
Selig Newman was born and educated at Posen. He devoted himself to Biblical studies, and at an early age he was given an office in the chief synagogue of Berlin. Newman moved to England in 1814, and was soon afterwards appointed minister to the Jewish community of Plymouth by Chief Rabbi Solomon Hirschell. While in London, Newman took part in spirited public debates at the Freemasons' Tavern with Christian missionaries. Having challenged any Jewish convert or learned Christian to dispute with him on Old Testament messianic prophecies, he held a well-attended public disputation with Joseph Wolff on 8 March 1827. Newman also delivered regular Shabbat sermons at the Jews' Free School, the building being always crowded by anxious listeners.

At the same time, Newman taught Hebrew at the University of Oxford. As a Jew, Newman was debarred from a professorship, but among his pupils were many distinguished Christian and Jewish scholars, including Morris Jacob Raphall, David Woolf Marks, and future Archbishop of Canterbury Archibald Campbell Tait. Newman left for the United States in about 1849 and settled in New York City, gaining a livelihood as a teacher and writer. He died there in February 1871, and was buried in the Beth Olam Cemetery.

== Work ==
In 1850 he published a polemical tract in answer to Christian missionaries, entitled The Challenge Accepted, consisting of a series of dialogues between a Jew and a Christian respecting the fulfilment of the prophecies on the advent of the Messiah. The work explained crucial biblical passages, mostly in the Books of Genesis and Isaiah, and then moved on to question the authenticity of the gospel literature based on inner contradictions.

Other publications of Newman include Emendations of the English Version of the Old Testament (1839); a Hebrew and English Lexicon (1841); and a Hebrew grammar, which was much used for elementary instruction among English Jews. Manuscripts of a condensed translation of the Bible were found after his death.
