= Joseph Mayor Asher =

Jewish English-American rabbi and professor

Joseph Mayor Asher

Joseph Mayor Asher (September 23, 1872 – November 9, 1909) was a Jewish English-American rabbi and professor.

== Life ==
Asher was born on September 23, 1872, in Manchester, England, the son of Rabbi Aaron Asher and Betsey Jacobs.

Asher attended Owens College, graduating from there with a B.A. in 1898 and an M.A. in 1901. While attending Owens, he received the University Scholarship in Philosophy in 1898 and had the Langton Fellowship in Philosophy from 1898 to 1900. He was also an Advanced Student of Trinity College, Cambridge from 1898 to 1900. He was ordained a rabbi in 1893. The descendant of Russian rabbis, he went to study in the Yeshiva of Kovno in 1889. While studying in Cambridge after returning to England, he fell under the influence of Solomon Schechter and again left England to study at the University of Bonn. He returned to Manchester after he was ordained a rabbi, acting as dayan (judicial assessor) in cases involving Jews in Manchester courts and helping organize the Manchester Talmud Torah School system. His rabbinical diploma was granted by Rabbi David Tevel Katzenellenbogen of Suwałki.

In 1901, Asher immigrated to America and became the rabbi of B'nai Jeshurun in New York City. He served as the rabbi there until 1907, when he became rabbi of Orach Chaim in New York City. He served as rabbi there for the rest of his life. In 1902, he became professor of homiletics of the Jewish Theological Seminary of America and was put in charge of the Seminary's department of philosophy and ethics. He also contributed an article on Jewish food and health laws to the Encyclopedia Americana and wrote reviews for the International Journal of Ethics and the Critical Review.

Asher died at home from a weakened heart on November 9, 1909. His funeral took place in his synagogue, with Rabbi Henry Pereira Mendes officiating the ceremony. He was buried in Beth Olam Cemetery in the Shearith Israel section.
