= Isaac Pinto =

American Jewish merchant, scholar and translator (1720–1791)

- Born: June 12, 1720; Probably Portugal
- Died: January 17, 1791 (aged 70); New York City, U.S.
- Occupations: Merchant, translator, teacher
- Known for: First English translations of the Jewish liturgy for synagogue use, published in America (1761, 1766)

Isaac Pinto (June 12, 1720 – January 17, 1791) was an American Jewish merchant and scholar in New York City. He translated the Jewish liturgy into English in two volumes, Evening Service of Roshashanah, and Kippur (1761) and Prayers for Shabbath, Rosh-Hashanah, and Kippur (1766), the first Jewish prayer books published in America and the first English translations of the liturgy intended for use in worship. A friend of Ezra Stiles and a supporter of the Patriot cause, he was among the first official translators employed by the United States government, and was remembered at his death as a linguist, historian and philosopher.

== Early life ==
Pinto was of Sephardic ancestry and was probably born in Portugal; his tombstone gives his date of birth as June 12, 1720. His family came to America sometime before 1740, possibly by way of Jamaica. He appears on the roll of New York's Congregation Shearith Israel, then the city's only synagogue, for 1740–41. He went into the import-export trade, traveled widely and lived in several places; an Isaac Pinto, possibly the same man, was living in Stratford, Connecticut, by 1748.

== Prayer book translations ==
By the mid-18th century, many American Jews could no longer read Hebrew well. In 1761 W. Weyman of New York printed Evening Service of Roshashanah, and Kippur: or the Beginning of the Year and the Day of Atonement, an English translation of the evening services for the High Holy Days. It appeared anonymously, but Pinto is almost certainly its translator. It was the second published English translation of Hebrew liturgy, after The Form of Prayer Which Was Performed at the Jews' Synagogue (New York, 1760), a short thanksgiving service.

In 1766 John Holt printed a fuller volume, Prayers for Shabbath, Rosh-Hashanah, and Kippur, or the Sabbath, the Beginning of the Year, and the Day of Atonement; with the Amidah and Musaph of the Moadim or Solemn Seasons, According to the Order of the Spanish and Portuguese Jews, this time under Pinto's name. Both volumes contained the English translation only, without the Hebrew text.

An English version of the prayers had appeared in London in 1738, but as part of a descriptive book on Jewish ceremonies, not for use in services; Pinto's volumes are regarded as the first English translations of the Jewish prayer book intended for worship.

== Politics and government service ==
Pinto supported the American cause in the years before the Revolution and wrote articles in its favor, including in the New York Journal. In 1770 he signed a non-importation agreement.

His command of languages led to his appointment in 1781, under the authority of the Continental Congress, as one of the first official translators employed by the United States government, working in the Department of Foreign Affairs, the predecessor of the State Department.

== Scholarship and later life ==
Pinto was a friend and correspondent of Ezra Stiles, president of Yale College, who as late as 1790 described him in his diary as "a learned Jew at New York." Stiles's account indicates that Pinto was a good Hebrew scholar who read Ibn Ezra in the original.

When New York's Jewish community reorganized in 1784, after the British evacuation, Pinto was asked to become clerk of the congregation but apparently declined
