= George Jacobs (rabbi) =

Jamaican-American rabbi

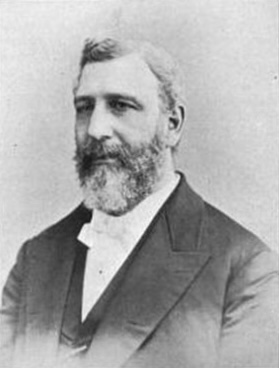

George Jacobs (September 24, 1834 – July 14, 1884) was a Jamaican-American rabbi.

== Life ==
Jacobs was born on September 24, 1834, in Kingston, Jamaica, the son of Samuel and Rebecca Jacobs. His brother was Henry S. Jacobs.

Jacobs immigrated to America when he was around 20 and settled in Richmond, Virginia, where he initially worked as a merchant. He later focused on theological and rabbinic studies. When his brother Henry resigned as Hazan of Kahal Kadosh Beth Shalome in 1857, he began officiating. He wasn't officially made Minister of the congregation until 1866. In 1869, he succeeded the late Isaac Leeser as rabbi of Beth El Emeth in Philadelphia, Pennsylvania. He served as rabbi there for the rest of his life. He also served as an officer of B'nai B'rith, Kesher Shel Barzel, and the Free Sons of Israel. He was also a member of the Freemasons and Chaplain of a Grand Lodge.

Jacobs was a founder of the Young Men's Hebrew Association of Philadelphia, the Board of Jewish Ministers of Philadelphia, and the American Jewish Publication Society. He contributed to the Philadelphia Jewish press and aided in revising the English translation of the Szold-Jastrow Prayer-Book. He published several catechisms, including Catechism for Elementary Instruction in the Hebrew Faith.

In 1856, Jacobs married Adeline H. Levy of Richmond in a ceremony performed by his brother Henry. Adeline's father was Jacob A. Levy, president of Kahal Kadosh Beth Shalome.

Jacobs died on July 14, 1884. He was buried in the Beth-El-Emeth Cemetery.
