= Beth Olam Cemetery =

Historic site in Brooklyn, New York

- U.S. National Register of Historic Places
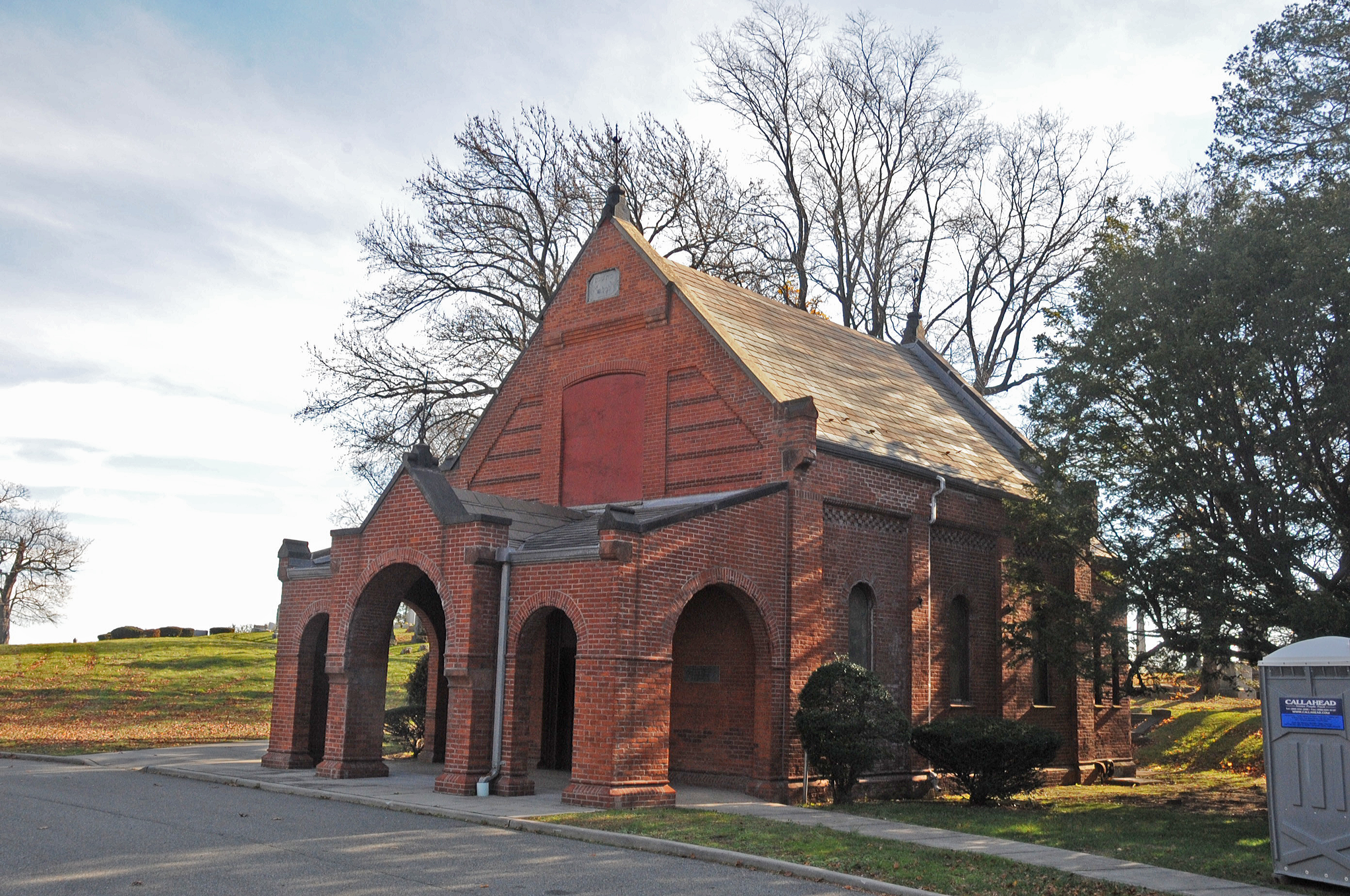

- Location within New York City Location within New York Location within the United States
- Location: 2 Cypress Hills St., Brooklyn, New York
- Coordinates: 40°41′26″N 73°52′48″W
- Area: 12.37 acres (5.01 ha)
- Built: 1851
- NRHP reference No.: 16000254
- Added to NRHP: May 16, 2016

The Beth Olam Cemetery is a historic cemetery in Cypress Hills, Brooklyn, New York, United States. It is located in the city's Cemetery Belt, bisected by the border between Brooklyn and Queens.

It is a rural cemetery in style, and was started in 1851 by three Manhattan Jewish congregations: Congregation Shearith Israel (Spanish Portuguese) on West 70th Street, B'nai Jeshurun on West 89th Street, and Temple Shaaray Tefila on East 79th Street.

In 1882, Calvert Vaux was commissioned to design a small, red brick Metaher house or place of purification and pre-burial eulogies, near the entrance to the Shearith Israel section, and also designed its gates. It is the only religious building that Vaux, the co-designer of Central Park, is known to have designed. Many mausoleum windows are made with Tiffany stained glass and LaFarge bronze doors.

The burial ground contains many examples of architecture and funerary art.

== Notable burials ==
- Joseph Mayor Asher (1872–1908), English-born American rabbi of B'nai Jeshurun and professor at the Jewish Theological Seminary of America
- Nathan Bijur (1862–1930), American lawyer and New York Supreme Court Justice
- Abraham Cohn (1832–1897), American Civil War Union Army soldier and recipient of the Medal of Honor
- Abraham Lopes Cardozo (1914–2006), Dutch-born hazzan of Congregation Shearith Israel
- Benjamin Cardozo (1870–1938), American lawyer and Associate Justice of the Supreme Court of the United States
- Jacob de Haas (1872–1937), British-born journalist and an early leader of the Zionist movement in the United States and England.
- Emanuel Lasker (1868–1941), German chess player, second World Chess Champion.
- Emma Lazarus (1849–1887), American author, poet, and activist, who wrote the sonnet "The New Colossus" describing the Statue of Liberty; niece of Jacques Judah Lyons
- Uriah P. Levy (1792–1862), American naval officer, real estate investor, philanthropist, and the first Jewish Commodore of the United States Navy
- Jacques Judah Lyons (1814–1877), Surinamese-born American rabbi of Congregation Shearith Israel; uncle of Emma Lazarus
- Henry Pereira Mendes (1852–1937) British-born American rabbi of Congregation Shearith Israel
- Benjamin F. Peixotto (1834–1890), American lawyer and diplomat
- Judith Salzedo Peixotto (1823–1881), American teacher and principal
- N. Taylor Phillips (1868–1955), American lawyer and politician
- David de Sola Pool (1885–1970), British-born American rabbi of Congregation Shearith Israel
- Moses J. Stroock (1866–1931), American lawyer

== See also ==
- List of burial places of justices of the Supreme Court of the United States
