= Moses Henriques =

Moses Henriques may refer to:

- Moses Cohen Henriques, Sephardic pirate
- Moises Henriques (born 1987), Australian cricketer
