= Alvin Deutsch =

American lawyer (1932–2021)

- Born: February 9, 1932
- Died: October 6, 2021 (aged 89)
- Education: Johns Hopkins University; Yale Law School
- Occupation: Attorney
- Employer(s): McLaughlin & Stern
- Known for: Copyright law
- Spouse: Davida Miriam Tenenbaum

Alvin Deutsch (February 9, 1932 - October 6, 2021) was a copyright attorney known for his work with Peggy Lee, Scott Rudin and the estate of Harper Lee.

== Education ==
Deutsch was an alumnus of Johns Hopkins University and Yale Law School.

== Career ==
Deutsch served as legal counsel for Goodspeed Opera House. His work allowed the theater to establish a new model of revenue stemming from original productions, which changed the landscape for non-profit theatres. He co-founded Linden and Deutsch and later became partner at McLaughlin & Stern. He was an adjunct professor specializing in copyright at Cardozo Law School. He served as Parnas at Congregation Shearith Israel in Manhattan.

== Personal life ==
Deutsch married Davida Miriam Tenenbaum in May 1967.
