= Jacob Baiz =

Jacob Baiz (January 17, 1843 – June 20, 1899) was a Venezuelan-born Jewish-American merchant and diplomat.

== Life ==
Baiz was born on January 17, 1843, in Barcelona, Venezuela, the son of Abraham Baiz and Sarah Naar. He came with them to the United States of America when he was eight years old, initially settling in Elizabethport, New Jersey.

Baiz returned to Venezuela in 1863 as a merchant in ordinary and military equipment. He later became a commission merchant in New York CIty and exported American-made goods to Central and South America. This earned him a reputation in those areas and made him a friend of several Central American presidents. At one point, he planned and constructed a Venezuelan railroad he became president of. He was the first merchant to introduce Guatemalan coffee to the United States.

In 1874, Baiz was appointed Consul-General of Guatemala by the Guatemalan President Justo Rufino Barrios, a friend of his. He held that position for fifteen years. At one point, he asserted Guatemala's right to expel any offensive foreigner, which led to him being sued for libel by an American who claimed the decree of expulsion against him was libelous. Baiz was supported by the Guatemalan government and his defense before the District Court of the United States proved successful. He contended the suit brought against be brought before the Supreme Court of the United States since he was Consul-General, although the Court held that as Consul-General he didn't have formal diplomatic functions and couldn't invoke Constitutional privileges given to "ambassadors and other public ministers." He was also appointed Consul-General of Honduras by the Honduran President Marco Aurelio Soto, a position he held for several years, and Consul-General of El Salvador by the Salvadorian President Rafael Zaldívar. In 1886, as Consul-General of Honduras, he prevented a filibustering expedition by the steamer City of Mexico and instituted proceedings in the Admiralty Court against the steamer that resulted in its condemnation. For his actions, Honduras made him a Brigadier-General.

Baiz was prominently involved in a number of civic, educational, charitable, and religious organizations in New York City. He was vice-president of the Hebrew Sheltering and Guardian Society and helped secure historical data on Jews in South America and the West Indies for the American Jewish Historical Society. He was a member of Congregation Shearith Israel. He was also a member of the Chamber of Commerce, the Produce Exchange, the Coffee Exchange, the Freemasons, and the Royal Arch Masonry.

Baiz died at home from heart disease on June 20, 1899. He had a wife, son, and two daughters. He was buried in Woodlawn Cemetery.
