= Morris Jacob Raphall =

American rabbi (1798–1868)

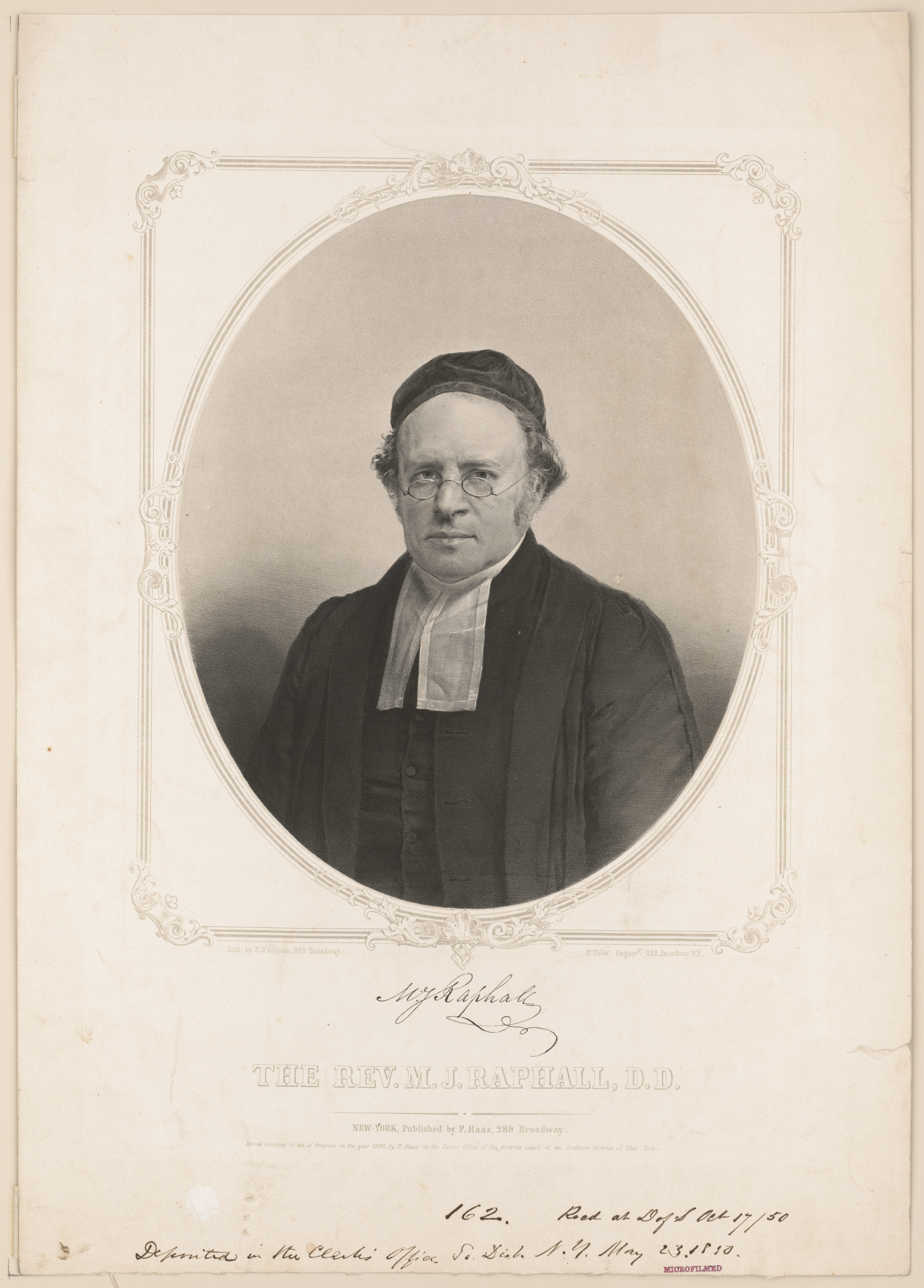
Morris Jacob Raphall (1850)

Morris Jacob Raphall (October 3, 1798 – June 23, 1868) was a rabbi and author born in Stockholm, Sweden. From 1849 until his death he resided in the United States. He is most remembered for having declared, on the eve of the Civil War, that the Bible and God endorse slavery.

== Biography ==
At the age of nine Raphall was taken by his father, who was banker to the King of Sweden, to Copenhagen, where he was educated at the Hebrew grammar school. "He was educated for the Jewish ministry in the college of his faith in Copenhagen, in England, where he went in 1812, and afterward in the University of Giessen, where he studied in 1821-24." Raphall married Rachel Goldston on August 3, 1825 and they had five children (Alfred, James, Esther, Charles, and Isabella). Rachel was one of seven children of Manasseh Goldston (also known as Goldstein and Goulston). In February 1827 Raphall was named as a defendant in an insurance fraud case involving a fire at a fur shop owned by his brother in law Noah Goldston. Raphall was found guilty and sentenced to 18 months prison. He devoted himself to the study of languages, for the better acquisition of which he subsequently traveled in France, Germany, and Belgium. He received the Ph.D. degree from the University of Erlangen (Germany). After lecturing on Hebrew poetry in 1834 he began to publish the Hebrew Review, and Magazine of Rabbinical Literature, the first Jewish periodical in England; he was forced to discontinue it in 1836 owing to ill health.

For some time he acted as honorary secretary to Solomon Herschell, chief rabbi of Great Britain. He made translations from Maimonides, Albo, and Herz Wessely; conjointly with the Rev. D. A. de Sola he published a translation of eighteen treatises of the Mishnah; he also began a translation of the Pentateuch, of which only the first volume appeared. In 1840, when the blood accusation was made at Damascus, he traveled to Syria to aid in the investigation, and published a refutation of it in four languages (Hebrew, English, French, and German). He also wrote a defense of Judaism against an anonymous writer in the London Times. Raphall was also the author of a text-book of the post-Biblical history of the Jews (to the year 70 C.E.).

In 1841 he was appointed minister of the Birmingham Synagogue and master of the school. He continued in these capacities for eight years, and then sailed for New York City in 1849. That year, he gave a series of lectures on biblical poetry at the Brooklyn Institute, and was appointed rabbi and preacher of Manhattan's B'nai Jeshurun congregation, at the time called the Greene Street Synagogue. He continued there until 1866, his duties then being relaxed owing to his poor health. He died in New York on June 23, 1868.

== Views on slavery ==
In the years preceding the American Civil War, prominent Jewish religious leaders in the United States engaged in public debates, usually in writing, about slavery. Generally, rabbis from the Southern states supported slavery, and those from the North opposed slavery, but there were many exceptions (many Northern Jews were pro-slavery). The most notable debate was between Raphall, who endorsed slavery, and David Einhorn and Michael Heilprin, two more liberal rabbis who opposed it.

As "the dissolution of the Union [became] more and more imminent [President] Buchanan issued a proclamation...appointing January 4th, 1861, as a national fast day, on which prayers for the preservation of the Union were to be offered throughout the country." Speeches or sermons were given in many places that day. Raphall took the opportunity to deliver his views on slavery at his B'nai Jeshurun Synagogue. Raphall took as his point of departure Jonah 2:3–4, in which the city of Nineveh is saved from destruction (by God) since the residents heeded the warning of Jonah. Raphall's position was that if both sides would heed the Bible, the upcoming calamity could be avoided.

"[H]e took the square stand that Judaism sanctioned slavery and that the institution was morally right." The Tenth Commandment (Exodus 20:17) prohibits coveting your neighbor's male or female slave; Noah condemned his son Ham to slavery (Genesis 9:25); all the Patriarchs owned slaves; most fugitive slaves must be returned to their owners; the Bible contains many regulations about how slaves should be treated. "My friends, I find, and I am sorry to find, that I am delivering a pro-slavery discourse. I am no friend to slavery in the abstract, and still less friendly to the practical workings of slavery. But I stand here as a teacher in Israel; not to place before you my own feelings and opinions, but to propound to you the word of God, the Bible view of slavery.... The slave is a person...he [sic] has rights. Whereas, the heathen view of slavery which...I am sorry to say, is adopted in the South, reduces the slave to a thing, and a thing has no rights."

His discourse was published the next day on the first page of the New York Herald and the New York Evening Express; it was reported on at length in the New York Times. At "the invitation of a number of leading gentleman of this city", he repeated his talk a week later as a public lecture (tickets required), and by February 1 it was advertised for sale as a 20-page pamphlet, The Bible View of Slavery.

Einhorn and Heilprin, concerned that Raphall's position would be seen as the official policy of American Judaism, vigorously disputed his arguments, and argued that slavery – as practiced in the South – was immoral and not endorsed by Judaism.

Einhorn replied in his German-language publication Sinai, Vol. VI, 1861, p. 2-22; it was immediately published in English translation as a pamphlet, The Rev. Dr. M. J. Raphall's Bible View of Slavery, reviewed by the Rev. E. Einhorn, D.D., New York, 1861. Michael Heilprin replied in the New York Tribune, January 11, 1861.
