= Sha'are Shalom Synagogue =

Historic synagogue in Kingston, Jamaica

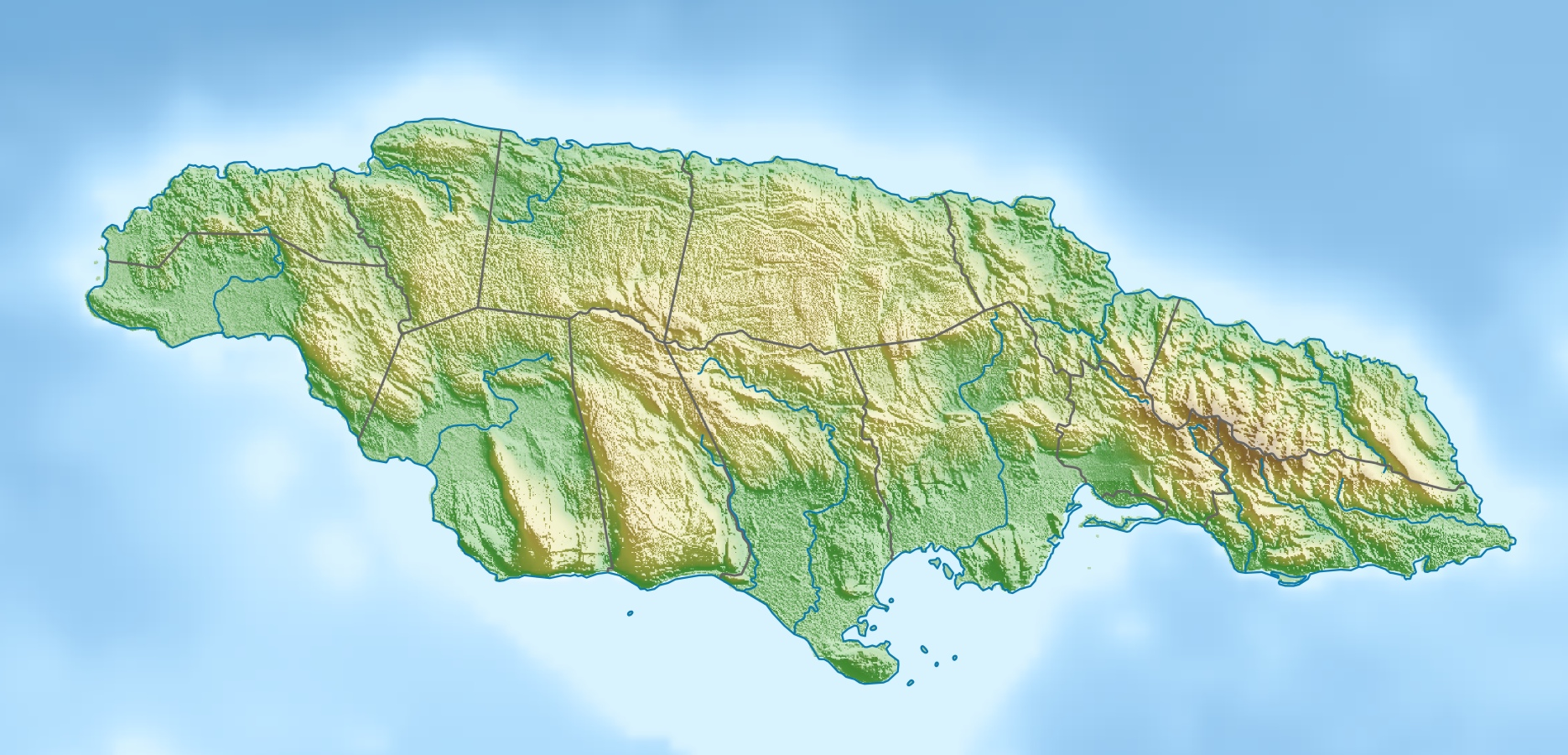
- Location of the synagogue in Jamaica

Religion
- Affiliation: Reform Judaism
- Rite: Sephardi
- Ecclesiastical or organisational status: Synagogue
- Status: Active

Location
- Location: Duke Street, Kingston
- Country: Jamaica
- Administration: United Congregation of Israelites
- Coordinates: 17°58′30″N 76°47′24″W

Architecture
- Established: c. 1880s
- Completed: 1885 (destroyed); 1912 (current structure)

Specifications
- Capacity: 600 worshippers
- Materials: Concrete block

Website
- jewsofjamaica.com

The Sha'are Shalom Synagogue, officially the Kahal Kadosh Sha'are Shalom (Holy Congregation of the Gates of Peace), also known as the United Congregation of Israelites, is a Reform Jewish congregation and synagogue, located in the city of Kingston, on the island of Jamaica.

== History ==
With the influx of Jews to Jamaica in the 17th century, multiple synagogues were constructed across the island in such cities as Montego Bay, Spanish Town, Port Royal, and Kingston. Originally, two synagogues were built in Spanish Town, the Sephardi K.K. Neveh Shalom ("Habitation of Peace") consecrated in 1704, and the Ashkenazi K.K. Mikveh Yisrael ("Hope of Israel") erected in 1796. These two congregations would later merge as Jews began to migrate from Spanish Town to Kingston, the new capital city.

As in Spanish Town, two congregations (Sephardi and Ashkenazi) existed in Kingston. Initial attempts to form a merger were unsuccessful. The United Congregation of Israelites constructed the original Sha'are Shalom synagogue in 1885, but an earthquake destroyed it. The building was reconstructed by the Henriques Brothers in 1912. This structure still stands. In 1921, the Ashkenazi community merged with the Sha'are Shalom Synagogue to form a unified congregation which continues to exist.

On 23 March 2002, Nation of Islam leader Louis Farrakhan visited Shaare Shalom, his first visit to a synagogue, in an attempt to repair his controversial relationship with the Jewish community. Farrakhan was accepted to speak at Sha'are Shalom in the native country of his father, after being rejected to appear at American synagogues, many of whom feared sending the wrong signal to the Jewish community.

The synagogue can accommodate more than 600 persons for services in its sanctuary. Its sanctuary floor is covered in sand (from the Sephardi custom) to remind persons of the time when Jews covered their floors with sand to muffle the sound of their prayers during the Spanish Inquisition. The sanctuary also features a 52-stop pipe organ. Though once an Orthodox community, the Sha'are Shalom synagogue now belongs to the Reform branch of Judaism, also incorporating prayers in both Hebrew and English.

In 2012, a Nyabinghi (a Rastafarian sect) concert was held at the synagogue as a part of the Kingston On The Edge urban arts festival.

== Adjacent facilities ==
The congregation maintains the Hillel Academy, one of the top prep schools in Jamaica. The school has a total enrollment of more than 800 students and maintains a non-denominational status. It additionally maintains a museum of Jamaican Jewish history adjacent to the synagogue. As a collector of historical Judaica from all over the island, it is considered one of the finest historical collections in the Caribbean.

== See also ==
- History of the Jews in Jamaica
- History of the Jews in Latin America and the Caribbean
- List of synagogues in Jamaica
