= B'nai Jeshurun (Manhattan) =

Synagogue in New York City

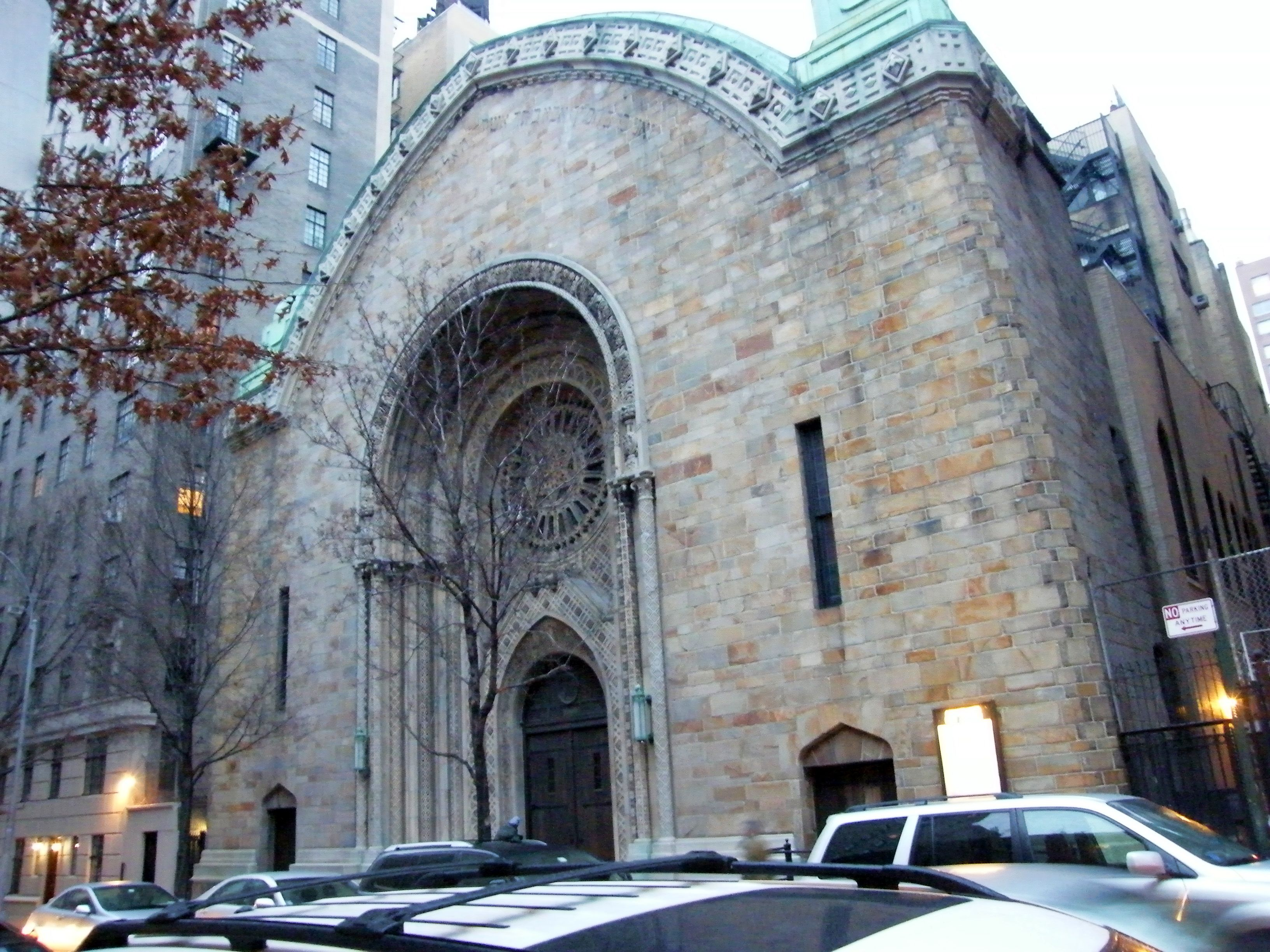
- Congregation B'nai Jeshurun, March 2009

- Location in Manhattan

Religion
- Affiliation: Judaism
- Rite: Non-denominational
- Ecclesiastical or organisational status: Synagogue
- Leadership: Rabbi Felicia Sol
- Status: Active

Location
- Location: 257 West 88th Street and 270 West 89th Street, Upper West Side, Manhattan, New York City, New York
- Country: United States
- Coordinates: 40°47′24″N 73°58′35″W

Architecture
- Architects: Rafael Guastavino (1885); Walter S. Schneider; Henry B. Herts (1917)
- Type: Synagogue
- Style: Late 19th And Early 20th Century American Movements, Semitic Revival
- Established: 1825 (as a congregation)
- Completed: 1829 (Elm Street); 1851 (Greene Street); 1864 (34th Street); 1885 (Madison Avenue); 1917 (current location)

Website
- bj.org
- Congregation B'nai Jeshurun Synagogue and Community House
- U.S. National Register of Historic Places
- New York State Register of Historic Places
- Area: 0.9 acres (0.36 ha)
- NRHP reference No.: 89000474
- NYSRHP No.: 06101.001449

Significant dates
- Added to NRHP: June 2, 1989
- Designated NYSRHP: April 27, 1989

B'nai Jeshurun is a non-denominational Jewish synagogue located at 257 West 88th Street and 270 West 89th Street, on the Upper West Side of Manhattan, New York City, New York, United States.

The synagogue building was listed on the National Register of Historic Places in June 1989.

== History ==
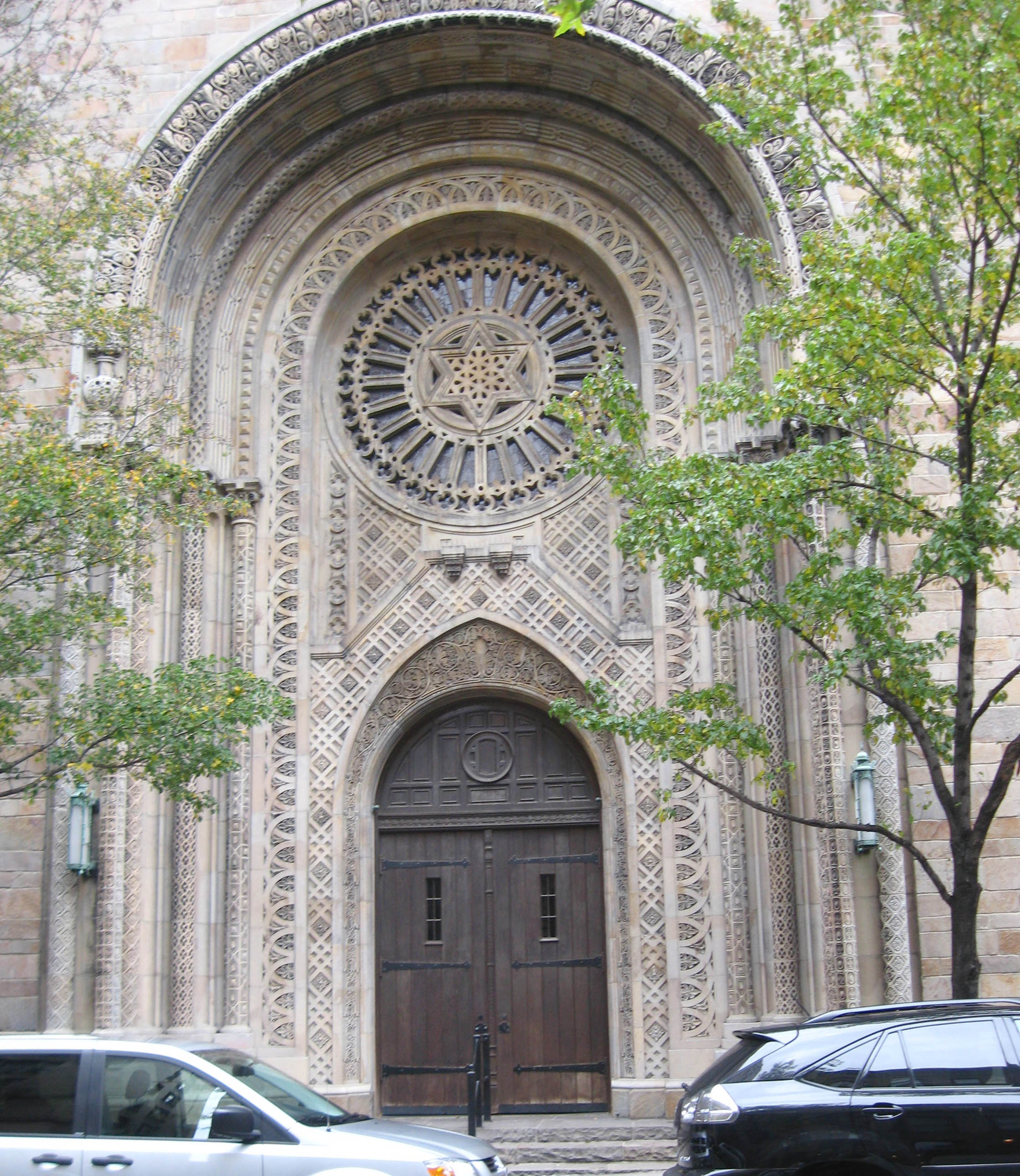
Front door

Founded in 1825, Bnai Jeshurun was the second synagogue founded in New York and the third-oldest Ashkenazi synagogue in the United States.

The synagogue was founded by a coalition of young members of Congregation Shearith Israel, immigrants, and the descendants of immigrants from the German and Polish lands. It was the stated intention to follow the "German and Polish minhag (rite)." The order of prayers followed that of the Ashkenazi Great Synagogue of London, and the congregation sought the guidance of the British chief Rabbi Solomon Hirschell on matters of ritual. They first held services on Pearl Street, and dedicated their first building on Elm Street in Manhattan in 1829.

The first rabbi, Samuel Myer Isaacs, was appointed in 1839, but a public notice from 1845 indicates that there were disagreements over who should lead B'nai Jeshurun. By 1850, the congregation had grown large enough to make it necessary to build a new synagogue. A building on Greene Street was dedicated on September 25, 1851, and the Jewish newspaper Asmonean described the edifice and its builders as admirable. Its rabbi in the 1850s and 1860s, when it was frequently called "the Greene Street Synagogue", was Morris Jacob Raphall, who delivered the famous "Bible view of slavery" discourse on January 4, 1861. By 1852, it had started a Hebrew school open to the entire city's Jews, of all varieties, and by 1854 had opened a separate school building a few doors down Greene Street.

B'nai Jeshurun had a cemetery on 32nd Street, which was in use until 1851, when the city banned burials in the area. At that time, they jointly created a cemetery named Beth Olom in Cypress Hills, Brooklyn, but continued to maintain the older cemetery. By 1875, the Manhattan cemetery was becoming derelict, and the congregation sold it to developers in 1875, moving those buried there to its new cemetery. The old location is now occupied by the back portion of the Hotel Pennsylvania, approximately where the loading dock and sports club entrance are situated.

In 1864, the congregation moved yet again, to a new building on 34th Street, the parcel later became part of the site of the flagship Macy's store. Driven by the rapid expansion of the city, they moved yet again in the spring of 1885 to Madison Avenue at 65th Street. That building was designed by Rafael Guastavino and Schwarzmann & Buchman. Less than a year later, a fire did extensive damage to the building. Reports rated the damage at $35,000. B'nai Jeshurun was temporarily relocated to Congregation Ahawath Chesed, now Central Synagogue, on Lexington Avenue, which ironically had a fire of its own within the month, leaving both congregations homeless.

Henry Jacobs was another long-serving rabbi. He had a 17-year tenure, ending in January 1893.

The present building, located at 257 West 88th Street, between Broadway and West End Avenue, was dedicated in 1917. It was designed by Henry B. Herts, a congregant and celebrated theater architect, with Walter S. Schneider. In addition to its place on the National Register of Historic Places, the synagogue was included in the New York City Riverside Drive-West End Historic District created in 1990. The muqarna-studded ceiling was redesigned following its collapse during renovations in the early 1990s and was replaced with a future-invoking space frame back-lit to simulate a nighttime sky

=== Breakaway congregations ===
B'nai Jeshurun's original founders broke from the city's only synagogue, Shearith Israel, in 1825, in order to create an Ashkenazi congregation. Subsequently, B'nai Jeshurun members broke away to form new synagogues several times.

In 1828, at a time of rapid growth in the New York Jewish community, a group left B'nai Jeshurun to found Ansche Chesed.

In 1845, Temple Shaaray Tefila was founded by 50 primarily English and Dutch Jews who had been members of B'nai Jeshurun.

=== Affiliation ===
B'nai Jeshurun took a leading role in founding the Board of Directors of American Israelites in 1859. By 1874, there were divisions within the congregation over remaining strictly Orthodox or adopting ideas from the Reform movement, and by 1875, it was in litigation, with the Reform movement ultimately winning in court. The Board of Delegates affiliated with the Reform movement's Union of American Hebrew Congregations in 1878, but in 1884 it left. Two years later, it also supported the founding of the Jewish Theological Seminary of America (JTS) in 1886, a school formed to support Orthodoxy in combating the Reform movement.

In 1870, it worked with the other traditional (non-Reform) synagogues of the city to develop a uniform siddur. In 1889, the congregation published its edition of the prayer book. These activities took place prior to the founding of the Conservative movement, and both versions of the siddur followed Orthodox practice.

When Solomon Schechter took over the Jewish Theological Seminary, he used it as a base to create a "conservative" set of reforms to traditional Judaism. B'nai Jeshurun joined his United Synagogue of America, now the United Synagogue of Conservative Judaism. In the late 1980s, the congregation left the Conservative movement and became independent.

=== Contemporary ===
A spiritual and demographic renaissance began in 1985, with the arrival of Rabbi Marshall Meyer. At the same time, the congregation introduced musical Shabbat services that drew from both Sephardic and Chassidic musical traditions.

A "Stonewall Shabbat Seder" was first held at B'nai Jeshurun in 1995. In 2018, B'nai Jeshurun announced its decision to officiate interfaith marriages if the couple promised to raise their children as Jews, exclusively.

== Notable clergy ==
- Rabbi Samuel Myer Isaacs (1839–1845)
- Rabbi Morris Jacob Raphall (1849–1866)
- Rabbi Henry Vidaver (1868–1874)
- Rabbi Henry S. Jacobs (1876–1893)
- Rabbi Stephen Samuel Wise (1893–1900)
- Rabbi Joseph Mayor Asher (1901–1907)
- Rabbi Judah Leon Magnes (1911–1912)
- Rabbi Israel Goldstein (1918–1960)
- Rabbi William Berkowitz (1950–1984)
- Rabbi Marshall Meyer (1985–1993)
- Rabbi J. Rolando "Roly" Matalon (1986–2026)
- Hazzan Ari Priven (1989–present)
- Rabbi Marcelo R. Bronstein (1995–2017)
- Rabbi Felicia Sol (2001–present)
- Rabbi Rebecca Weintraub (2020–present)

== See also ==
- Oldest synagogues in the United States
