= Abraham Lopes Cardozo =

Abraham Lopes Cardozo

Abraham Lopes Cardozo (1914–February 21, 2006) was hazzan of Congregation Shearith Israel, the historic Spanish and Portuguese synagogue in New York City.

== Biography ==
Born in Amsterdam, Netherlands, he was the great-grandson of the Chief Rabbi of the Sephardic community in Amsterdam and son of Joseph Lopes Cardozo, musician, and leader of the boy's choir of the Spanish and Portuguese Synagogue. Abraham read his first Haftarah at the age of seven in that same synagogue. He attended the Ets-Haim Seminary in Amsterdam, and became active in youth work and teaching.

In 1939 he was appointed by Queen Wilhelmina to be the rabbi of the Sephardic community in Surinam, where he met his wife Irma. He became assistant hazzan at Shearith Israel in 1946, later becoming the hazzan, and continued there for 50 years to 1986. In addition, he was a faculty member of the Yeshiva University Sephardic Studies Program, where he taught Sephardic hazzanut.

On June 7, 2000, he was invested as a Knight of the Order of Orange-Nassau by Queen Beatrix of the Netherlands.

Rabbi Cardozo died on February 21, 2006.
