= Congregation Shearith Israel =

Orthodox Jewish synagogue in Manhattan, New York

- Hebrew: קהילת שארית ישראל
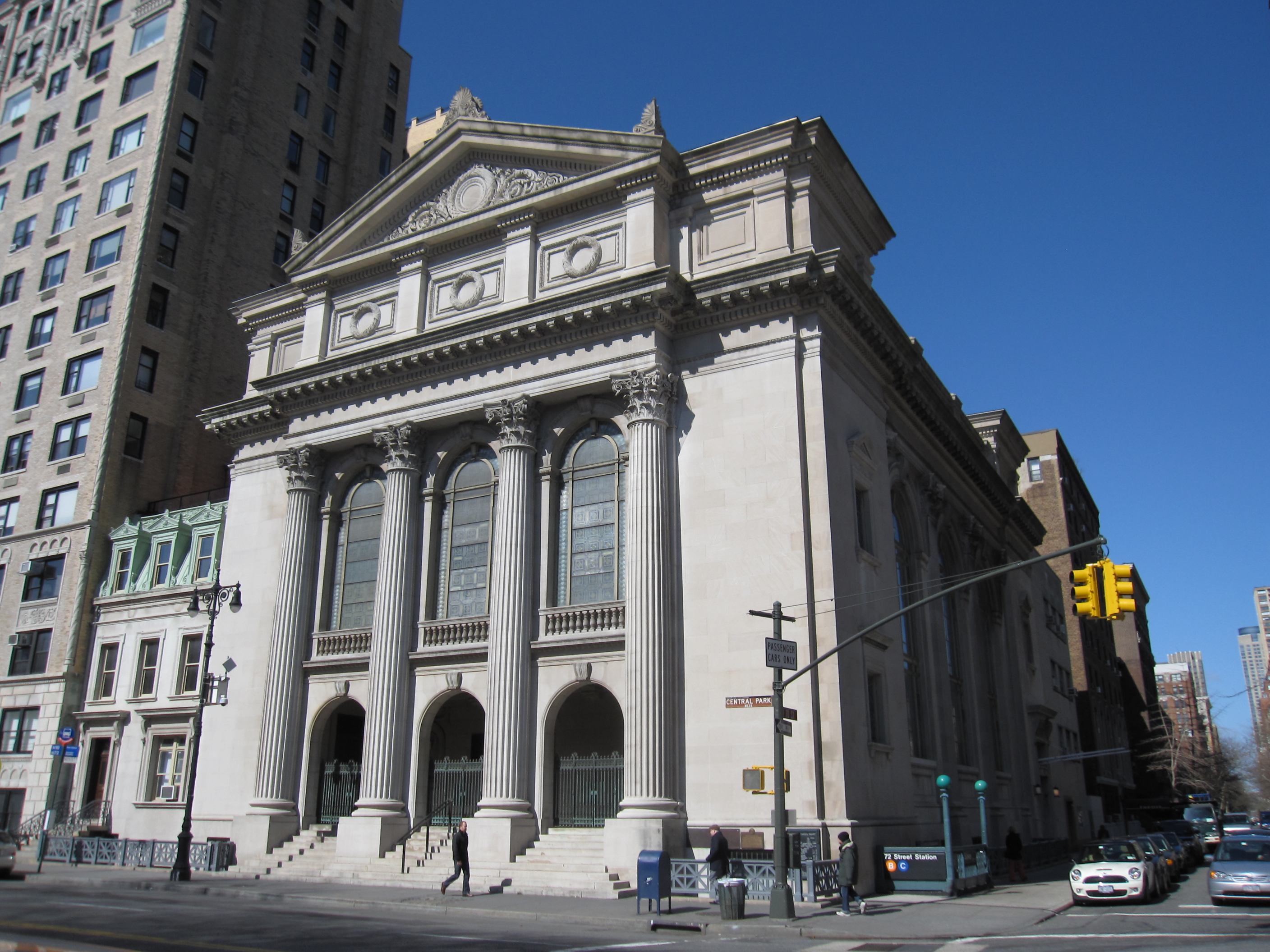
- Congregation Shearith Israel at Central Park West

- Location within Manhattan

Religion
- Affiliation: Orthodox Judaism
- Rite: Spanish and Portuguese (Western Sephardic)
- Ecclesiastical or organisational status: Synagogue
- Leadership: Rabbi Dr. Meir Soloveichik; Rabbi Dr. Marc D. Angel (Emeritus)
- Status: Active

Location
- Location: 2 West 70th Street, Upper West Side, Manhattan, New York City, New York
- Country: United States
- Coordinates: 40°46′29.5″N 73°58′38.3″W

Architecture
- Architect: Arnold Brunner
- Type: Synagogue
- Style: Neoclassical
- Established: 1654 (as a congregation)
- Completed: 1897
- Direction of façade: East

Website
- shearithisrael.org

The Congregation Shearith Israel (Hebrew: קהילת שארית ישראל, romanized: Kehilat She'arit Yisra'el, lit. 'Congregation Remnant of Israel'), often called The Spanish and Portuguese Synagogue, is an Orthodox Jewish synagogue located at 2 West 70th Street, at Central Park West, on the Upper West Side of Manhattan in New York City, New York, United States.

Established in 1654 in New Amsterdam by Jews who arrived from Dutch Brazil, it is the oldest Jewish congregation in the United States. Until 1825, when Jewish immigrants from Germany established a congregation, it was the only Jewish congregation in New York City.

The Orthodox congregation follows the Sephardic rite, and has occupied its current Neoclassical building since 1897.

== Founding and synagogue buildings ==
The first group of Spanish and Portuguese Jews were twenty-three refugees from Dutch Brazil, who arrived in New Amsterdam in September 1654. After being initially rebuffed by the Director of New Netherland, Peter Stuyvesant, Jews were given official permission to settle in the colony in 1655. This year marks the founding of the Congregation Shearith Israel. Although they were allowed to stay in New Amsterdam, they faced discrimination and were not given permission to worship in a public synagogue for some time (throughout the Dutch period and into the British). The Congregation did, however, make arrangements for a cemetery beginning in 1656.

It was not until 1730 that the Congregation was able to build a synagogue of its own; it was built on Mill Street (now South William Street) in lower Manhattan. The Mill Street synagogue was said to have had access to a nearby spring which it used as a mikveh for ritual baths. Before 1730, as noted on a 1695 map of New York, the congregation worshipped in rented quarters on Beaver Street and subsequently on Mill Street. Since 1730, the Congregation has worshipped in five synagogue buildings:

1. Mill Street, 1730
2. Mill Street rebuilt and expanded, 1818
3. 60 Crosby Street, 1834
4. 19th Street, 1860
5. West 70th Street, 1897 (present building)

The current building was extensively refurbished in 1921.

== Founding major Jewish institutions ==
As the American Reform Judaism made headway in the late 19th century, many rabbis critical of the Reform movement sought ways to strengthen traditional synagogues. Shearith Israel and its rabbi, Henry Pereira Mendes, were at the fore of these efforts. Rabbi Mendes cofounded the American Jewish Theological Seminary (JTS) in 1886 in order to train traditional rabbis. The school held its first classes at Shearith Israel. In JTS' earliest days, it taught and researched rabbinics similarly as was done in traditional yeshivas, in contrast to the Reform Hebrew Union College.

Twelve years later, in 1896, Mendes was acting president of JTS. He promoted the formation of the Union of Orthodox Jewish Congregations of America (commonly known as the OU, the Orthodox Union). This synagogue umbrella group provided an alternative to the Reform Union of American Hebrew Congregations (now the Union for Reform Judaism).

As JTS grew, it needed better financing and a full-time head. The seminary moved to its own building, and Mendes was replaced by Solomon Schechter. However, Schechter developed a less traditional approach, which became the basis for Conservative Judaism (called Masorti outside North America). Initially, there was considerable cooperation between the Orthodox and Conservative groups, but the divide became clearer over time.

Schechter formed the United Synagogue of America (now the United Synagogue of Conservative Judaism, or USCJ) to promote synagogue affiliation with his conservative ideology.

Shearith Israel remains aligned with the Orthodox tradition. It eventually repudiated its association with JTS. In a sense, Shearith Israel helped create three of the largest and most significant Jewish religious organizations in the United States: JTS, the OU, and USCJ. Shearith Israel remains a member only of the Orthodox Union.

== Synagogues ==
The Congregation Shearith Israel is the oldest Jewish congregation in the United States, and, until 1825, it was the only synagogue in New York City. Several early synagogues existed, with the earliest on Beaver Street, according to a map drawn in 1695, and, by 1700, another on Mill Street where the purpose-built Mill Street Synagogue was constructed in 1730. In 1834, the congregation moved to a synagogue on Crosby Street, and in 1860 it moved to the Nineteenth Street Synagogue. Finally, in 1897, it took its current incarnation in the Seventieth Street Synagogue, which was built by architect Arnold Brunner, with interior design and stained glass by Louis Comfort Tiffany.

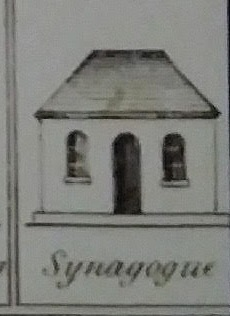
The Mill Street Synagogue, detail from the section "Religious Buildings of New York" in A Plan of the City and Environs of New York by David Grim, 1813

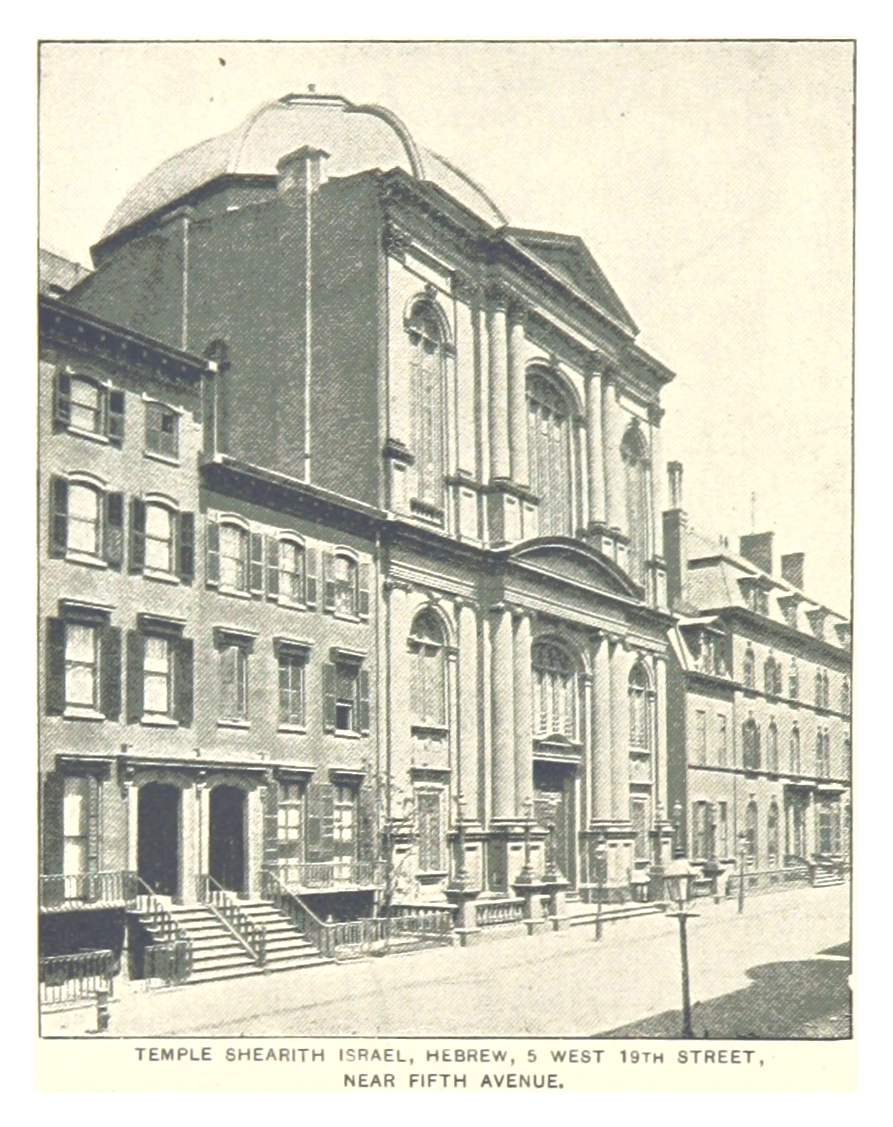
King's Handbook of New York City, Moses King, 1892, p. 410. Original held and digitised by the British Library.

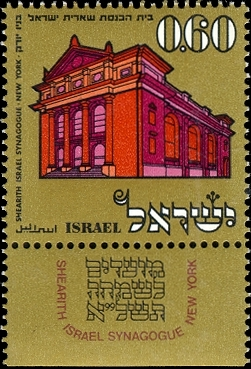
1970 Israeli stamp celebrating Congregation Shearith Israel

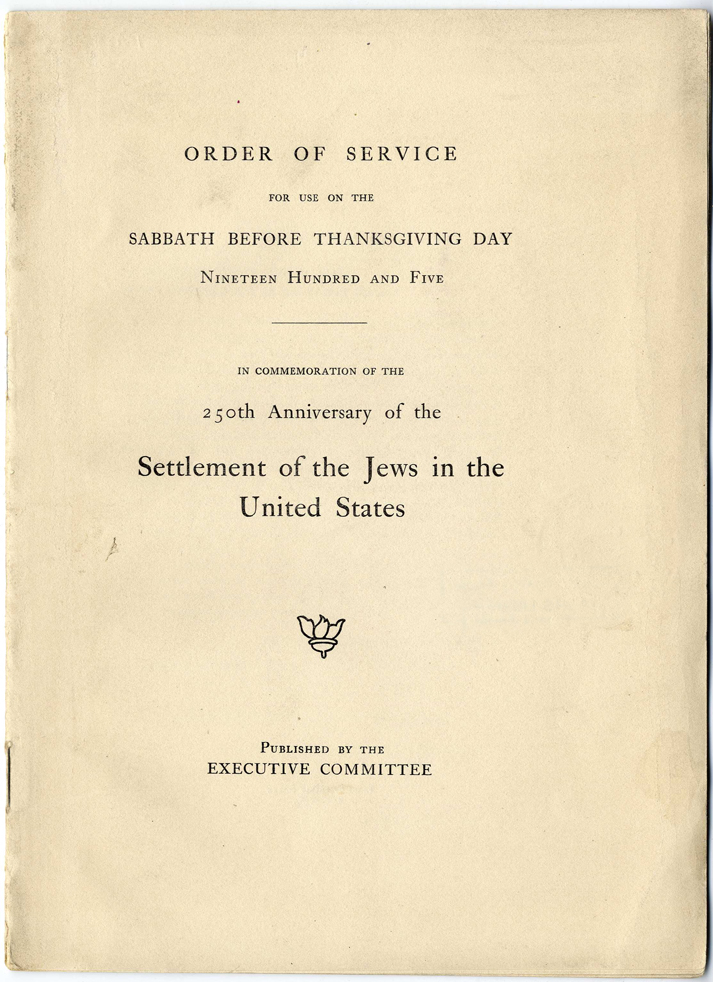
"Order of Service," published by the executive committee of Congregation Shearith Israel on Thanksgiving, 1905, commemorating the 250th anniversary of the settlement of Jews in America

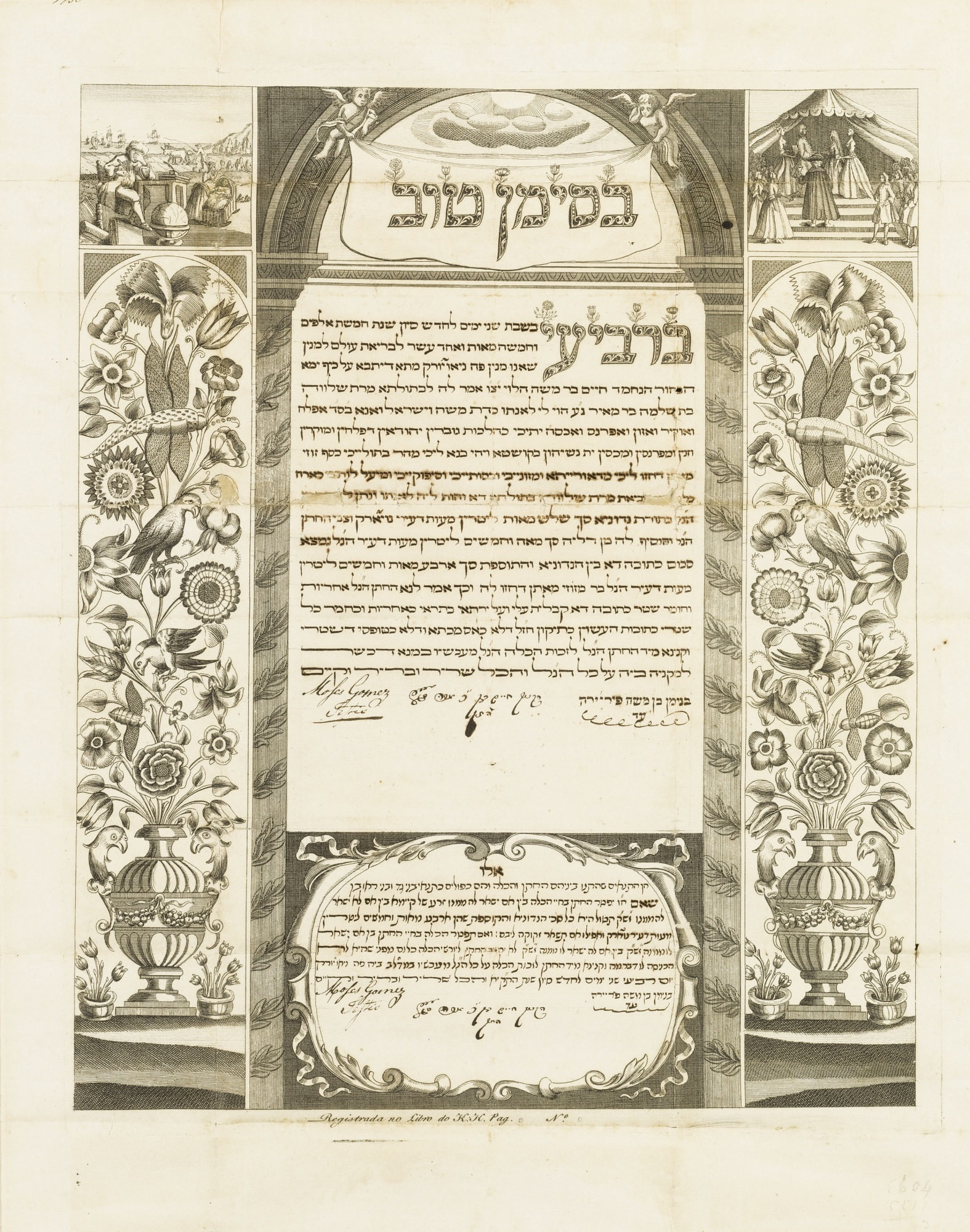
The earliest American Ketubbah (Jewish Marriage Contract), New York: 1751. The only known illustrated 18th-century American Ketubah, and one of the most significant surviving documents of early American Jewish history.

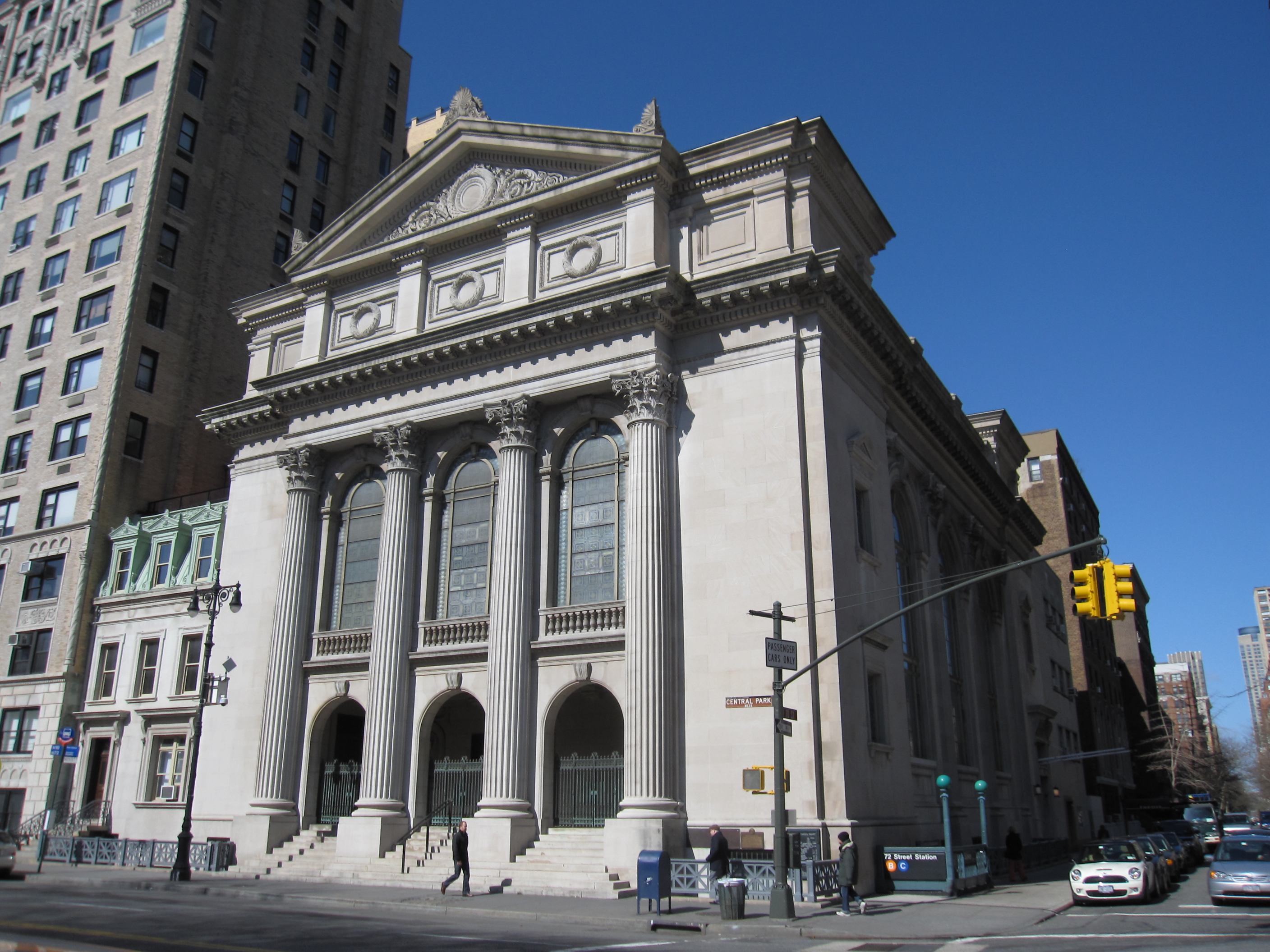
Congregation Shearith Israel today

== Historic Burial Grounds ==
The Jews first applied for the purchase of a burial ground in July 1655, and then again in February 1656, at which time it was granted. According to Oppenheim it was located at "the New Bowery [St. James Place] and Chatham Square".

There are multiple inactive landmarked cemeteries in New York City for Congregation Shearith Israel, with its only current active burial site in Queens. The first, and oldest, also known as Chatham Square Cemetery, located at 55 St. James Place in Lower Manhattan, was established in 1682, and remained active until 1828. It contains the remains of early Spanish and Portuguese Jewish settlers and American Revolutionary War veterans. A second cemetery was established on West 11th Street in 1805 and a third, on West 21st Street, in 1829.

=== 1656-1833 | First Cemetery of Congregation Shearith Israel ===
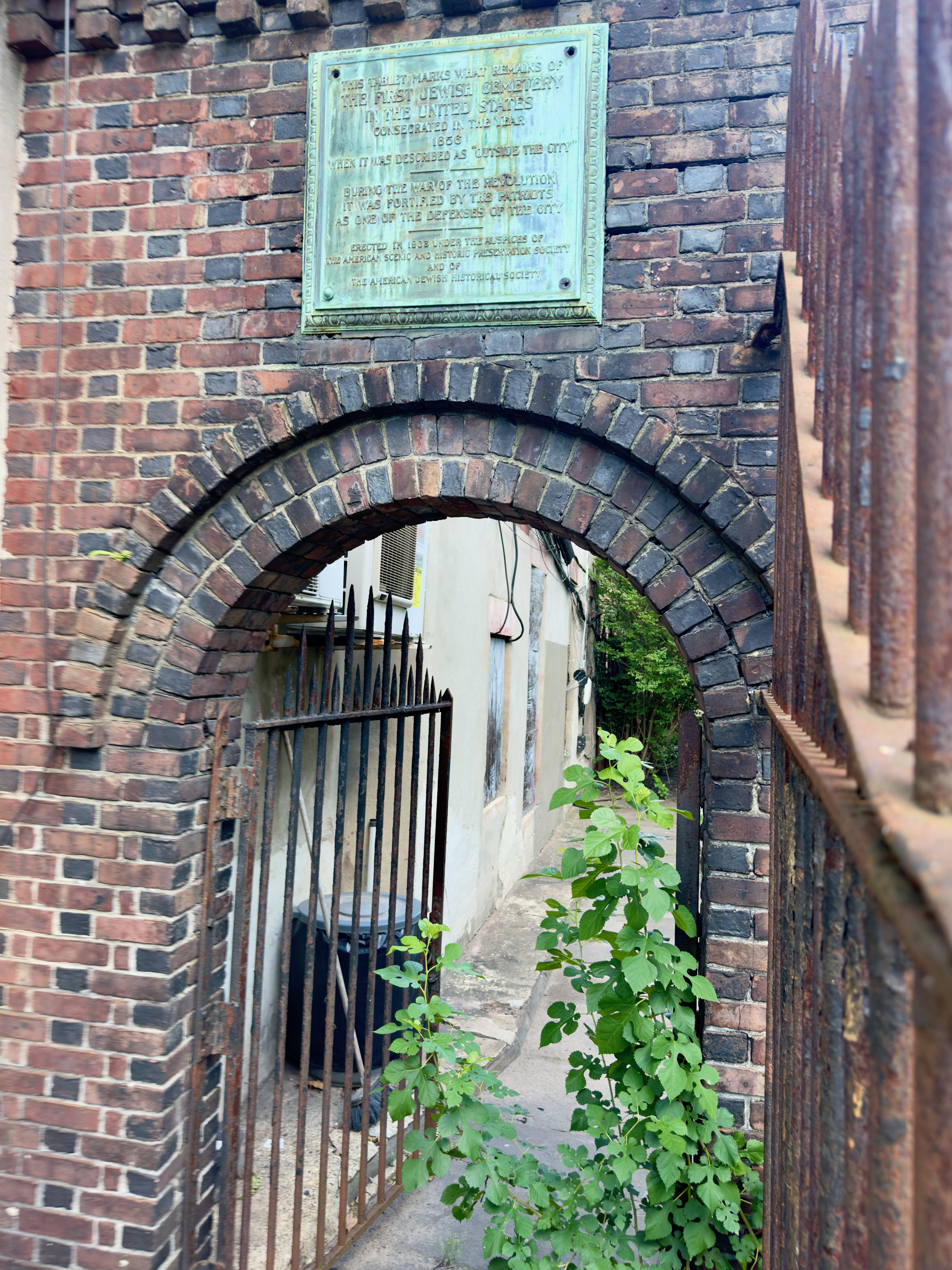
Entrance to Shearith Israel Graveyard. Gallery credit: Oleg Yunakov / CC BY-SA 4.0.

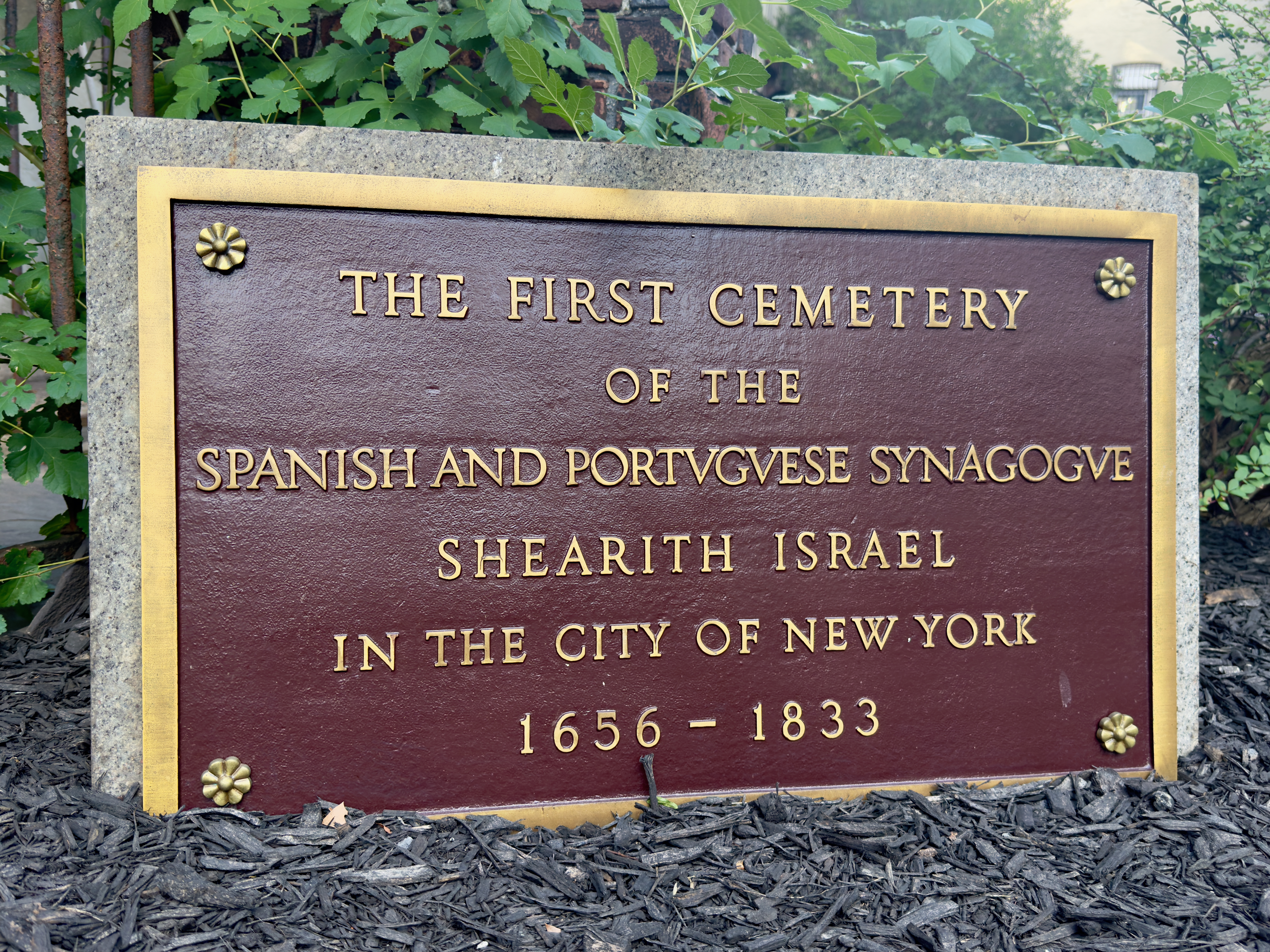
The First Cemetery of the Spanish and Portuguese synagogue Shearith Israel in the City of New York 1656–1833

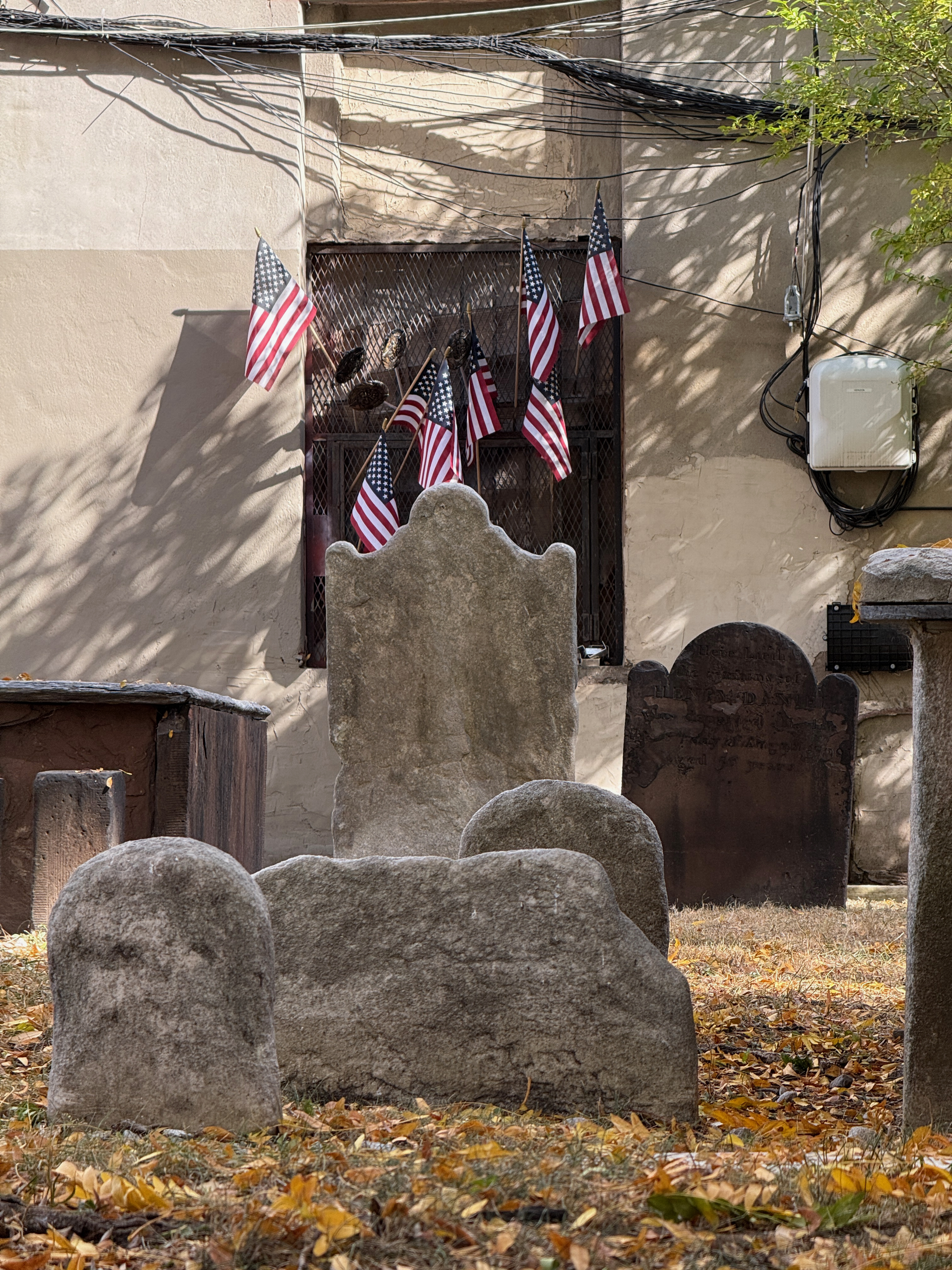
Overview of the cemetery

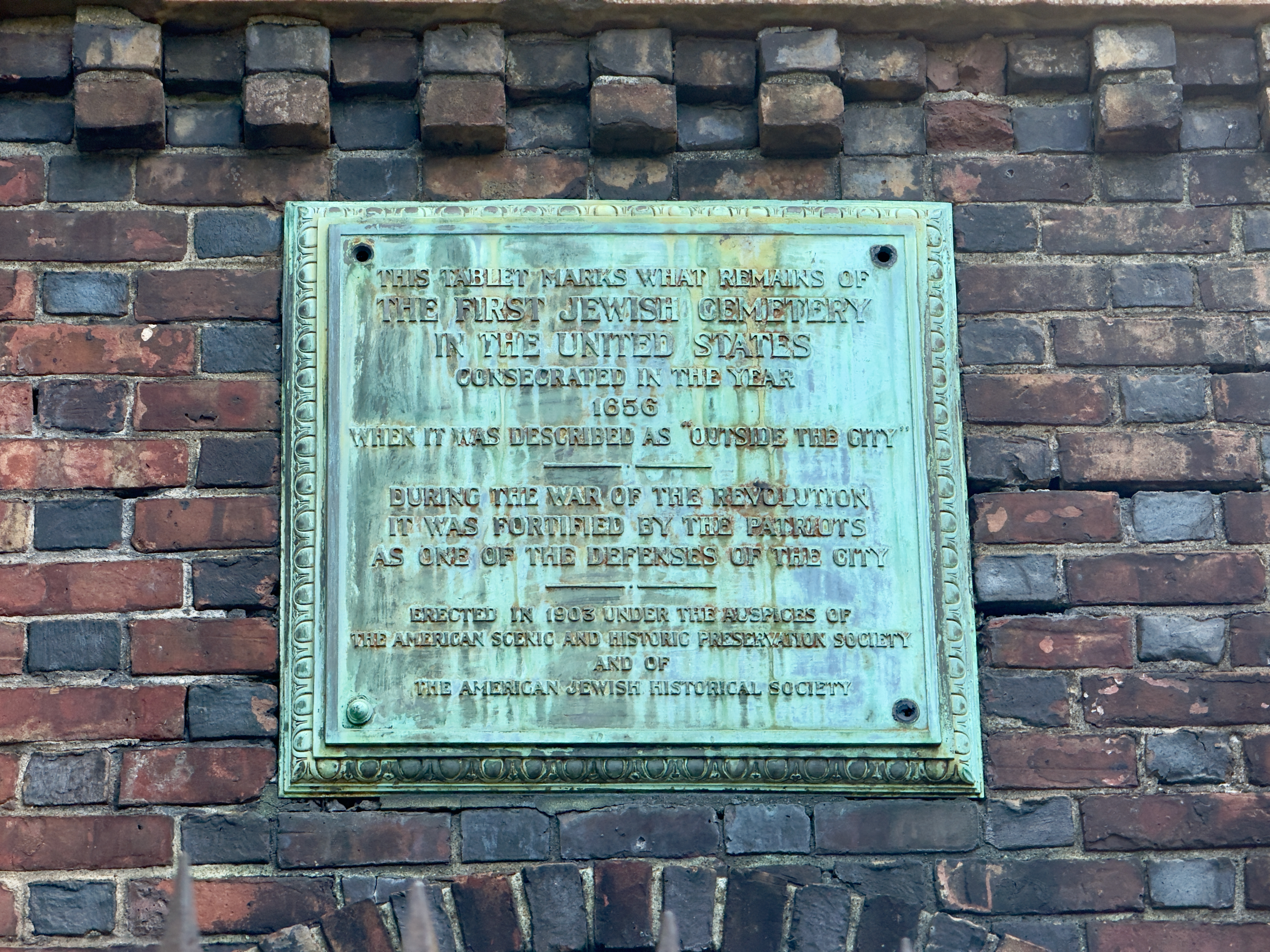
The first Jewish cemetery in the U.S., consecrated in the year 1656 when its Lower Manhattan location was "outside the city"

=== 1805-1829 | Second Cemetery of Congregation Shearith Israel ===
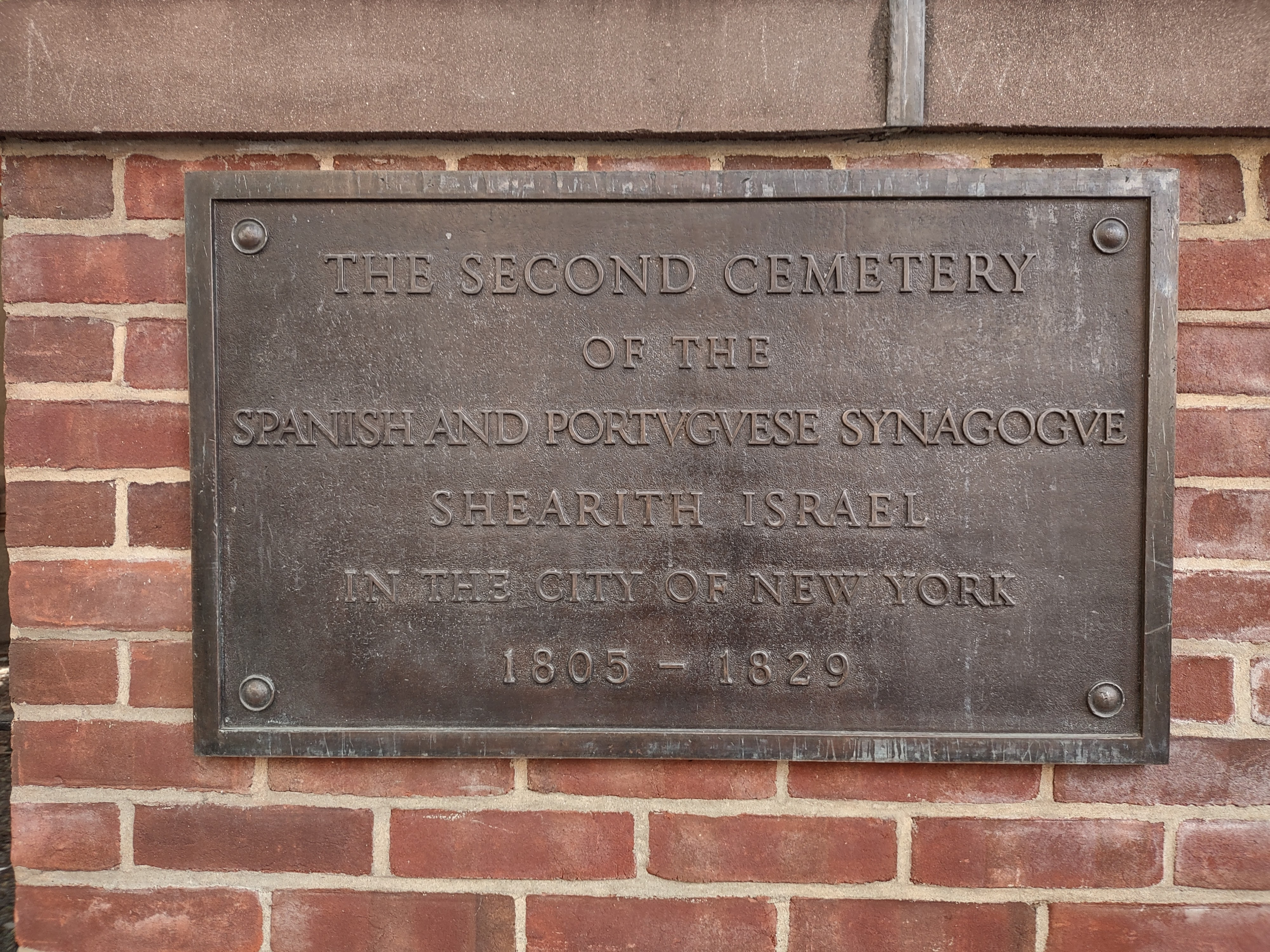
The Second Cemetery of the Spanish and Portuguese Synagogue Shearith Israel in the City of New York 1805–1829

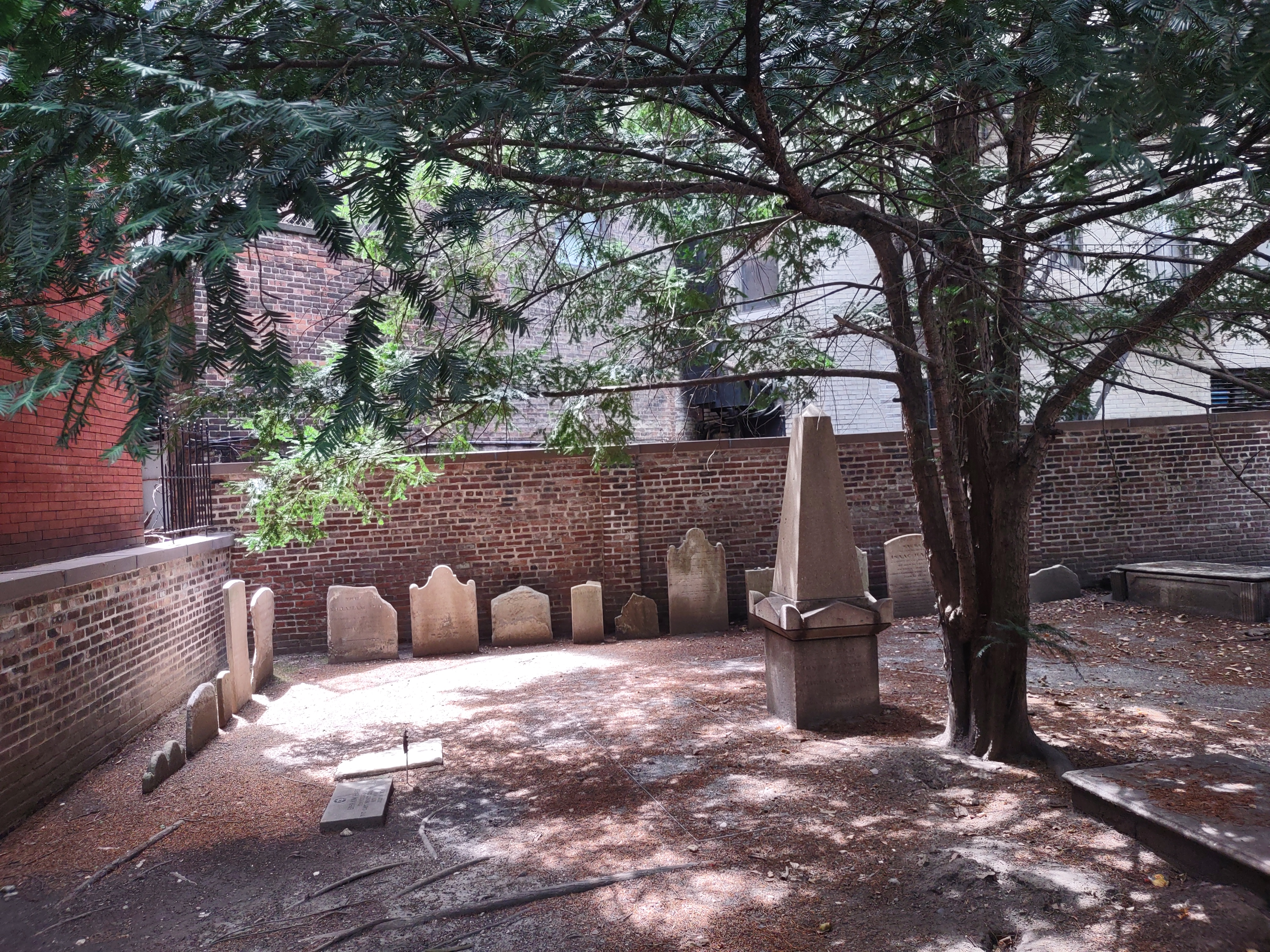
View of the Second Cemetery of Congregation Shearith Israel

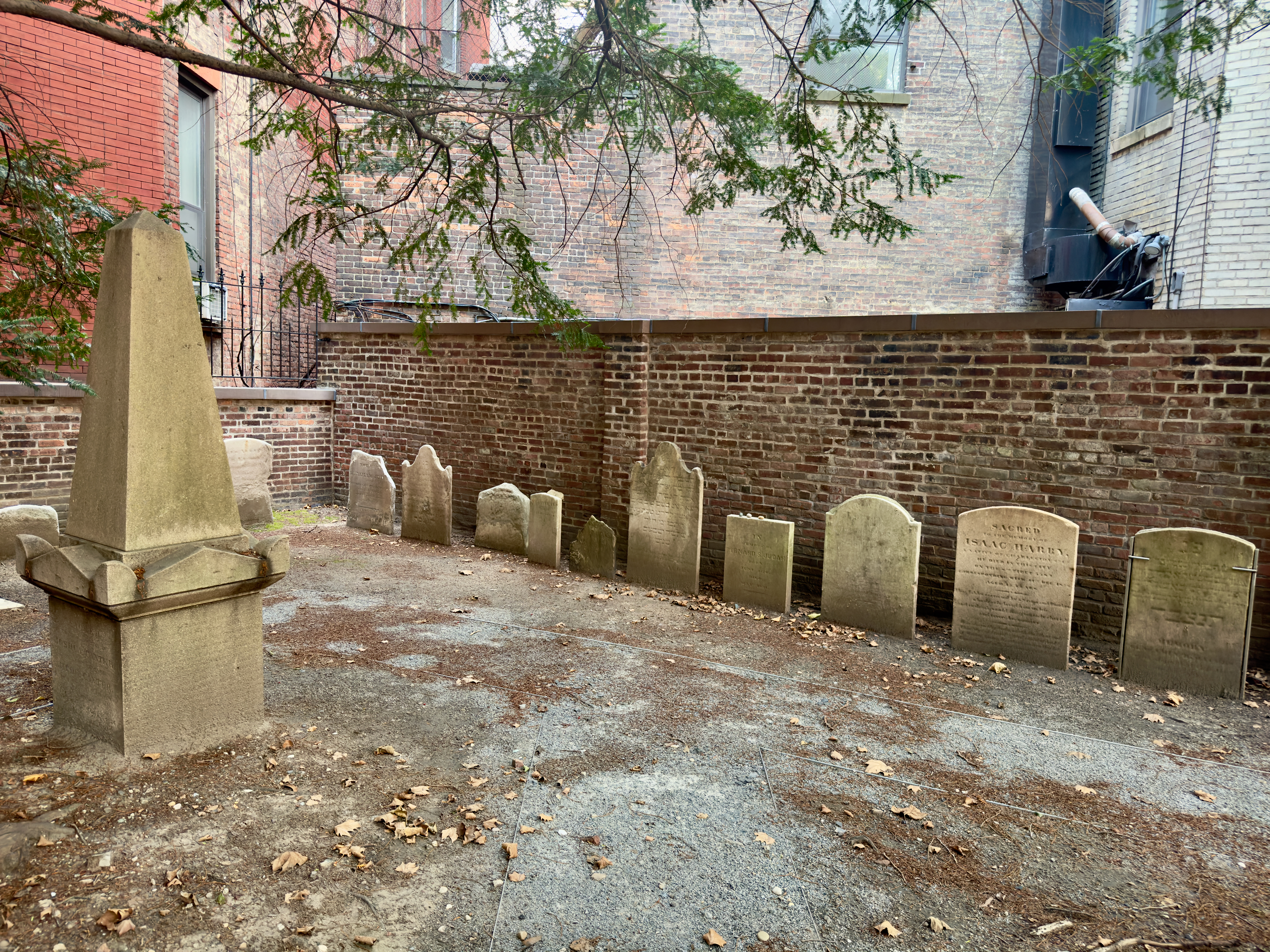
Back wall of the second cemetery. Credit: Oleg Yunakov / CC BY-SA 4.0.

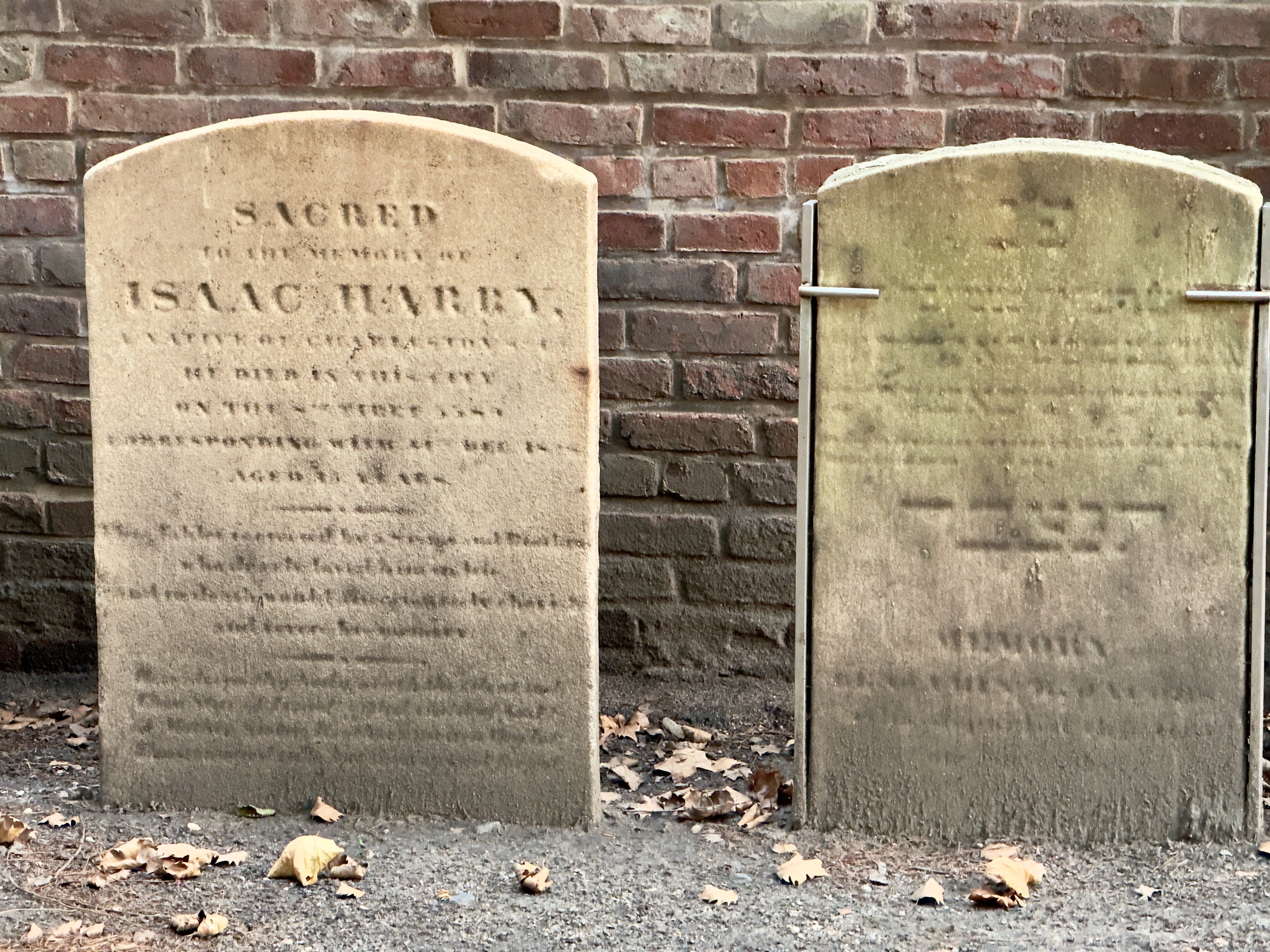
Individual gravestones in the second cemetery. Credit: Oleg Yunakov / CC BY-SA 4.0.

=== 1829-1851 | Third Cemetery of Congregation Shearith Israel ===
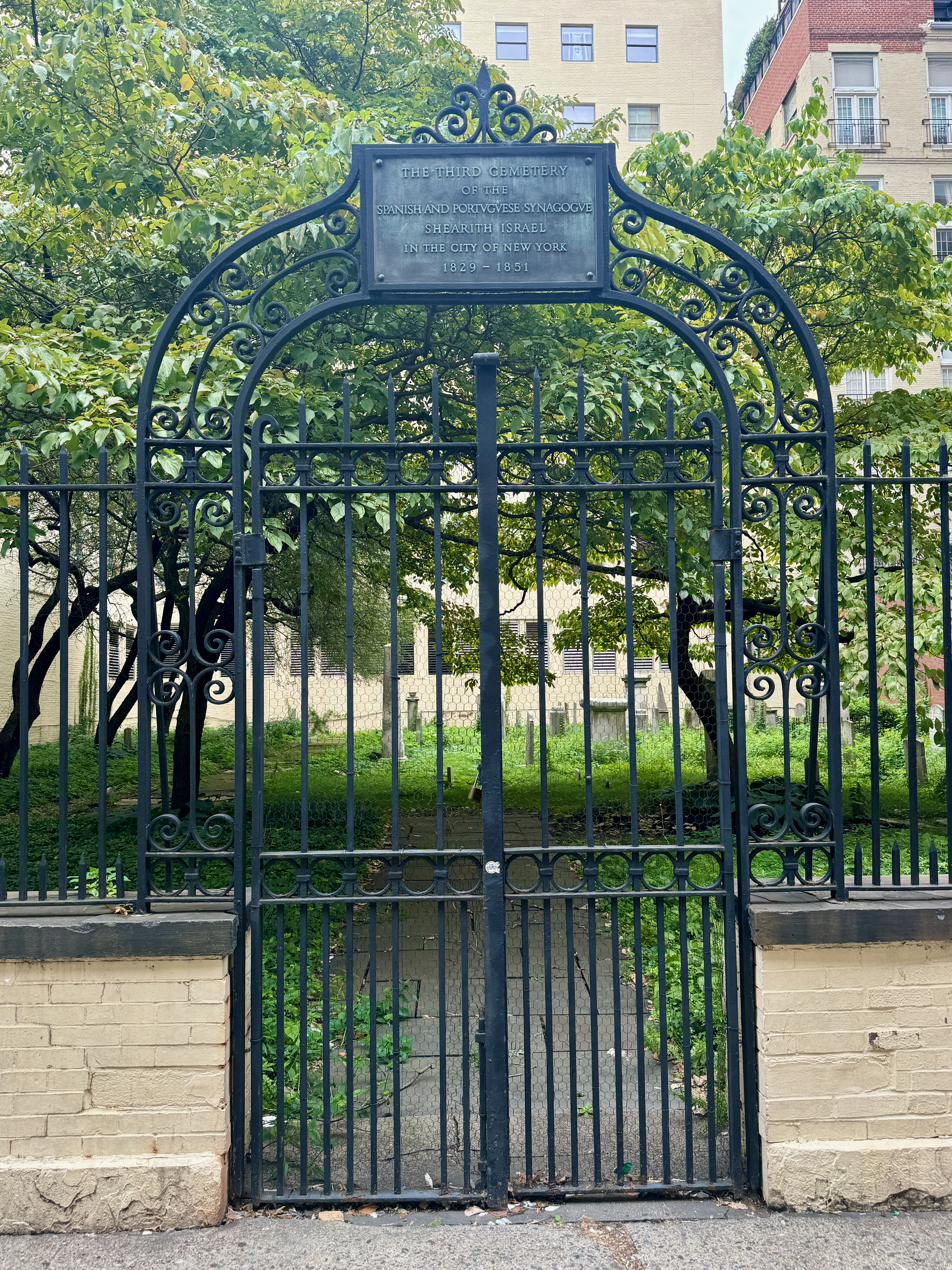
Entrance to the third cemetery. Gallery credit: Oleg Yunakov / CC BY-SA 4.0.

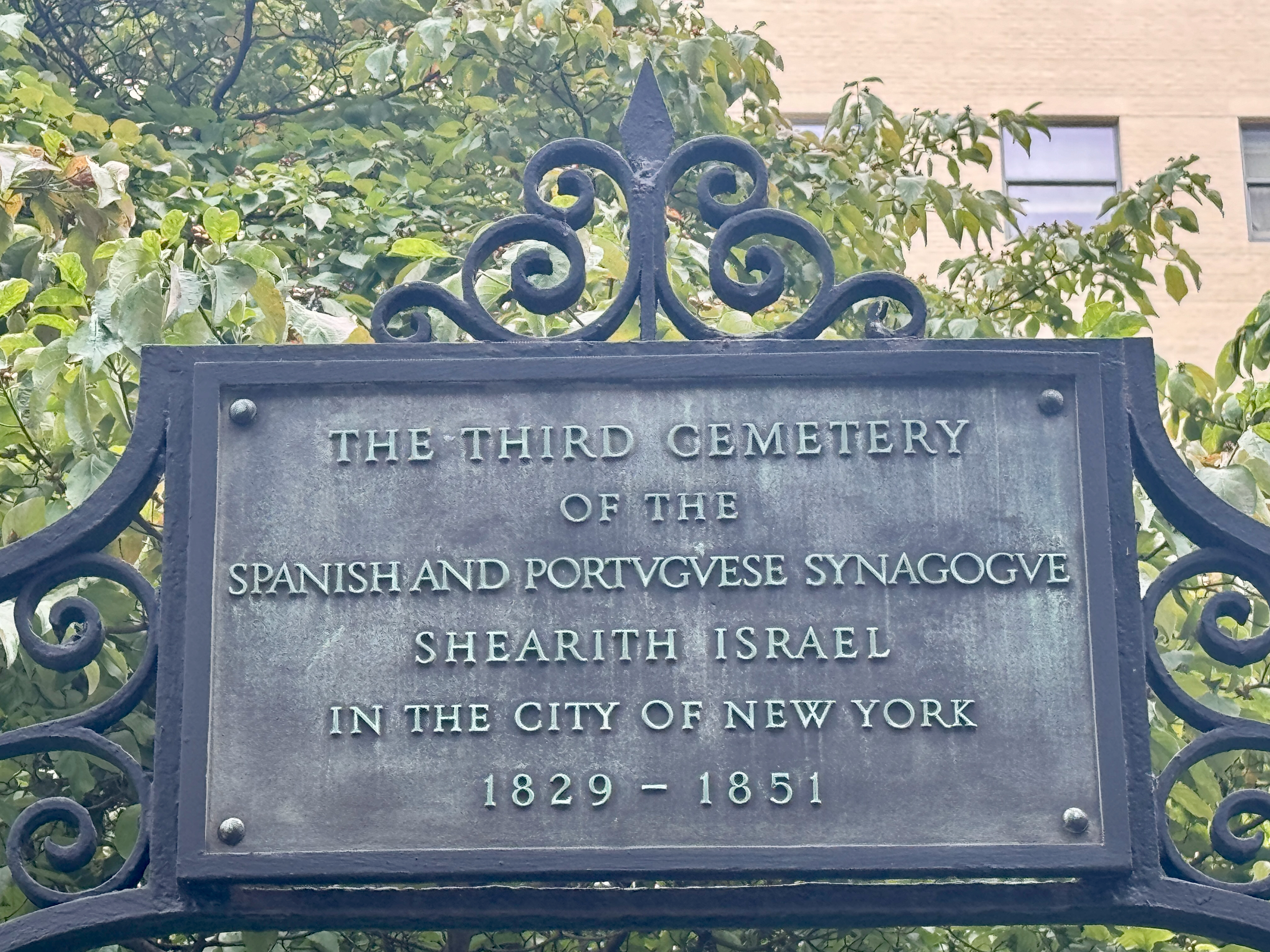
The Third Cemetery of the Spanish and Portuguese Synagogue Shearith Israel in the City of New York 1829–1851

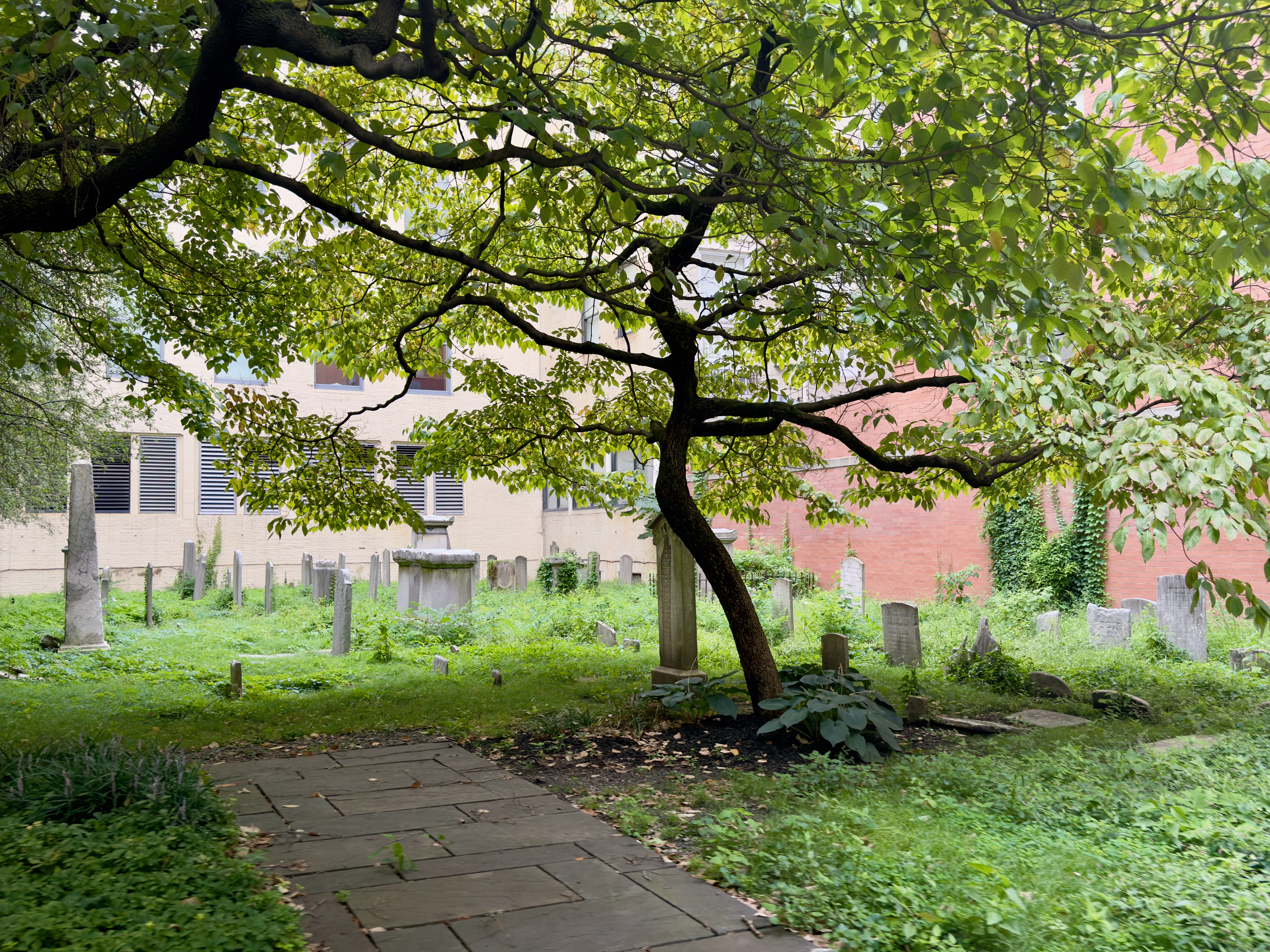
Overview of the third cemetery

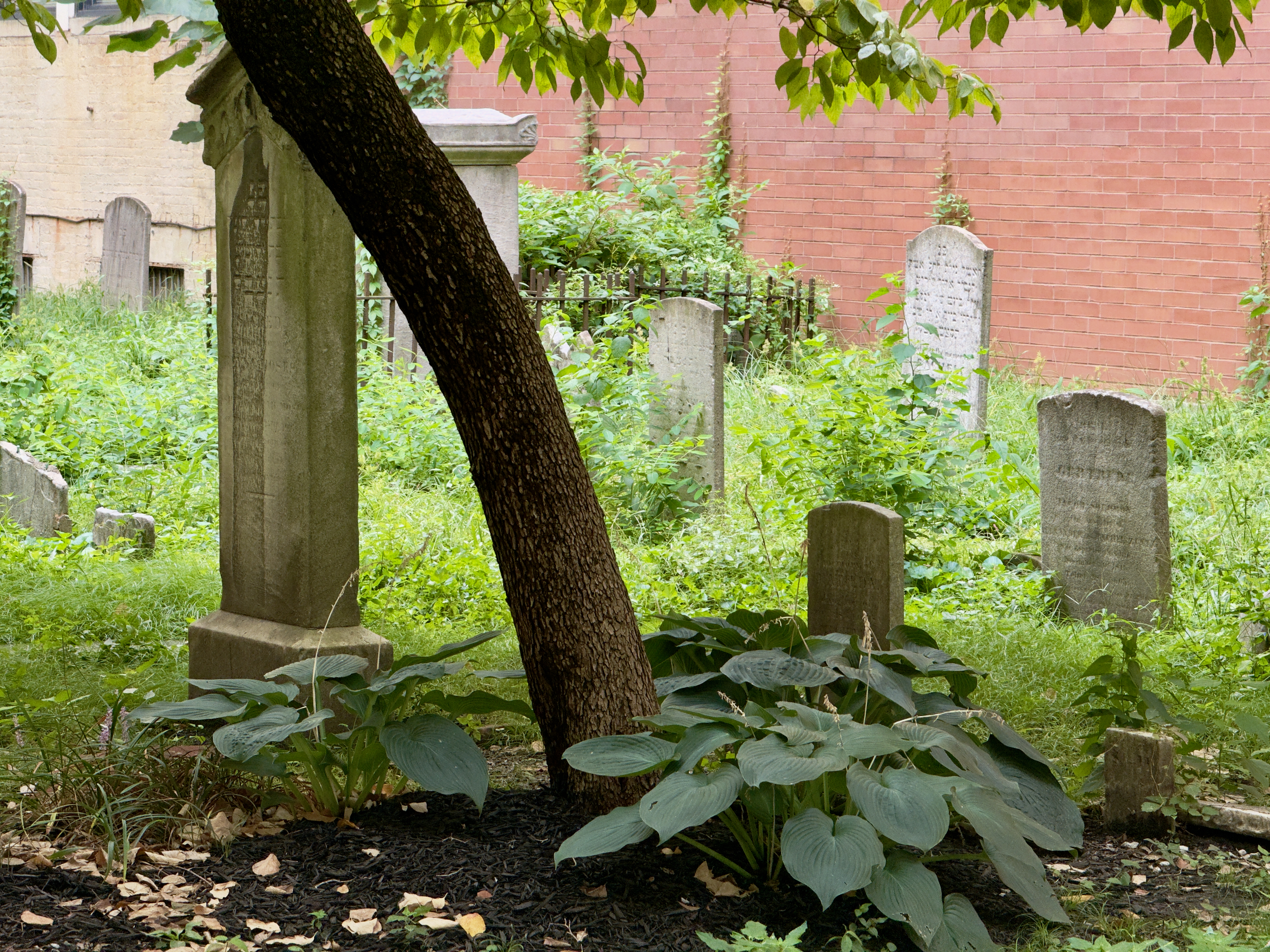
Monuments and gravestones in the third cemetery

== Clergy ==
=== Rabbis ===
The following individuals have served as rabbi of Congregation Shearith Israel:

Order	Name	Start year	End year	Notes
1	Benjamin Wolf			
2	Gershom Mendes Seixas			Not ordained: Hazzan of the Congregation and an ardent American patriot; he moved the Congregation to Philadelphia after the British occupied the city during the American Revolutionary War.
3	Moses L. M. Peixotto			Not ordained
4	Isaac B. Seixas	1828	1839	
5	Jacques Judah Lyons	1839	1877	
6	Henry S. Jacobs	1874	1876	
7	Henry Pereira Mendes	1877	1920	
8	David de Sola Pool	1907	1919	Hired as assistant rabbi in 1907, and left in 1919. A year later, Mendes retired, and the synagogue went through a succession of candidates until he returned in 1921. Herbert Goldstein was announced as rabbi, but did not actually take the pulpit. Reverend Joseph Corcos was appointed interim rabbi.
8	David de Sola Pool	1921	1955	Hired as assistant rabbi in 1907, and left in 1919. A year later, Mendes retired, and the synagogue went through a succession of candidates until he returned in 1921. Herbert Goldstein was announced as rabbi, but did not actually take the pulpit. Reverend Joseph Corcos was appointed interim rabbi.
9	Louis B. Gerstein	1956	1988	
10	Marc D. Angel	1969	2007	
11	Hayyim Angel	1995	2013	
12	Meir Soloveichik	2013	present	

=== Parnasim ===
Notable parnasim include Luis Moises Gomez, Edgar J. Nathan Jr, Israel Baer Kursheedt, and Alvin Deutsch (1997–2001).

=== Hazanim ===
Notable hazanim include Gershom Mendes Seixas (1768–1776 and 1784–1816), Isaac Touro (1780), Jacques Judah Lyons (1839–1877), Abraham Lopes Cardozo (1946–1986), Daniel Halfon (1978–1980) and Albert Gabbai (1983–1986).

== Prominent members ==
- Jacob Baiz – merchant and Central American diplomat
- Mark Blumenthal – physician, served as trustee of Shearith Israel
- Albert Cardozo – Justice of the New York Supreme Court
- Benjamin N. Cardozo – Justice of the Supreme Court of the United States, 1932–1937
- Philip J. Joachimsen – lawyer and Judge of the New York Marine Court
- Judith Kaye – Chief Judge of New York, 1993–2008
- Emma Lazarus – poet
- Commodore Uriah P. Levy – the first Jewish Commodore of the United States Navy
- Theodore W. Myers – New York City Comptroller
- Edgar J. Nathan – Manhattan Borough President and justice of the New York Supreme Court
- Selig Newman – Polish-born Hebraist and educator
- Mordecai Manuel Noah – American playwright, sheriff, diplomat, and journalist
- Isaac Pinto – prepared the first Jewish prayer book published in America, which was also the first English translation of the Siddur
- Jack Rudin – real estate developer
- Arthur Tracy – singer and actor

== Gallery ==
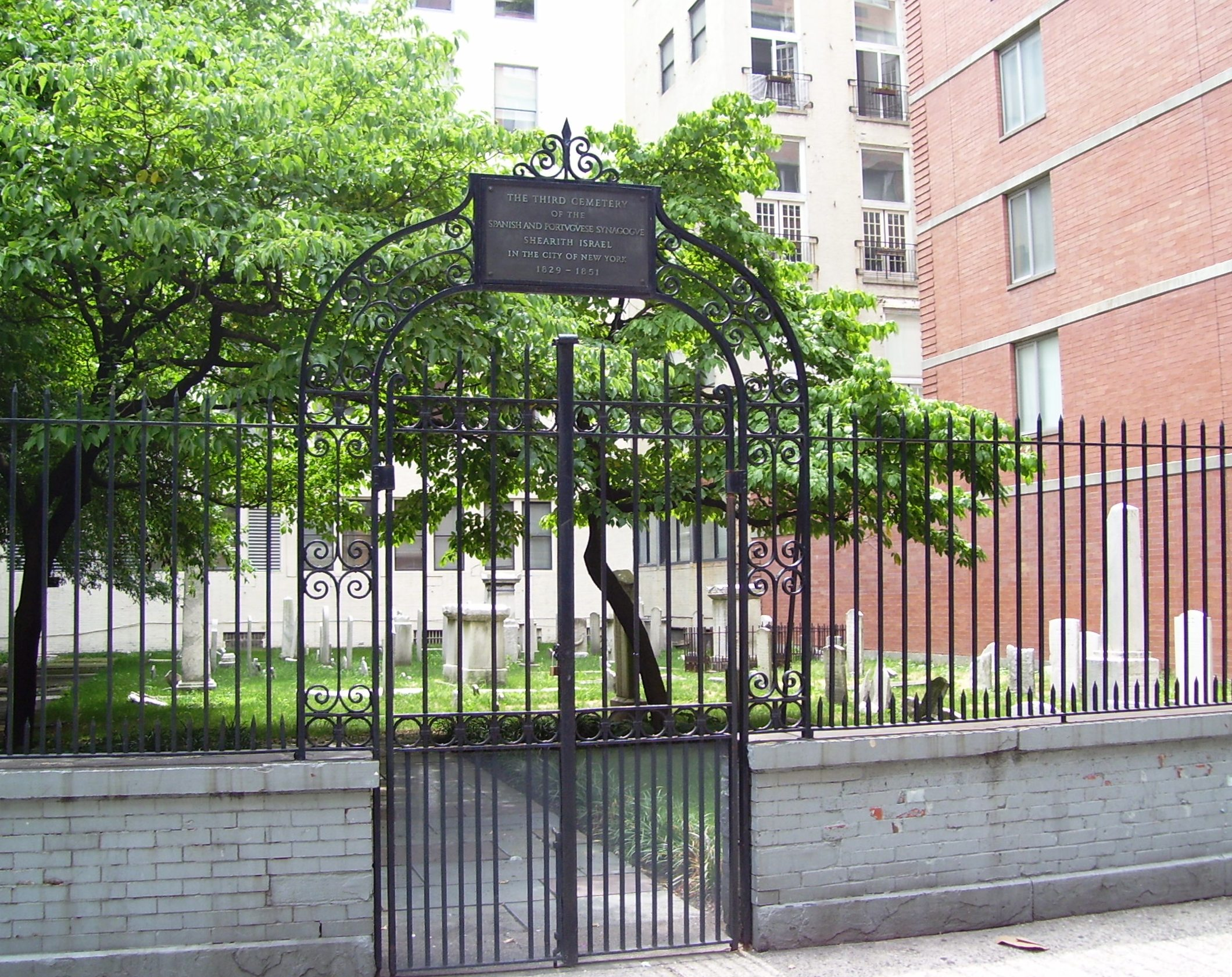
The synagogue's third cemetery (1829–1851) is on West 21st Street near the Avenue of the Americas.

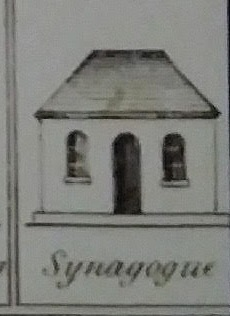
The Mill Street synagogue, detail from the section "Religious Buildings of New York" in A Plan of the City and Environs of New York by David Grim

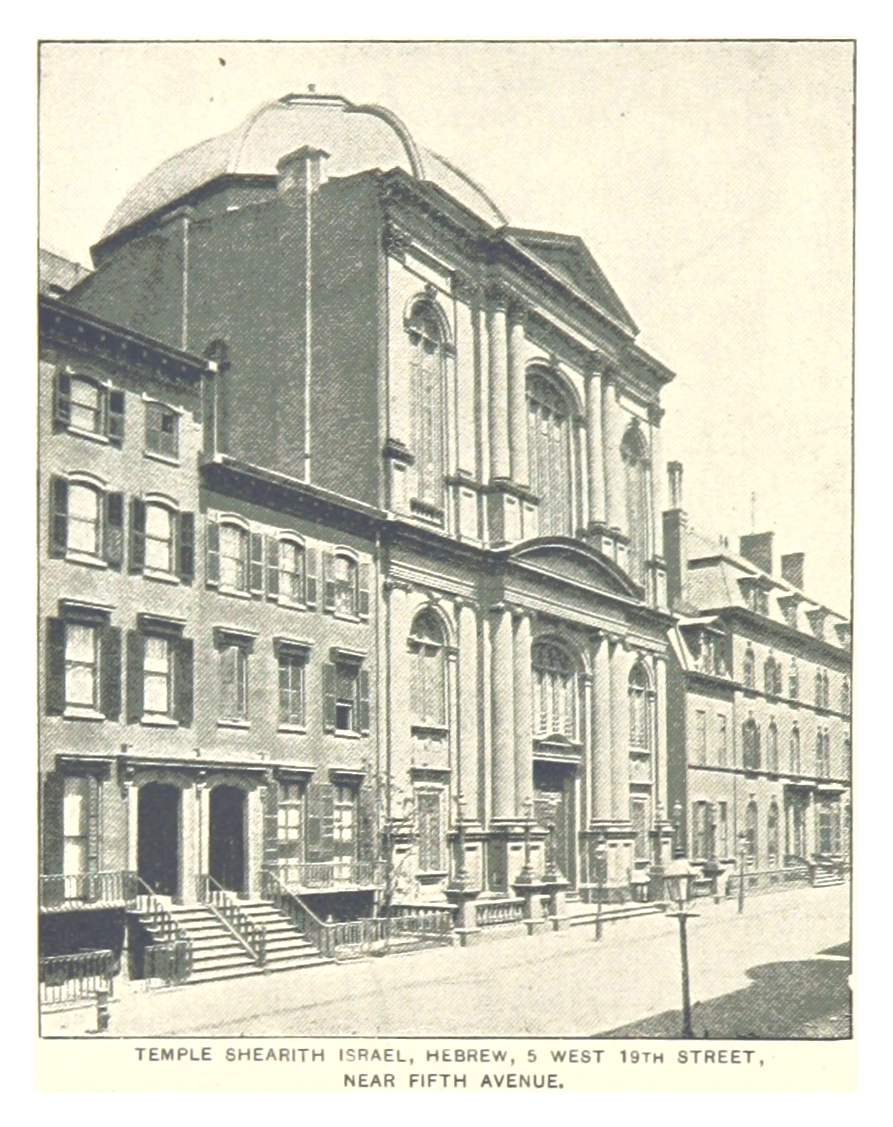
Temple Shearith Israel, 5 West 19th Street, 1893

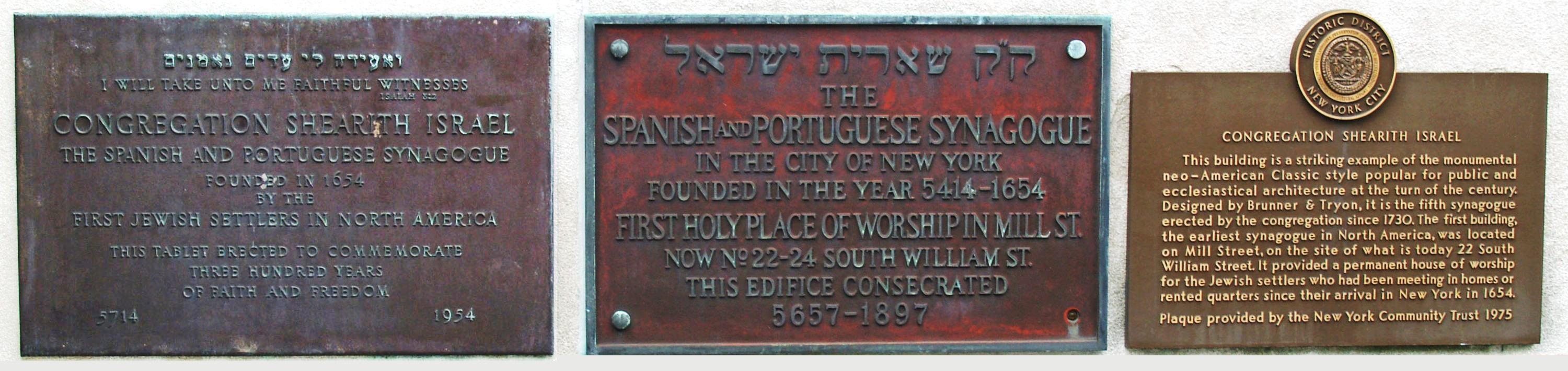
Landmark plaques

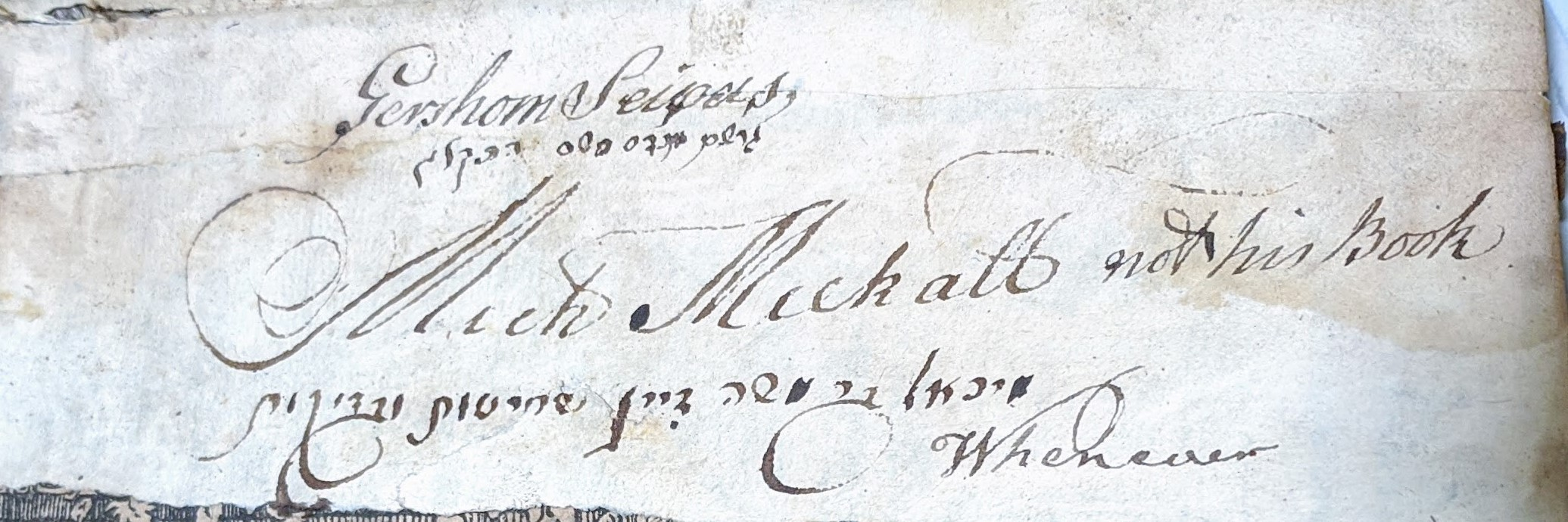
Signatures of Michael Michaels and Gershom Mendes Seixas on Shearith Israel's "Shechita book", at Penn Libraries

== See also ==
- First Shearith Israel Graveyard
- Jewish history in Colonial America
- List of New York City Designated Landmarks in Manhattan from 59th to 110th Streets
- National Register of Historic Places listings in Manhattan from 59th to 110th Streets
- Oldest synagogues in the United States
- Sephardic Jews in the United States
- Touro Synagogue
