= De Sola =

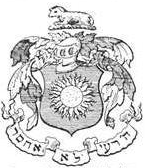
De Sola family coat of arms

De Sola is a surname. Notable people with the surname include:

- Carla DeSola (born 1937), American teacher and choreographer of liturgical dance
- David de Aaron de Sola (1796–1860), Amsterdam-born rabbi and writer
  - Abraham de Sola (1825–1882), his son, Anglo-Canadian rabbi and author
    - Meldola de Sola (1853–1918), Abraham's son, Canadian rabbi
  - Frederick de Sola Mendes, his great grandson
  - David de Sola Pool, his grandson
    - Ithiel de Sola Pool, son of David
- Pablo Vicente de Solá (1761–1826), colonial governor of Spanish Alta California
- Sasha De Sola, American ballet dancer

== See also ==
- Derek J. de Solla Price
