= David de Sola Pool =

American Sephardic rabbi (1885–1970)

Rev. Dr. David de Sola Pool דוד די סולה פול
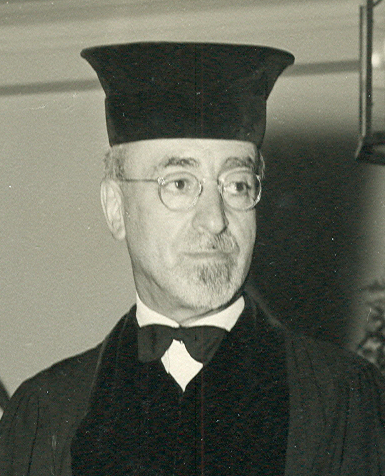
- de Sola Pool (unknown date).

Personal life
- Born: May 16, 1885 London, England, United Kingdom
- Died: December 1, 1970 (aged 85) New York City, United States
- Spouse: Tamar (née Hirschensohn) de Sola Pool
- Children: Ithiel de Sola Pool (1917–1984) Naomi de Sola Pool
- Parent(s): Eleazar Solomon Pool and Abigail Pool
- Education: Hildesheimer Rabbinical Seminary; Berlin, Germany Heidelberg University
- Occupation: Rabbi

Religious life
- Religion: Judaism

Jewish leader
- Position: Rabbi
- Synagogue: Congregation Shearith Israel; New York City, New York, United States
- Began: 1907

David de Sola Pool (Hebrew: דוד די סולה פול; 1885–1970) was a British-born American rabbi, scholar, author, and civic leader. He is considered to be the leading 20th-century Sephardic rabbi in the United States and a world leader of Judaism.

== Biography ==
=== Early life and education ===
Born in London, England, de Sola Pool was descended from an old and renowned family of rabbis and scholars, de Sola, which traces its origins to medieval Spain. His great-grandparents were Rabbi (R.) David Aaron de Sola and Rebecca Meldola, his great-great-grandfather was Haham Raphael Meldola, a prominent English rabbi. He was also related to R. Abraham de Sola, R. Henry Pereira Mendes and Frederick de Sola Mendes.

He studied at the University of London. He held a doctorate in ancient languages, summa cum laude, from the University of Heidelberg.

=== Career ===
In 1907, de Sola Pool was invited to become the assistant rabbi of Congregation Shearith Israel — often called the Spanish and Portuguese Synagogue — located in New York City, the oldest Jewish congregation in the United States. He served as its assistant rabbi, under H. Pereira Mendes, until 1919. He left to work in Mandatory Palestine, but returned to become senior rabbi in 1921, when the synagogue was unable to find a replacement for Mendes after his 1920 retirement.

In his detailed history of the congregation, An Old Faith in the New World, Pool highlighted with satisfaction its noteworthy diversity: "Probably in no other congregation in the world is there so wide an ingathering of Jews from the four corners of the earth as is to be found in Shearith Israel [...] Throughout the congregation's three centuries, its history has been marked by the integration of the elements which have come to it from the sixty or more countries of the earth. Within the compass of the congregation the motto of the country, E pluribus unum, has happy fulfillment."

On D-Day during World War II, Pool delivered these broadcast remarks in support of the brave troops fighting overseas.

He served as rabbi until 1955, and was an involved Rabbi Emeritus for the rest of his life.

=== Zionism ===
Following in the footsteps of his cousin and predecessor, H. Pereira Mendes, Pool ardently advocated for Jewish nationhood. He and his wife, Tamar, were leaders in Hadassah's Young Judaea youth movement, and Tamar went on to become National President of Hadassah, striving there to support for the Zionist cause. In 1919, Pool took leave of his position and went with his wife to Palestine to do relief work, assuming charge of post-war relief and reconstruction for the World Zionist Organization and the American Jewish Joint Distribution Committee. Pool and his wife stayed three years until before returning to his rabbinical position in New York. Then, as Nazism rose in the 1930s, Pool spoke out increasingly of the need for a Jewish homeland, calling on American Jewry to action. After Israel's founding, he and his wife Tamar were continuously active in support of the new nation.

=== Publications ===
De Sola Pool translated and edited the Sephardic prayer book for the Union of Sephardic Congregations in 1954, and the Ashkenazic prayer book for the Rabbinical Council of America. These prayerbooks are still in use in congregations around the world.

His book The Kaddish (1909, third printing 1964), based on his dissertation, remains a definitive and well-regarded work on the origins of the Kaddish prayer.

De Sola Pool wrote several important books about Jewish history in Colonial America including Portraits Etched In Stone — Early Jewish Settlers, 1682–1831 (1952) and together with his wife, Tamar de Sola Pool, An Old Faith in the New World — Portrait of Shearith Israel, 1654–1954 (1955). He co-authored with his wife, Tamar de Sola Pool, Is There An Answer: An Inquiry into Some Human Dilemmas (1966). They also co-edited the Parenzo Haggadah for Passover (1951, 1975). De Sola Pool edited the prayerbooks used for the United States Armed Forces. He also wrote a book, Why I am a Jew (1957), part of a series written by leading clerical figures, which remains a supremely well-written introduction to Judaism.

=== Honors ===
De Sola Pool held honorary degrees of Doctor of Divinity, Doctor of Hebrew Letters, Doctor of Humane Letters, and Doctor of Sacred Theology.

In 2012, the American Sephardi Federation mounted a small exhibition of de Sola Pool's correspondence.

== Other positions ==
- First President of the Union of Sephardic Congregations (1928).
- President of the New York Board of Rabbis (1916–1917).
- Member of Herbert Hoover's food conservation staff (1917).
- Field organizer and director of army camp work of the Jewish Welfare Board during World War I (1917–1918).
- U.S. representative to the Zionist Commission in Jerusalem, charged with helping to implement the Balfour Declaration (1919–1921).
- Regional director for Palestine and Syria of the Joint Distribution Committee (1920–1921).
- Founder and director (1922) of the Jewish Education Committee of New York.
- President of the Union of Sephardic Congregations from 1928.
- President of the Synagogue Council of America (1938–1940).
- Chairman of the Committee of Army and Navy Religious Activities of the National Jewish Welfare Board (1940–1947).
- Vice-president (1951–55) and President (1955–1956) of the American Jewish Historical Society.
- U.S. delegate to the NATO Atlantic Congress in London (1959).

== Family ==
His wife, Tamar de Sola Pool, was the daughter of R. Chaim Hirschensohn. She was a National President of Hadassah Women's Zionist Organization of America and a prominent leader in her own right.

His son, Ithiel de Sola Pool, was a pioneer in the development of social science and founder of the political-science department at the Massachusetts Institute of Technology.

== Bibliography ==
- de Sola Pool, David; Angel, Marc D. (editor) (1980). Rabbi David de Sola Pool — Selections from Six Decades of Sermons, Addresses, and Writings. Union of Sephardic Congregations (New York City, New York). ISBN 978-0-8148-0753-8.
- de Sola Pool, David (1909,1929, 1964). The Kaddish. Bloch Publishing (New York City, New York). OCLC 6991992.
- de Sola Pool, David (1952). Portraits Etched in Stone — Early Jewish Settlers, 1682–1831. Columbia University Press (New York City, New York). OCLC 424980.
- de Sola Pool, David; de Sola Pool, Tamar (1955). An Old Faith in the New World — Portrait of Shearith Israel, 1654–1954. Columbia University Press (New York City, New York). OCLC 1172838.
- David de Sola Pool, Why I Am A Jew (NY: Bloch Publishing) 1957, Shuly Rubin Schwartz, The Rabbi's Wife: The Rebbetzin in American Jewish Life (NY: New York University Press) 2006, and the Pool Papers, archives as cited in Schwartz.
- The Jewish Encyclopedia (1906)
- Angel, Rabbi Marc. "Rabbi Dr. David de Sola Pool: Sephardic Visionary and Activist," Conversations, the journal of the Institute for Jewish Ideas and Ideals, Issue 28. https://www.jewishideas.org/article/rabbi-dr-david-de-sola-pool-sephardic-visionary-and-activist
