= JWB =

JWB may refer to:

- National Jewish Welfare Board, Jewish organization in the United States
- John Wayne Bobbitt (born 1967), victim of a crime
- John Wilkes Booth (1838–1865), American actor and assassin who murdered Abraham Lincoln
- Jinwanbao, Chinese newspaper
