= Jacques Judah Lyons =

American rabbi

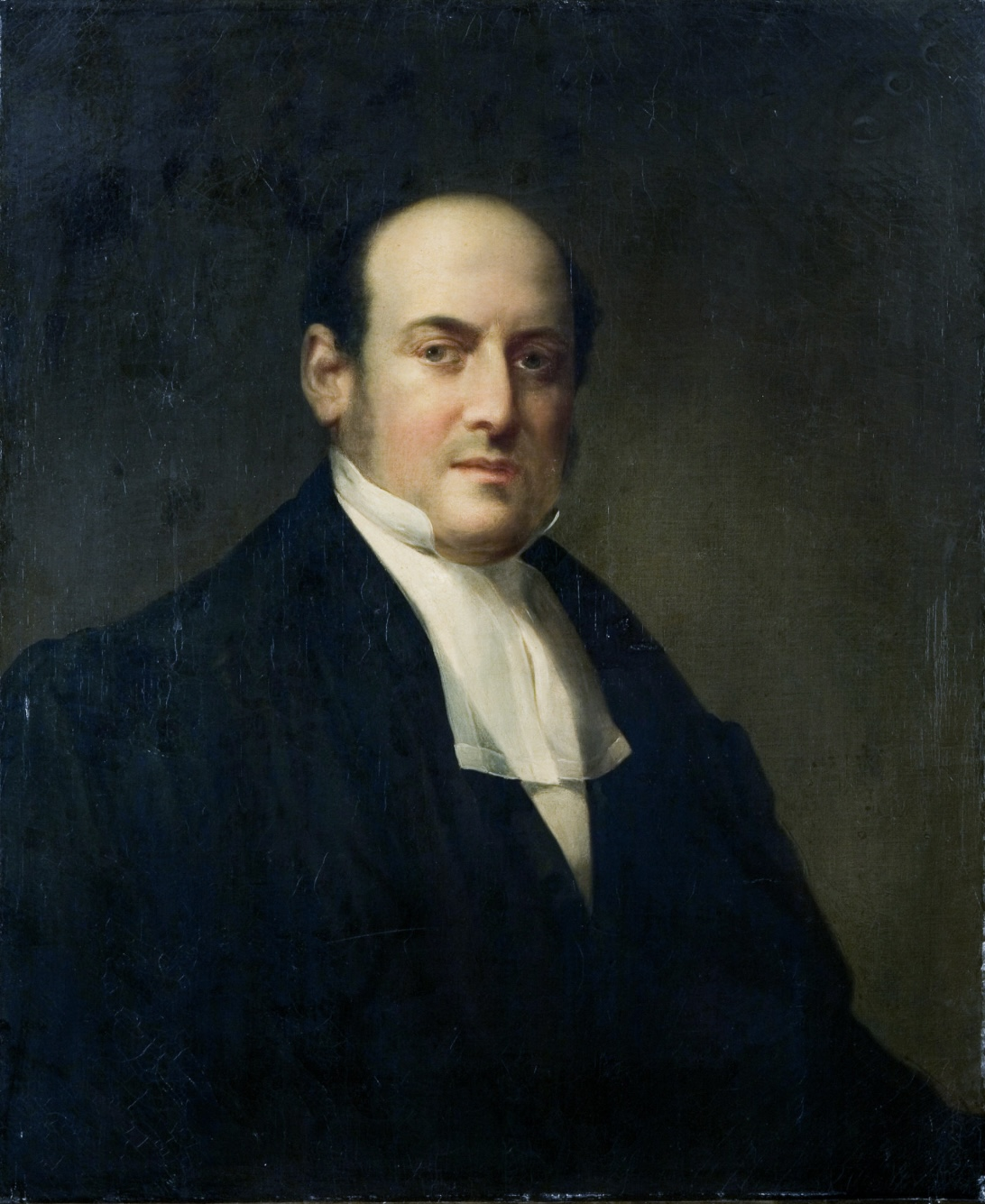
Lyons c. 1850, Born: August 25, 1814, Died: August 13, 1877, Occupation: Hazzan of Congregation Shearith Israel, Spouse: Grace Seixas Nathan, Parents: Judah Eleazar Lyons, Mary Asser Levy, Brother: Ellis Lyons

Jacques Judah Lyons (August 25, 1814 - August 13, 1877) was a Surinamese-born Spanish Portuguese Jewish American hazzan, composer, amateur historian, and man of much community service. He is famous for his long tenured hazzanut at Congregation Shearith Israel, his community service and charitable work, his self composed melodies, and his strict adherence to and support of Jewish tradition in the face of assaults upon it from movements to reform.

== Biography ==
Jacques Lyons was a son of Judah and Mary Lyons, and born in Surinam on August 25, 1814. After receiving his education there, he became the rabbi of Neveh Shalom, the Spanish and Portuguese congregation of Surinam, for five years. In 1837 moved to Richmond, Virginia, where for two years as the hazzan of Congregation Beth Shalome. In 1839 he was elected hazzan of Congregation Shearith Israel in New York City, succeeding Isaac Seixas. Lyons served the congregation until his death thirty-eight years later. He helped successfully defeat every movement to change the tradition of worship in his congregation.

== Accomplishments ==
Lyons participated in many charitable exploits. He was among those who founded The Jews' (now Mount Sinai) Hospital. He was also actively concerned in founding the Jewish Board of Delegates and Hebrew Free Schools and was superintendent of the Polonies Talmud Torah School affiliated with Shearith Israel. For many years he was president of the Hebra Hased Va-Emet and of the Sampson Simson Jewish Seminary and Scientific Institute. These works represent his larger dedication to both the Jewish tradition and its prioritizing betterment of society (acts of Hesed).

Rev. Lyons was also a scholar of both history and of Jewish practice. In his diligent study of American Jewish History (which he had hoped to one day right a book about) Lyons amassed an immense library that is now owned by the American Jewish Historical Society. In 1857, in connection with the Rabbi Dr. Abraham de Sola of Montreal, he prepared and published a Hebrew calendar covering fifty years, together with an essay on the Jewish calendar system. This calendar and its essay serve as a valuable source for information on the early Jewish communities of North America.

Lyons also contributed much to the choral and musical repertoire as hazzan of Congregation Shearith Israel. He was noted for his skill as a tenor, and also for arranging many choral pieces and introducing new melodies into the synagogue service. For example, his arrangement of Tenu Shebaha (recorded here by the Shearith Israel choir of today) is sung on the Festival of the Rejoicing of the Torah (Simhath Torah) in honor of the hatanim, the congregants chosen to read the last portion and first portion of the pentateuch. Lyons also composed a melody for Yigdal that is in use sporadically by the congregation to this day.

== Death ==
Lyons died in New York City on August 13, 1877. His funeral was conducted by Rev. Henry Pereira Mendes (Minister of Shearith Israel from 1877 until 1920), Rabbis Samuel M. Isaacs and Frederick de Sola Mendes, with Sabato Morais also helping officiate. Notably, fifty carriages with mourners accompanied his remains all the way to the cemetery -a testament to the Congregation's reverence of him.

His niece Emma Lazarus composed a poem as a tribute to his memory.

Ripe of years was he,

The priest, the good old man who wrought so well

Upon his chosen glebe. For he was one

Who at his seed-plot toiled through rain and sun.

Morn found him not as one who slumbereth,

Noon saw him faithful, and the restful night

Stole o'er him at his labors, to requite

The Just man's service with the just man's death.
