= Raphael Meldola (rabbi) =

British rabbi (1754–1828)

Haham Raphael Meldola
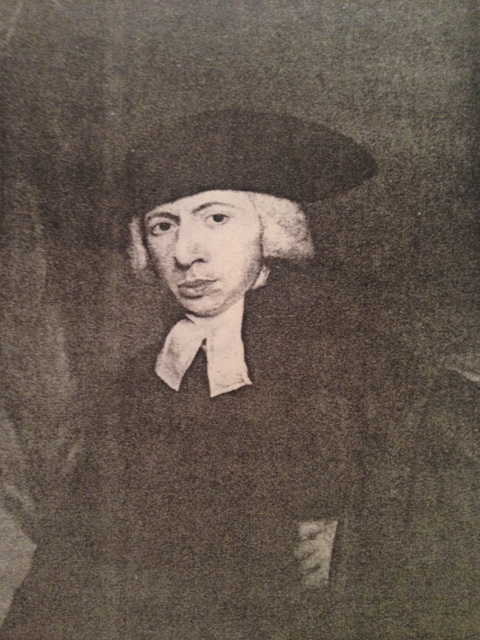
- Title: haham

Personal life
- Born: Raphael Meldola; 1754 Leghorn, Grand Duchy of Tuscany
- Died: June 1, 1828 (aged 73–74) London, England
- Spouse: Stella Bolaffi
- Children: Rebecca (Rica) de Sola, Moses Meldola, David Meldola, Lea (Luna) Meldola, Abraham Meldola, Eleazar Meldola and Samuel Meldola
- Parent: Moses Hezekiah Meldola
- Occupation: Rabbi

Religious life
- Religion: Judaism

Jewish leader
- Predecessor: Moses Cohen d'Azevedo
- Position: Rabbi
- Synagogue: Bevis Marks Synagogue; London
- Began: 1805

Raphael Meldola (1754 – 3 June 1828) was a Rabbi who served in the United Kingdom of Great Britain and Ireland. Born in Livorno, he died in London.

== Biography ==
=== Family history and education ===
Raphael Meldola was descended from an old, Sephardi family originating in the 13th century from Toledo, Spain, and numbering many rabbis and scholars through the generations. He was born in 1754 to Moses Hezekiah Meldola, a rabbi and also professor of oriental studies at the University of Paris, in Leghorn. His grandfather was a haham (senior rabbi) in Pisa.

Raphael originally worked as a printer before he received a thorough university training, both in theological and in secular studies. Over the course of his studies, he displayed such remarkable talents that when only 15 years old he was permitted to take his seat in the rabbinical college in Livorno. He received his semicha (rabbinical degree) in 1796 from Rabbi Chaim Yosef David Azulai (commonly referred to as the 'Hida'), and in 1803 became a dayan (rabbinic judge).

=== Rabbinic career ===
In 1805, Meldola was elected haham of the Spanish and Portuguese Jews of Great Britain. He arrived there following a long journey from Livorno on the eve of Rosh Hashana. In his first days, Meldola immediately and energetically embarked on a number of goals. Among them was improved collaboration and cooperation between Ashkenazi and Sephardi Jews, and he persuaded the two communities to set up a joint board for shechita (ritual slaughtering). Another area he soon took up was to counteract the activities of missionaries and the reform movement.

Meldola looked as well to ensure the dignity and proper execution of synagogue prayers—and he introduced what has become one of the most distinctive and appreciated qualities of the Spanish and Portuguese service: its choir. "As an Italian," notes one biographer, "Meldola had been fond of music and had been the first person to introduce a choir into the London synagogue."

Meldola died in London in June 1828. One of his last requests were to be buried alongside his predecessor rabbi David Nietto in the Velho Cemetery.

\Meldola was remembered as "kind-hearted man, ever ready to lend a willing ear to tales of distress and to do his utmost to procure assistance." His name will ever be associated with that of Bevis Marks Synagogue.

== Publications ==
Possessed of a remarkably virile mind, Meldola was a dominant factor in the British Jewry of his generation.

Meldola was the author of Qorban Minhah (1791) on the duties of the High Priest; Chuppat Chatanim (1797), an instruction manual to bridegrooms; and Derekh Emunah, published by his son after his death. He left 10 manuscript works, including an exposition of Jewish doctrine, rites, and beliefs.

Meldola's scholarship attracted a circle that included some of the great men of his day, among them Benjamin Disraeli and Isaac D'Israeli; and it is noteworthy that he opposed the policy which produced the famous rupture between the latter and the mahamad. He also maintained a correspondence with many of the most prominent Christian clergymen and scholars of his time; and his acquaintance with the Archbishop of Canterbury and the Canon of Windsor led to his being received by King George III.

== Family life ==
Meldola married Stella Bollaffi (Abulafia), with whom he had four sons and four daughters. One daughter, Rica, married Hazan David Aaron de Sola who would later succeed Meldola at Bevis Marks.

Other descendants include Rabbi Abraham de Sola of the Spanish & Portuguese Synagogue in Montreal; Rabbi Abraham Pereira Mendes, minister of Touro Synagogue in Newport, Rhode Island; Rabbi Henry Pereira Mendes, minister of Congregation Shearith Israel in New York; Rabbi Frederick de Sola Mendes, minister at the West End Synagogue; Rabbi David de Sola Pool, also a minister at Shearith Israel; and the chemist Raphael Meldola.
