= Solla (disambiguation) =

Solla is a village in Togo. "Solla" may also refer to:

- De Solla, a surname
- Sara Solla, Argentine-American physicist
- Solla Stirða, the Icelandic name of fictional character Stephanie in children's TV show LazyTown
- Soraya Santiago Solla (1947–2020), Puerto Rican transgender pioneer
