= Abraham de Sola =

Canadian rabbi (1825–1882)

Rev. Dr. Abraham de Sola
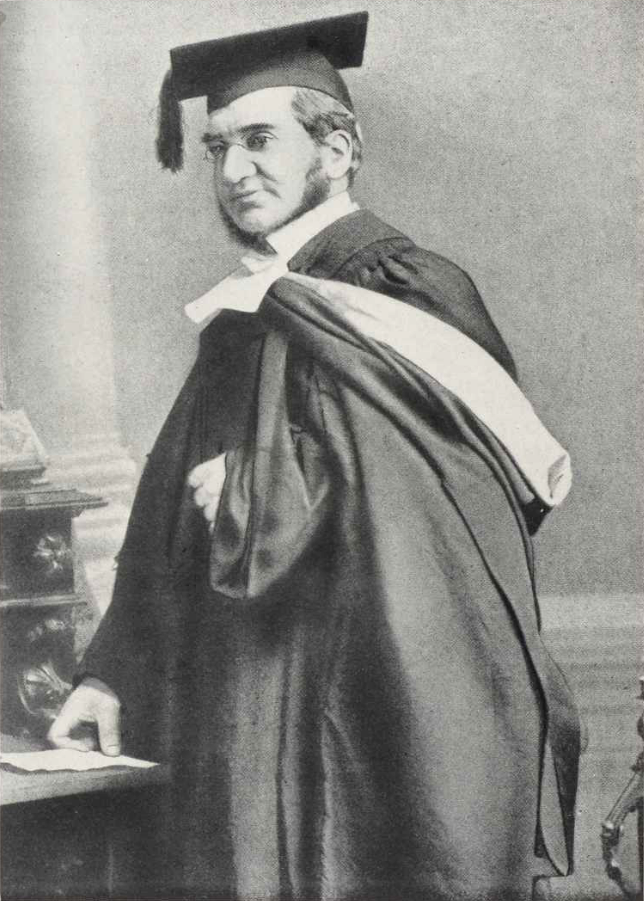

Personal life
- Born: September 18, 1825 London, England
- Died: June 5, 1882 (aged 56) New York City, New York
- Buried: Montreal, Quebec
- Spouse: Esther Joseph (m. 1852)
- Children: Rev. Meldola de Sola; Clarence de Sola
- Parent(s): David Aaron de Sola and Rebecca Meldola

Religious life
- Religion: Judaism
- Denomination: Orthodox Judaism

Jewish leader
- Successor: Meldola de Sola
- Synagogue: Congregation Shearith Israel
- Position: Rabbi
- Began: 1846
- Ended: 1882

Abraham de Sola (Hebrew: אברהם דה סולה; September 18, 1825 – June 5, 1882) was a Canadian rabbi, author, Orientalist, and academic. Originating from a large renowned family of rabbis and scholars, De Sola was recognized as one of the foremost leaders of Orthodox Judaism in North America during the latter half of the nineteenth century.

== Early life and education ==
Born in London, England, the sixth child of David Aaron de Sola and Rebecca Meldola. His maternal grandfather was ḥakham Raphael Meldola, a prominent English rabbi. His sister Eliza married Rabbi Abraham Pereira Mendes and was the mother of Rabbis Frederick de Sola Mendes and Henry Pereira Mendes.

In 1846, De Sola was elected minister of the Congregation Shearith Israel of Montreal, where he arrived in early 1847. De Sola was appointed lecturer (1848) and then professor (1853) of Hebrew and Oriental literature at McGill University, and eventually became the senior professor of its Faculty of Arts. He was president of the Natural History Society for several years, and addressed its members frequently on academic subjects. The degree of LL.D. was conferred upon him by McGill in 1858—the first instance of a Jew attaining this honour in an English-speaking country.

== Later career ==
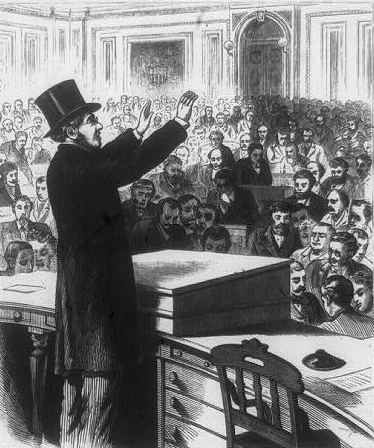
Abraham de Sola delivering the opening prayer at the House of Representatives on Tuesday, January 9, 1872

In 1872, by invitation of President Ulysses S. Grant's administration, De Sola delivered the opening prayer for the United States Congress. The event was of significance, as De Sola was a British subject, and this was the first indication of a more friendly feeling between the United States and Great Britain after the dangerously strained relations that had been caused by the recently adjusted Alabama Claims. William Ewart Gladstone, then British Prime Minister, as well as Sir Edward Thornton, the British ambassador at Washington, extended the thanks of the British government to De Sola.

Abraham de Sola frequently visited the United States, and, through his pulpit addresses and numerous contributions to the press, became recognized there as one of the most powerful leaders of Orthodox Judaism, at a time of heightened tension between the Orthodox and Reform wings of the community. He was intimately associated with Isaac Leeser, Samuel Myer Isaacs, Bernhard Illowy, J. J. Lyons, and other traditionalist religious leaders, and on Leeser's death was invited to become successor to his pulpit; but this and many similar offers he declined. For twenty years he was a constant contributor to Leeser's Occident, and after the latter's death he purchased the copyrights and stereotype plates of his works and continued their publication.

He died in New York City in 1882 and was buried in Montreal. His archives are held at McGill University.

== Personal life ==
De Sola married Esther Joseph on 30 June 1852. Amongst their children were Rev. Meldola de Sola, Canada's first native-born rabbi, and Clarence I. de Sola, a businessman and pioneer Canadian Zionist.

== Publications ==
Besides the below works, Abraham de Sola also contributed actively to the Jewish press, a large number of articles by him appearing in The Voice of Jacob, The Asmonean, The British-American Journal, and other contemporary Jewish journals. His articles on Sir John William Dawson's Archaia, Dawn of Life, and Origin of the World are specially noteworthy. He also edited and republished George Bethune English's Grounds of Christianity and a number of educational works.

=== Selected works ===
- "Scripture Zoology". The Occident. 15: 38–40. April 1847.
- "The Mosaic Cosmogony". 1852.
- The Cosmography of Peritsol. 1852.
- A Commentary on Samuel Hannagid's Introduction to the Talmud. 1852.
- Behemoth Hatemeoth: The Nomenclature of the Prohibited Animals of Leviticus. Montreal: John Lovell. 1853. ISBN 9780665550058.
- The Jewish Calendar for Fifty Years. Cincinnati and Chicago: Bloch Publishing and Printing Co. 1854. With Rev. Jacques J. Lyons.
- Philological Studies in Hebrew and Aramaic. 1857.
- "Lecture on Scripture Botany". The Occident: 90–93. May 1858.
- "Upon the Employment of Anæsthetics in Cases of Labour, in Connection with Jewish Law". British American Journal of Medical and Physical Sciences. 1860.
- The Sanatory Institutions of the Hebrews, as Exhibited in the Scriptures and Rabbinical writings, and as Bearing Upon the Modern Sanatory Regulations. Montreal: John Lovell. 1861.
- Valedictory Address to the Graduates in Arts of the University of McGill College, Montreal. Montreal: M. Longmoore & Co. 1864. ISBN 9780665624377.
- Biography of David Aaron de Sola. Philadelphia: Wm. H. Jones & Son. 1864.
- The Righteous Man. A Sermon Commemorating the Bestowal of Public Honours on Sir Moses Montefiore by the City of London. s.n. 1865. ISBN 9780665076893.
- Life of Shabbethai Tsevi, the Jewish False Messiah. 1869.
- The Study of Natural Science: An Address by the Rev. A. de Sola, LL.D., at the Conversazione Held in the Hall of the Natural History Society of Montreal, on Wednesday, 9th March, 1870. Montreal: John Lovell. 1870.
- History of the Jews of Poland. 1870.
- History of the Jews of France. 1871.
- Hebrew Numismatics. 1874.
- Forms of Prayer of the Spanish and Portuguese Jews. New edition, based on the versions of David Aaron de Sola and Isaac Leeser. Philadelphia: Sherman & Co. 1878.
- Life of Saadia Ha-Gaon. 1880.
- "Moses Spoke Truly". American Jewish Pulput: A Collection of Sermons by the Most Eminent American Rabbis. Cincinnati. 1881.
