= Isaac Samuel =

Rev. Isaac Samuel

Personal life
- Born: March 9, 1833 London, United Kingdom
- Died: October 24, 1914 (aged 81) London, United Kingdom
- Buried: Willesden Jewish Cemetery

Religious life
- Denomination: Orthodox Judaism

Senior posting
- Position: Ḥazzan
- Synagogue: Bayswater Synagogue
- Began: 1864
- Ended: 1914

Isaac Samuel (Hebrew: יצחק בן מרדכי סמואל; March 9, 1833 – October 24, 1914) was an English ḥazzan. He served at Bayswater Synagogue in London for approximately fifty years.

== Biography ==
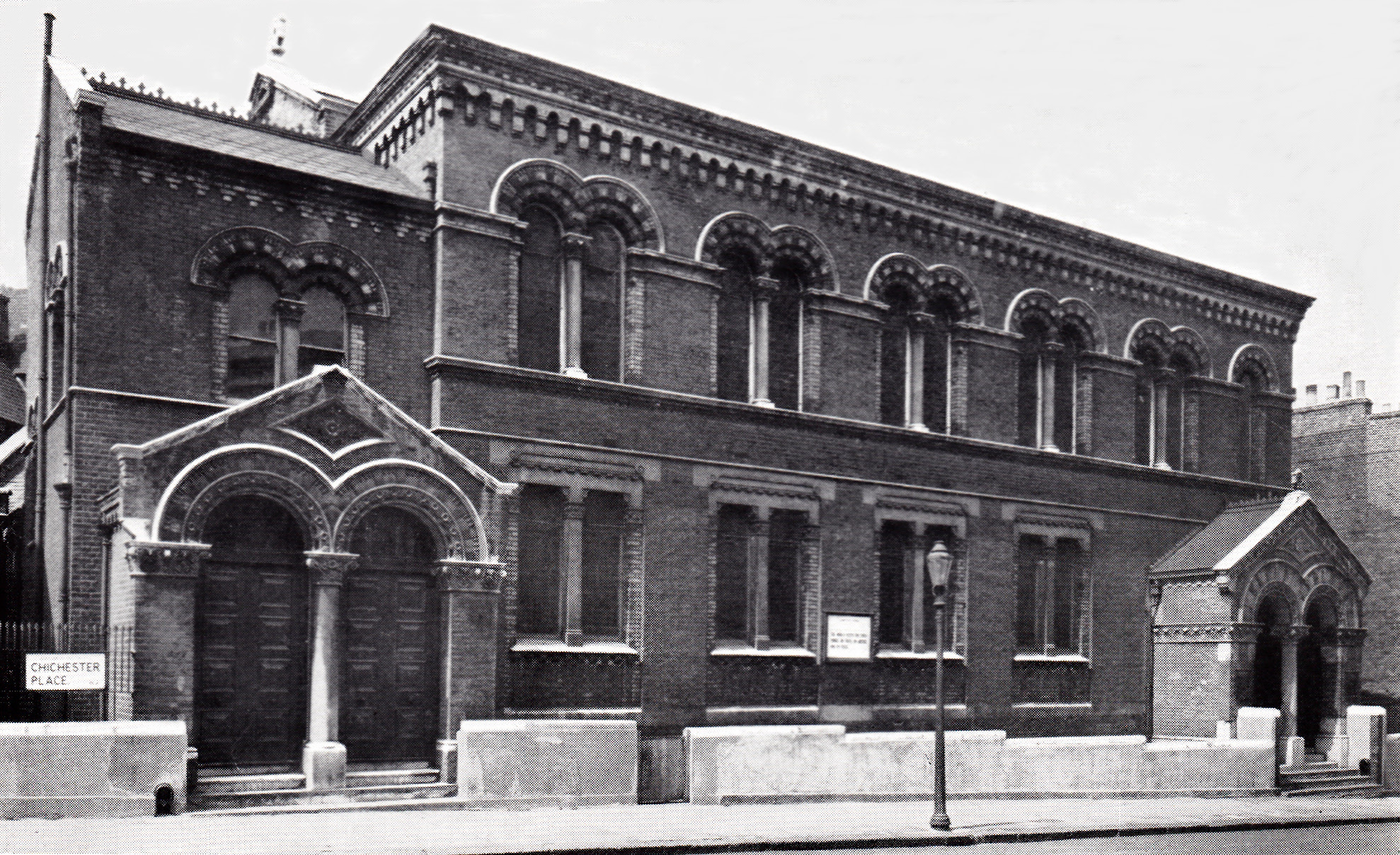
The former Bayswater Synagogue

Samuel was born into a Jewish family in the City of London on March 9, 1833.

In 1854, he was hired to direct the choir of the Great Portland Street Congregation. During this period he also operated a tobacconist business in Fleet Street. He afterwards served as minister of the Bristol Hebrew Congregation (1859/60–1864).

In 1864 Samuel became first reader of the recently established Bayswater Synagogue in London. He was appointed a teacher of ḥazzanut at Jews' College in 1888. He retired in February 1914, several months before his death.

== Chaplaincy and charitable work ==
Samuel was closely involved with the Jews' Deaf and Dumb Home, serving as its honorary secretary for forty-one years. He played an important role in the construction of the institution's building and its later expansion.

After serving in an honorary capacity for several years, he was appointed Jewish chaplain at Colney Hatch Asylum by the London County Council in 1892.

== Personal life ==
Samuel's first wife was Luisa Freideberg, who died in 1888. He married Henrietta Joseph of Brighton in 1900. He had ten children.

Among his children was Katherine (Katie) Samuel, who served as President of the Montreal section of Canada's National Council of Jewish Women and as Vice-President and Treasurer of the Montreal branch of the National Council of Women of Canada. She was married to the Canadian rabbi Aaron David Meldola de Sola. Samuel was also father-in-law of the rabbi Barnett A. Elzas.
