= Meldola (disambiguation) =

Meldola is a town in Emilia-Romagna, Italy.

Meldola may also refer to:

- Meldola Medal and Prize, award of the Royal Society of Chemistry
- Meldola (surname), surname
- Meldola de Sola (1853 – 1918), the first native-born Canadian rabbi
- Meldola blue, synthetic dye
