= Meldola (surname) =

Meldola is a surname. Notable people with this name include the following:

- Raphael Meldola (1849 – 1915), British chemist and entomologist
- Raphael Meldola (rabbi) (1754 – 1828), Rabbi who served in the United Kingdom of Great Britain and Ireland

== See also ==
- Meldola (disambiguation)
