= Charlotte Montefiore =

Anglo-Jewish author and philanthropist

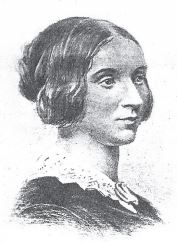
Charlotte Montefiore

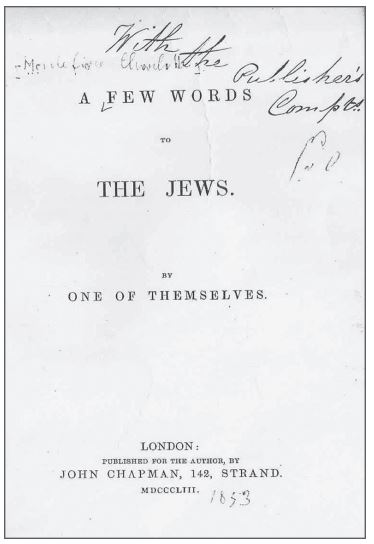
A Few Words to the Jews (1853) - Titlepage

Charlotte [Simcha/Schönche] Montefiore (14 April 1818 – 21 July 1854) was an Anglo-Jewish author and educational philanthropist.

== Life ==
Charlotte Simcha (or Shönche) Montefiore was the daughter of Abraham Montefiore (brother of Sir Moses Montefiore) and his second wife, Henriette (Jette) Rothschild, (youngest daughter of Mayer Amschel Rothschild). Born in London in 1818, she was the second of their four children. According to her obituary in the Jewish Chronicle she read widely, "embracing every species of literature and especially moral and ethical philosophy."

Montefiore devoted herself to charitable works and was particularly interested in the support of Jewish schools, including the Jews' Free School. She was a founder of the Jewish Emigration Society and of the Jewish Ladies' Benevolent Loan and Visiting Society. In 1841 she founded the "Cheap Jewish Library" (see below) with the help of Grace Aguilar and Rabbi David de Aaron de Sola. In the same year appeared (anonymously) her satirical novel Caleb Asher which attacked evangelical conversion movements directed at the Jewish community. In 1851 she published, again anonymously, a collection of essays A Few Words to the Jews, by One of Themselves. This set out the duty of British Jewry to improve "the rough and uncultivated nature" of the Jewish working class in England "for, if it is left to its own untutored guidance, it may stray into a wrong channel." Her authorship of all these works was only revealed after her death.

In 1847 Montefiore married her widowed uncle Horatio Joseph Montefiore (1798-1867), by whom she had two children, Helen Sarah (1848-1933) and Charles Abraham (1854-1945). She died the day after Charles's birth at Westbourne Terrace, Hyde Park.

Horatio had quit the Sephardi synagogue at Bevis Marks in 1842 to join the Reform Judaism congregation at West London Synagogue (alienating his brother Moses). Charlotte was therefore denied burial at the Sephardi cemetery, and is buried at the Jewish cemetery in Bancroft Road, Tower Hamlets. A charity was founded in her name shortly after her death to provide countryside excursions for poor urban Jewish families.

== "The Cheap Jewish Library" ==
"The Cheap Jewish Library, Dedicated to the Working Classes" was a periodical which appeared between 1841 and 1849. In starting it Charlotte may have been encouraged by her sister Louise. Charlotte and Grace Aguilar were the principal authors of the work, which was funded by Charlotte and had print-runs of between 250 - 500 copies. De Sola acted as editor and intermediary between Montefiore and Aguilar. Caleb Asher first appeared in instalments in the Library. In the opinion of Richa Dwor "Although the "Cheap Jewish Library" lost money, it fulfilled Montefiore's charitable aims [...] to address religious reform and conversion. It also provided a context in which female authors corresponded and encouraged one another in publication, and thus may be viewed as contributing to the beginnings of a Jewish women's movement in England." In 1856 the editor of the Jewish Chronicle wrote that "the original writings of the late Mrs. Montefiore are productions of which the community may well be proud."
