= Camilla Dufour Crosland =

English writer (1812–1895)

- Born: Camilla Dufour Toulmin; June 9, 1812; Aldermanbury, London
- Died: February 16, 1895 (aged 82); East Dulwich, London
- Writing career
- Genres: Fiction, poetry, essays

Camilla Dufour Crosland (born Camilla Dufour Toulmin, 9 June 1812 – 16 February 1895) was an English writer of fiction, poetry, essays and sketches. She also translated some plays and poetry by Victor Hugo.

== Life ==
She was born on 9 June 1812 at Aldermanbury, London, where her father, William Toulmin, practised as a solicitor; her grandfather, Dr William Toulmin, was a physician of repute. She was a precocious girl, who could read at the age of three and loved reading, although she lacked a systematic education. She had two half-brothers by her father's first marriage and a younger brother by his second. Her father, who had money troubles, died when Camilla was eight, and his widow and daughter were not provided for.

Camilla Toulmin first appeared in print in 1838, with verse contributions to the Book of Beauty. She was also involved in editorial work, for The New Monthly Belle Assemblée magazine, and the annuals The Keepsake, on behalf of Marguerite Power, and Friendship's Offering, as deputy to Leitch Ritchie.

Crosland was acquainted with numerous literary women, who included Mary Cowden Clarke, Mary Howitt, Mary Russell Mitford, Geraldine Jewsbury, Catherine Crowe, Lady Blessington and Frances Browne. She was especially close to Dinah Mulock, later Craik, who acted as her bridesmaid on 22 July 1848, when she married Newton Crosland, a London wine merchant with literary and scientific tastes. Crosland and her husband became interested in spiritualism in 1854 and discussed it in 1857 with the Brownings in Italy. She was touring Europe with her sister-in-law Sophia Crosland and the heiress Maria Fussell. Fussell would pass all of the bills to Camilla to pay as she was trying to keep her fortune a secret. She failed and Fussell ended up marrying a fortune hunter.

After living for nearly 38 years in Blackheath, Camilla Crosland moved in 1886 to 29 Ondine Road, East Dulwich, where she died on 16 February 1895. A memorial window has been placed to her memory in St Alban's Cathedral.

== Works ==
Crosland contributed work in many genres – poems, stories illustrating the condition of the poor, essays, and biographical and historical sketches – to periodicals such as The People's Journal, The London Journal, Bentley's Miscellany, the Old Monthly Magazine, The Illustrated London News, Douglas Jerrold's Magazine, Ainsworth's Magazine, and to annuals. For more than 50 years she was a regular contributor to Chambers's Journal, and at the time of her death she was its writer of longest standing.

Crosland published Light in the Valley: My Experiences of Spiritualism (1857), which has been described as a "credulous record" and was received badly by the public. In 1865 she published a three-volume novel, Mrs. Blake; in 1871 the Diamond Wedding, and other Poems; and in 1873 a second novel, Hubert Freeth's Prosperity. The 1875 cantata Summer Night for treble voices by Emanuel Aguilar set a sequence of seven of her lyrics.

Among her later productions were translations of Victor Hugo's plays, Hernani and Ruy Blas, with some of his poems, which appeared in Bohn's Library. In 1893 came her final work, Landmarks of a Literary Life, which is feminist in tone. Her husband's autobiography, Rambles Round My Life (1898) includes some extracts from her autobiographical writings that had remained in manuscript.

She wrote also:

- Lays and Legends illustrative of English Life (with engravings). 1845
- Poems. 1846
- Partners for Life: a Christmas Story. 1 vol. London: William S. Orr, 1847
- Stratagems: a Story for Young People. 1 vol. London: Arthur Hall. 1849
- The Young Lord, and Other Tales. 1 vol. London: Darton and Co. 1849
- Toil and Trial: a Story of London Life. 1849
- Lydia: a Woman's Book. 1 vol. London: Groombridge. 1852
- Stray Leaves from Shady Places. 1 vol. London: Routledge, 1852
- English Tales and Sketches (published in America in 1853)
- Memorable Women. 1854
- Hildred, the Daughter. 1 vol. London: Routledge, 1855
- Mrs. Blake: A Story of Twenty Years. 3 vol. London: Hurst and Blackett, 1862
- The Island of the Rainbow: A Fairy Tale and Other Fancies. 1 vol. London: Routledge, 1865
- Hubert Freeth's Prosperity. 3 vol. London: Hurst and Blackett, 1873
- Stories of the City of London, retold for Youthful Readers. 1880

She was also notable enough to have biographies written about her:

- Toulmin, Camila Dufour. By Edmund Toulmin Nicolle and published in the Dictionary of National Biography, 1885–1900
- Crosland, Camila. Published in A Cyclopaedia of Female Biography

== Notes ==
Attribution

This article incorporates text from a publication now in the public domain: Lee, Sidney, ed. (1899). "Toulmin, Camilla Dufour". Dictionary of National Biography. Vol. 57. London: Smith, Elder & Co.
