= Grace Aguilar =

English novelist, poet and writer (1816–1847)

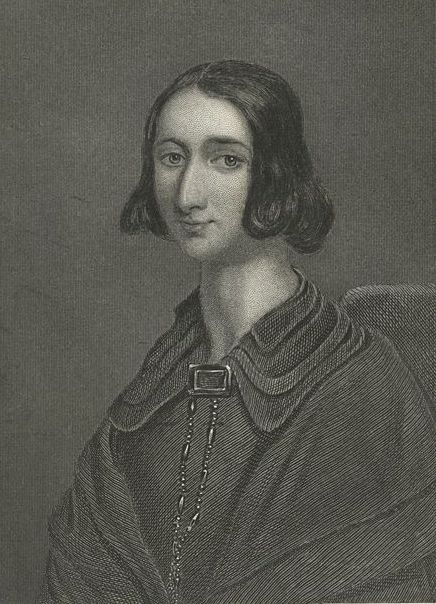
- Grace Aguilar
- Born: 2 June 1816; Hackney, London, England
- Died: 16 September 1847 (aged 31); Frankfurt, Hessen, Germany
- Resting place: Frankfurt Jewish cemetery, Hessen, Germany
- Occupations: Novelist, poet, essayist

Grace Aguilar (2 June 1816 – 16 September 1847) was an English novelist, poet and writer on Jewish history and religion. Although she had been writing since childhood, much of her work was published posthumously. Among those are her best known works, the novels Home Influence and A Mother's Recompense.

Aguilar was the eldest child of Sephardic Jewish refugees from Portugal - Emmanuel and Sara - who settled in the London Borough of Hackney in Paragon Terrace/Road and 5, West(gate) Street, Triangle, and later 1, Clarence Place, Clapton. An early illness resulted in her being educated by her parents, especially her mother, who taught her the tenets of Judaism. Later, her father taught the history of Spanish and Portuguese Jews during his own bout with tuberculosis which had led the family to move to the English coast. After surviving the measles at the age of 19, she began to embark on a serious writing career, even though her physical health never completely recovered.

Aguilar's debut was an anonymous collection of poems, The Magic Wreath of Hidden Flowers. Three years later she translated Isaac Orobio de Castro's Israel Defended into English at her father's behest. Later her The Spirit of Judaism drew interest and sales in both Britain and the United States after being published in Philadelphia by Isaac Leeser. He added a preface to the work elucidating his differences with her, the first of many clashes her work would have with mainstream Jewish thought.

In the 1840s her novels began to attract regular readers, and Aguilar moved back to London with her parents. Despite her success, she and her mother still had to operate a boys' Hebrew school to stay solvent, which she resented for the time and energy it took from her writing. In 1847, she became ill again with a spinal paralysis which she did not let prevent her from visiting her brother, the pianist Emanuel Abraham Aguilar, in Frankfurt. Her health worsened and she died there that September.

== Biography ==
=== Childhood ===
Grace Aguilar was born in the east London suburb of Hackney on 2 June 1816. She was the oldest child of her parents, who were both descended from Portuguese Jews. Her family settled in Jamaica and eventually in England in the 18th century following the Portuguese Inquisition. Emanuel, her father, was the lay leader of London's Spanish and Portuguese Synagogue, and her mother Sarah was active in the city's Jewish community as well. Her religious background and illnesses, both hers and her parents', were major factors in her life and influential on her work.

=== Illness and education ===
For her first eight years, Aguilar was an only child. During this time, Aguilar suffered from a chronic long-term illness that led her parents to educate her at home. She was tutored in the classics at home and (even in adulthood) was not permitted to move outside of her family circle. Her mother, in keeping with post-Inquisition practice among Sephardic Jews from the Iberian Peninsula, educated the young Aguilar in her religion and its tenets. Her condition did not stop her from learning to dance and play the harp and piano, common pursuits for middle-class English girls of that era, or traveling. After her brother Emanuel was born in 1823 the family went on an extended tour of Gloucestershire.

When Aguilar's father contracted tuberculosis, the family moved to Devon. While Grace was taking care of him, her father taught her the oral history of the Jews of Spain and Portugal, complementing her mother's earlier instruction in Judaism. He may also have taught her Hebrew, which was extremely unusual for a Jewish woman to know at that time. Both her religious and literary interests date to that time of her life; she began indulging them both by making her first efforts at poetry and fiction and attending some Protestant services. A collection of conch shells she found on a Teignmouth beach spurred her to attempt a scientific paper on the subject.

Sarah Aguilar's health took a turn for the worse during this period, as she recovered from surgical treatment for an illness that has not yet been identified from the records available, and Grace spent time taking care of her as she had her father. In 1835, at the age of 19, Grace was again taken ill herself, with measles. She never completely recovered.

=== Writing career ===
The family moved to Brighton afterwards, perhaps to be closer to London's Jewish community. The two Aguilar boys had been sent to boarding school, but with her parents' health declining, Grace began to think about her responsibilities to not only them but her brothers as well. She decided to try making a living as a writer, and that year was able to get her first book of poems published. Her first book was successful enough that a second run was printed in 1839, and she began writing in earnest.

Much of this work was published posthumously, with one exception. In 1838 Aguilar's father prevailed upon her to translate Isaac Orobio de Castro's Israel Defended, an apologia for Judaism, from the original French for private distribution among Brighton's Jewish community. She added a preface that, albeit with some ambivalence, explained that she had softened Orobio's castigations of Christians as a result of the tolerance she felt Victorian England had shown to its Jewish population compared with Catholic Spain and Portugal. Two years later the family returned to London.

There, Aguilar befriended the young Benjamin Disraeli, whose father Isaac was a well-known author. The older man was able to help her find a publisher. He declined, but on her own she was able to persuade Isaac Leeser, editor of The Occident, an American Jewish magazine, to publish her theological tract The Spirit of Judaism as the initial volume of a new series of books he was bringing out. The original manuscript was lost at sea, but Aguilar was able to recreate it from her notes, and it was published in 1842. When she received her copy, Aguilar was angry that Leeser had added a preface detailing his differences of opinion with Aguilar.

The book was nevertheless well-received, and Aguilar began publishing poems in small English journals. Isaac D'Israeli now chose to help her, possibly introducing her to Edward Moxon, his own publisher. Moxon in turn introduced her to R. Groombridge & Sons, the large publisher that would eventually bring out most of her work in Britain.

Despite her anger over the preface he added to The Spirit of Judaism, Aguilar continued to publish her poetry in Leeser's journals. She befriended Solomon Cohen, the first Jewish state senator in Georgia and his wife Miriam, which contributed to the success of her work in the South as they distributed her books widely there. In England, her domestic fiction drew readers and acclaim. However, she still needed to run a boys' Hebrew school with her mother to make enough money to live on, an obligation she complained about bitterly and repeatedly in her letters to Miriam Cohen, since she felt it took away from the time she had to write. She also anguished over the fate of her brother Henry, who had chosen a career as a sailor.

The last years of her life were busy. In 1841 she joined with Charlotte Montefiore writing the periodical "The Cheap Jewish Library, Dedicated to the Working Classes", which has been described as "providing a context in which female authors corresponded and encouraged one another in publication, and thus [...] contributing to the beginnings of a Jewish women's movement in England." Aguilar turned to nonfiction, producing Women of Israel, an account of the lives of Jewish women that was recognized as her masterpiece. In 1845, the family was able to move again, to a house on Hackney's Clapton Square, where she tended to her father until his death the following year.

=== Last years and death ===
In 1847 Aguilar came down with a spinal paralysis; in spite of the illness she went ahead with a planned trip to Europe. Before her departure some Jewish women of London presented her with a gift and an address recounting her achievements in behalf of Judaism and Jewish women. She later visited Emanuel at Frankfurt, where he had become a successful musician. At first she seemed to benefit by the change of scene and climate, but after a few weeks she went to the baths of Schwalbach for treatment. More symptoms led her return to Frankfurt, where she died on 16 September 1847. Aguilar was buried at the Frankfurt Jewish cemetery in Hessen, Germany. The epitaph of her tombstone was taken from Proverbs 31, the section of the biblical work on the "woman of valor":"Give her of the fruit of her hands; and let her own works praise her at the gate".

== Literary works ==
Aguilar's literary career began with the diary she started at seven and continued, uninterrupted, until her death. Before she was twelve she had written a drama, Gustavus Vasa, which has since been lost. Her first verses were evoked two years later by the scenery about Tavistock in Devonshire. Her early collected poems, under the title The Magic Wreath of Hidden Flowers, were published anonymously in 1835; each is a riddle with clues to the name of a particular flower.

Aguilar's productions are chiefly stories and religious works dealing with Jewish subjects. The former embrace domestic tales, tales founded on Marano history, and a romance of Scottish history, The Days of Bruce (1852). The most popular of the Jewish tales is The Vale of Cedars, or the Martyr: A Story of Spain in the Fifteenth Century, written before 1835, published in 1850, and twice translated into German and twice into Hebrew. Her other stories founded on Jewish episodes are included in a collection of nineteen tales, Home Scenes and Heart Studies (published posthumously 1852); The Perez Family (1843) and The Edict together with The Escape, had appeared as two separate volumes; the others were reprinted from magazines. Her domestic tales are Home Influence (1847) and its sequel, The Mother's Recompense (1851), both of them written early in 1836, Woman's Friendship (1851), and Helon: A Fragment from Jewish History (1852).

The first of Aguilar's religious works was a translation of the French version of Israel Defended, by the Marrano Orobio de Castro, printed for private circulation. It was closely followed by "The Spirit of Judaism," the publication of which was for a time prevented by the loss of the original manuscript. Sermons by Rabbi Isaac Leeser, of Philadelphia, had fallen into her hands and, like all other accessible Jewish works, had been eagerly read. She requested him to revise the manuscript of the Spirit of Judaism, which was forwarded to him, but was lost. The author rewrote it; and in 1842 it was published in Philadelphia, with notes by Leeser. A second edition was issued in 1849 by the first American Jewish Publication Society; and a third (Cincinnati, 1864) has an appendix containing thirty-two poems (bearing date 1838-1847), all but two reprinted from "The Occident". The editor's notes serve mainly to mark dissent from Aguilar's depreciation of Jewish tradition – due probably to her Marrano ancestry and to her country life, cut off from association with Jews. In 1845 The Women of Israel appeared—a series of portraits delineated according to the Scriptures and Josephus. This was soon followed by "The Jewish Faith: Its Spiritual Consolation, Moral Guidance, and Immortal Hope," in thirty-one letters, the last dated September, 1846. Of this work—addressed to a Jewess under the spell of Christian influence, to demonstrate to her the spirituality of Judaism—the larger part is devoted to immortality in the Old Testament. Aguilar's other religious writings —some of them written as early as 1836—were collected in a volume of Essays and Miscellanies (1851–52). The first part consists of Sabbath Thoughts on Scriptural passages and prophecies; the second, of "Communings" for the family circle.

In her religious writings Aguilar's attitude was defensive. Despite her almost exclusive intercourse with Christians and her utter lack of prejudice, her purpose, apparently, was to equip English Jewish women with arguments against conversionists. She inveighed against formalism, and laid stress upon knowledge of Jewish history and the Hebrew language. In view of the neglect of the latter by women (to whom she modestly confined her expostulations), she constantly pleaded for the reading of the Scriptures in the English version. Her interest in the reform movement was deep; yet, despite her attitude toward tradition, she observed ritual ordinances punctiliously. Her last work was a sketch of the "History of the Jews in England", written for "Chambers's Miscellany." In point of style it is the most finished of her productions, free from the exuberances and redundancies that disfigure the tales—published, for the most part, posthumously by her mother. The defects of her style are mainly chargeable to youth. With her extraordinary industry—she rose early and employed the day systematically—and her growing ability of concentration she gave promise of noteworthy productions.

== Works ==
- Woman's Friendship: A Story Of Domestic Life (1850)
- The Vale of Cedars; Or, The Martyr (1851)
- Home Influence: A Tale for Mothers and Daughters (1856)
- The Mother's Recompense, Volume 1, 2 (1859)
- Home influence: a tale for mothers and daughters (1870)
- The Days of Bruce. A story from Scottish History. Vol. I; The Days of Bruce. Vol. II (1871)
- Home Scenes and Heart Studies (1869)
- Women of Israel. Vol. I (1876)

== Legacy ==
The Aguilar branch of the New York Public Library, located in the East Harlem section of New York City is named after Grace Aguilar.
