= Hermann Gollancz =

British rabbi and Hebrew scholar

Sir Hermann Gollancz
- Sir Hermann Gollancz in 1923
- Born: 30 November 1852; Bremen, Germany
- Died: 15 October 1930 (aged 77); London, England
- Relatives: Sir Israel Gollancz (brother)

Academic background
- Education: University College, London

Academic work
- Institutions: University College, London

Sir Hermann Gollancz (30 November 1852 – 15 October 1930) was a British rabbi and Hebrew scholar. Gollancz was the first Jew to earn a doctor of literature degree from London University and the first holder of the degree to be ordained as a rabbi. He was also the first British rabbi to be granted a knighthood, when he was knighted in 1923.

== Biography ==
Gollancz was born in Bremen, Germany, the son of Rabbi Samuel Marcus Gollancz, who led the Hambro Synagogue. He earned his degree at University College London and started preaching in 1876. As there was no rabbinical training program in England at the time, he went back to Eastern Europe and received his rabbinic ordination in 1897 from the chief rabbis of Galicia, insisting thereafter that he be called "Rabbi" rather than "Reverend" and be called to the Torah with the honorific HaRav. Gollancz served from 1892 to 1923 as rabbi of the Bayswater Synagogue and was a Professor of Hebrew at University College London from June 1902 to 1924, after which he served as a professor emeritus.

Gollancz produced a translation of the Hebrew Scriptures "for Jewish families, which adhered 'as closely as possible to the excellent Anglican version of the 17th century' (King James Version)" He also translated from Hebrew and Aramaic the Targum to the Song of Songs. His autobiography is titled Personalia, published in 1928.

Gollancz was later named minister emeritus of the United Synagogue and served as president of the Jewish Historical Society of England in 1905 and 1906. In the 1923 Birthday Honours, King George V conferred a knighthood upon him "in recognition of his contributions to learning", making him the first rabbi to receive a knighthood. He received the accolade from the king at Buckingham Palace on 25 July 1923. His service to the Jewish community included the creation of numerous synagogues to serve workers at industrial plants, visiting the sick and assisting the poor. He was an advocate for public libraries and helped establish the Mocatta Library at University College, to which he donated thousands of volumes when he concluded his 21 years as Goldschmid Professor of Hebrew.

Gollancz died in London on 15 October 1930, at the age of 77. He was the elder brother of Shakespearean and English literature scholar Sir Israel Gollancz and the uncle of publisher Victor Gollancz. His 35-year-old son Leonard committed suicide jumping out of a hotel window in Torquay in a "moment of sudden impulse caused by nervous strain", after which Lady Gollancz suffered a stroke. His son, oldest sister and wife all died within a ten-day span in 1929 and his brother died four months before he did.

Gollancz was buried at the Willesden Jewish Cemetery on 19 October, and the funeral was followed later in the day by a memorial service at the Bayswater Synagogue where he had ministered for so many years.
