= Barnett A. Elzas =

American rabbi and historian (1867–1936)

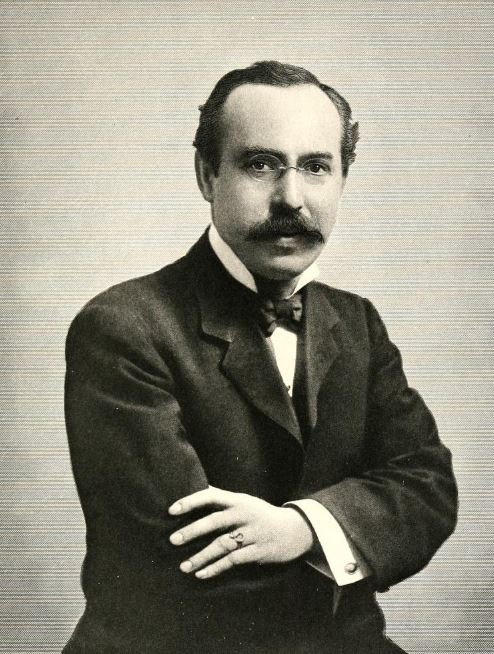

Personal life
- Born: December 7, 1867 Eydtkuhnen, Prussia
- Died: October 18, 1936 (aged 68) New York City, New York
- Spouse: Annie Samuel (m. 1890)

Religious life
- Denomination: Reform

Barnett Abraham Elzas (December 7, 1867 – October 18, 1936) was a German-born American rabbi and historian.

== Life ==
Elzas was born on December 7, 1867, in Eydtkuhnen, Prussia, the son of Abraham Elzas and Hinda Lewinthal. His father was a Dutch-born rabbi and author who moved to England in 1871.

Elzas attended Jews' College in London, England, from 1880 to 1890. He also went to University College, London, where he was a Hollier Scholar in 1886, and London University, where he received a B.A. in 1885. In 1890, he moved to Toronto, Canada and studied at the University of Toronto, graduating from there in 1893. He was ordained a rabbi in 1890, and he served as rabbi of the Holy Blossom Temple in Toronto from 1890 to 1893. He was briefly rabbi in Sacramento, California. He then became rabbi of Congregation Beth Elohim in Charleston, South Carolina, from 1894 to 1910. While serving as rabbi there, he became interested in the history of Jews in South Carolina and wrote several studies on that history, most notably The Jews of South Carolina from the Earliest Times to the Present Day in 1905. During that time, he engaged in a long controversy with Leon Huhner over Huhner's article on Charleston in The Jewish Encyclopedia.

Elzas graduated from the Medical College of South Carolina in 1900, although he never practiced medicine. In 1910, he moved to New York City, New York, and became Jewish chaplain to the City Department of Correction and the State Mental Hygiene Department. In 1912, he also became rabbi of Beth Miriam Congregation in Long Branch, New Jersey. He was also a chaplain at the State Hospital in Central Islip. He was minister to New York City's Jewish deaf from 1910 to his death, serving the Society for the Welfare of the Jewish Deaf from 1910 to 1913 and the Hebrew Association of the Deaf from 1924 until his death. He was president of the New York Board of Jewish Ministers from 1927 to 1929. In 1930, he was elected a director of the Jewish Academy of Arts and Science.

Elzas was a member of the Society of Oriental Research, the Linguistic Society of America, the Society of Biblical Literature, the American Oriental Society, the American Historical Association, and the Shriners. He was also chaplain of the Actors' Church Alliance, master of the local Freemason council, and deputy president of B'nai B'rith in South Carolina. In 1890, he married Annie Samuel, daughter of Rabbi Isaac Samuel of London, England. They had three children, but only one of them survived, Sybil Edna. Sybil married Lewis T. Mann.

Elzas died at home on October 18, 1936.
