= Isaac Orobio de Castro =

Portuguese Jewish philosopher, physician and author (c.1617–1687)

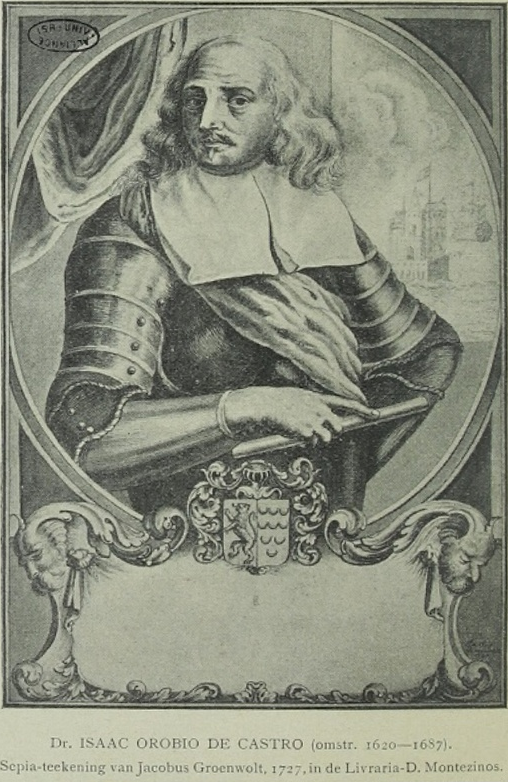
Orobio de Castro

Balthazar (Isaac) Orobio de Castro (c.1617 in Bragança, Portugal – November 7, 1687 in Amsterdam), was a Portuguese Jewish philosopher, physician and religious apologist.

== Life ==
While still a child, he was taken to Seville by his parents, who were Marranos. He studied philosophy at Alcalá de Henares and became teacher of metaphysics at the University of Salamanca. Later he devoted himself to the study of medicine, and became a popular practitioner in Seville, and physician in ordinary to the duke of Medina-Celi and to a family nearly related to the king.

When married and father of a family, De Castro was, at the instigation of a servant whom he had punished for theft, denounced to the Inquisition as an adherent of Judaism, and thrown into a dark and narrow dungeon, where he remained for three years, subjected to the most frightful tortures. As he persistently denied the charge, he was finally released, but compelled to leave Spain and to wear the sanbenito, or penitential garment, for two years. He thereupon went to Toulouse, where he became professor of medicine at the university, at the same time receiving from Louis XIV the title of councilor; but, weary at last of hypocrisy and dissimulation, he went to Amsterdam about 1666, and there made a public confession of Judaism, adopting the name "Isaac." In that city De Castro continued the practice of medicine, and soon became a celebrity, being elected to membership in the directory of the Portuguese congregation and of several academies of poetry. He died at Amsterdam. Esther, his wife, died on July 5, 1712.

== Works ==
Orobio de Castro was a very prolific writer. His work entitled Certamen Philosophicum Propugnatæ Veritatis Divinæ ac Naturalis Adversus J. Bredenburgi Principia was published at Amsterdam, 1684 (reprinted 1703 and 1731). This work, in which De Castro attacks the Ethics of Spinoza, with whom he maintained a friendly correspondence, was translated into Spanish under the title Certamen Philosophico, Defiende la Verdad Divina y Natural Contra los Principios de Juan Bredenburg, by G. de la Torre, (The Hague, 1741). Certamen Philosophicum was translated into english in September 2020, by Walter Hilliger.

All the other writings of De Castro, like the foregoing translation, are still extant in manuscript. They are:

- Prevenciones Divinas Contra la Vana Ydolatria de las Gentes (Libro ii, Contra los Falsos Misterios de las Gentes Advertidas a Ysrael en los Escritos Propheticos);
- Explicação Paraphrastica sobre o Capitulo 53 do Propheta Isahias. Feito por hum Curiozo da Nação Hebrea em Amsterdam, em o mez de Tisry anno 5433 (compare Adolf Neubauer, The Fifty-third Chapter of Isaiah, pp. 21–118, London, 1876);
- Tratado em que se Explica la Prophesia de las 70 Semanas de Daniel. Em Amsterdam à 6 Febrero anno 1675, a paraphrastic explanation of the Prophecy of Seventy Weeks;
- Epistola Invectiva Contra un Judio Philosopho Médico, que Negava la Ley de Mosse, y Siendo Atheista Affectava la Ley de Naturaleza. This is identical with Epistola Invectiva Contra Prado, un Philosopho Medico, que Dubitava, o no Creya la Verdad de la Divina Escritura, y Pretendió Encubrir su Malicia con la Affecta Confacion de Dios, y Ley de Natureza, a work directed against Juan de Prado, a physician and author of Picardy who resided in Amsterdam.

Long after De Castro's death a Jew by the name of Henriquez published an alleged work of his in French under the title Israel Vengé, claiming it to have been originally written in Spanish (London, 1770). It has been translated into English by Grace Aguilar (London, 1839).

De Castro's discussions on Christianity with the Dutch Remonstrant theologian Philipp van Limborch were published by the latter in the work entitled De Veritate Religionis Christianæ Amica Collatio cum Erudito Judæo, Amsterdam, 1687.

== The de Castro family ==
The various branches of this family are all of Spanish and Portuguese origin. Some have continued to bear the simple name of "De Castro", others are known as De Castro-Osorio; De Castro Sarmento; De Castro-Castello-Osorio; Pereira de Castro; De Castro Vieira de Pinto; Rodriguez de Castro; Orobio de Castro; De Castro de Paz; Henriquez de Castro, etc.

== See also ==
- De Castro family (Sephardi Jewish)
- Marranos
- Crypto-Jews
- History of the Jews in the Netherlands
