= Emanuel Abraham Aguilar =

English concert pianist and composer (1824–1904)

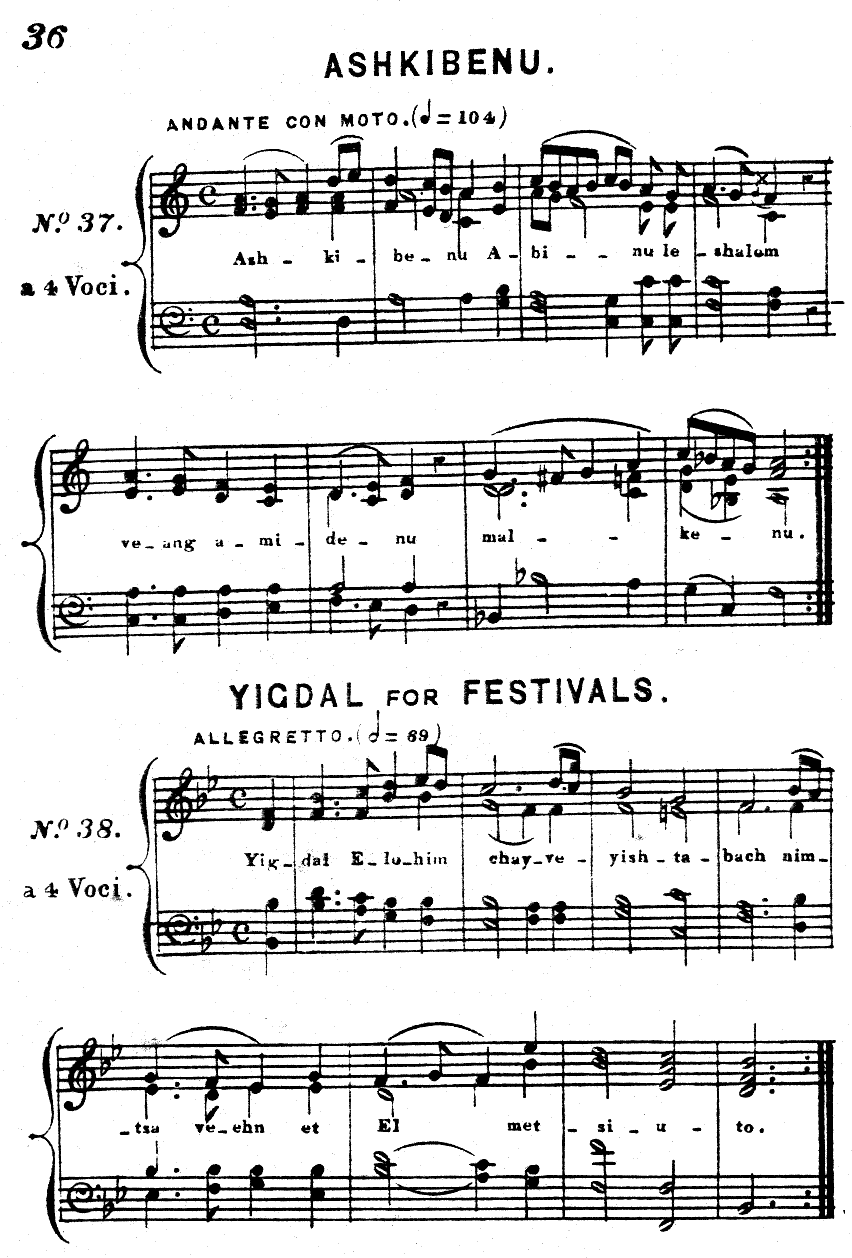
Ashkibenu (Hashkiveinu) and Yigdal from the Spanish and Portuguese Jews' Congregation in London, harmonised by Emanuel Aguilar.

Emanuel Abraham Aguilar (23 August 1824 – 18 February 1904), was an English concert pianist and composer of Portuguese parentage.

== Life ==
Born in Clapham, London, Aguilar was the son of Sephardic Jewish refugees from Portugal who settled in London. His father was the city merchant Emanuel Aguilar (1787–1845) and his mother Sarah Diaz Fernandez (1787–1854). His sister was the novelist Grace Aguilar. He studied piano and composition in Frankfurt, and was the first to perform Chopin’s F minor Concerto there. In 1847 his sister, whose health was already failing her, visited him at his Frankfurt home and died there, aged 31.

Returning to London in 1848 he established himself as a soloist and set himself up as a teacher - though he frequently returned to Germany for concerts (for instance at the Gewandhaus in Leipzig on 30 March 1848) and as a visiting composer, as for the premiere performance of his second symphony in 1851.

From the 1850s Aguiar lived at 68 Upper Norton Street (now Bolsover Street) in Marylebone. Later addresses were 17 Gloucester Crescent in Paddington (from the 1870s), and at the lodging house 7 Weymouth Street in Marylebone (1901–1904). He married twice and was widowed twice. His first wife was Sarah Lindo, who he met in Frankfurt and married there in 1848. She died on giving birth to their fifth child in 1868. His second wife was Ellen Britton, who died in 1883, aged 42. Aguilar died in Marylebone, aged 79.

== Music ==
His official opus 1, the Grand Duo Concertant for cello and piano, was published in Leipzig in 1848. Three symphonies form the core of his orchestral work and show the extent of his early ambitions as a composer. Symphony No 1 in C was a student work, composed in 1844 and premiered in Frankfurt. The Symphony No 2 in E minor received its orchestral premiere in 1851, also in Frankfurt. The Symphony No 3 was composed in 1854 and received a London premiere.

There were two operas: The Wave King (1855, based on a romantic German legend) and The Bridal Wreath (1863). Both remained unstaged, although a concert performance of The Wave King was heard in a private performance at 148 Westbourne Terrace in April 1863, and parts of The Bridal Wreath were given at the tenor Trelawney Cobham's concert at the Vestry Hall in Chelsea on Monday 11 March, 1867. And there were three cantatas: Summer Night (1875, text by Camilla Dufour Crosland); The Bridal of Triermain (Walter Scott, produced at a Bedford Musical Society concert, 27 October 1880); and Goblin Market (1880, adapted in collaboration with the poet Christina Rossetti). The latter, lightly sanitised to make it acceptable for school children (it is marked "for treble voices"), received "a modest performance" at the composer's home on 10 January 1880.

Later in his career there were many songs, piano solos (including the Sonata in C, 1865 and the four Morceaux de Salon, 1869), piano duets, and a substantial amount of chamber music, including three trios, two quartets, a piano quartet, a sextet and a septet. Many of these were performed at Musical Artists' Society concerts. He also published a collection of canons and fugue transcriptions intended as preparatory exercises for the playing of Bach, as well as A Little Book About Learning the Pianoforte (1866, revised and expanded as How to Learn the Pianoforte, 1883).

However, Aguilar's most enduring work, still in use today, was his religious music for the Spanish and Portuguese Jews’ Congregation of London. He is remembered for notating and arranging The ancient melodies of the liturgy of the Spanish and Portuguese Jews, published in 1857 in collaboration with the rabbi and author David de Aaron de Sola and the Spanish-Portuguese synagogue of Bevis Marks in London.
