= Maria Fussell =

British benefactress

Maria Mary Fussell
- Born: 15 July 1834; Nunney
- Died: 20 December 1881 (aged 47); St James's, London
- Known for: her divorce and as a benefactor
- Spouse: Pierre Philip Eugene de Gendre

Maria Mary Fussell became Maria de Gendre; Countess de Gendre (15 July 1834 – 20 December 1881) was a British benefactress. She married an abusive and unfaithful fortune hunter, and this ended in a divorce. She died in her 40s having given large donations to the church which created 33 new London parishes.

== Life ==
Fussell was born in Nunney. She was one of the two daughters of Maria Mary (born Dowding) and John Fussell. Her father was a partner in a company created by James Fussell IV. The company was known then for creating edge tools for the agricultural business. When her father died in 1853, he left £200,000 in trust for his daughters and an annuity for their mother.

She toured Europe with her sister-in-law Sophia Crosland and the writer Camilla Dufour Crosland. Fussell would pass all of the bills to Camilla to pay as she was trying to keep her fortune a secret. She failed and the information leaked to another hotel guest, Pierre Philip Eugene de Gendre. Camilla Dufour Crosland and her husband, Newton Crosland, (a London wine merchant) had become interested in spiritualism in 1854 and discussed it in 1857 with the Brownings in Italy.

Pierre Philip Eugene de Gendre, who was a member of the king of Naples' Swiss guard, devoted his time to courting Fussell and arranged that he would stay at the same hotel in Florence. Fussell was taken by his attentions, and she admitted to her party that she was secretly betrothed to him. They married in England at Dover on 1 May 1858. The marriage was quickly seen as a disaster. Her husband was not only unfaithful, but he was abusive. She developed breast cancer, and this was put down to her mistreatment.

Her trustees objected when she tried to give her husband £40,000 and the sum was limited to £10,000. Her disappointed husband soon spent or gambled that sum. One of his purchases was to buy a title from the pope so she became Countess de Gendre. Divorce proceedings followed an episode in May 1870 where her husband arranged for her to be kidnapped and brought back to his home. At the time she had been recovering from an operation on the cancer. The details of the divorce includes not only her abduction, but also her husband's attempts to sexually abuse their servants, his adulteries and that he had persuaded her to fake a pregnancy so that he could claim to have a son. Her husband did not contest the divorce and he was given a £200 annuity which he spent in Paris. Fussell was able to return her name to Fussell and to annull the marriage settlement.

Fussell became even wealthier when her mother and her sister died. There were family disputes over her fortune, and these may have helped to shape her will.

Fussell died in St James in 1881. She instructed that only people named in her will could attend the funeral. She left nothing to the Fussell family, and the majority of her estate was left to Archibald Campbell Tait's London Diocesan Home Mission. The money was used to create over thirty new parishes in London, which in time would have their own churches. A memorial was installed in St Paul's Cathedral to her memory by Sarah Crosland.
