= Carla DeSola =

American choreographer

Carla DeSola (born 1937) is a choreographer, teacher, and performer who has built her reputation as a pioneer and advocate of liturgical dance over more than 40 years. In 1974 she founded the Omega Liturgical Dance Company which was soon based at the Cathedral of St. John the Divine in New York. In the 1990s she founded the Omega West Dance Company in the San Francisco Bay area. A Carla DeSola collection is being developed in the archives of the Graduate Theological Union library in Berkeley, Ca.

== Training and early initiatives in liturgical dance ==
Born on 24 April 1937, Carla Desola grew up in New York City. As a child, she danced informally and also spent a year at the Hanya Holm dance school. She studied dance for four years at the Juilliard School of Music where she was inspired by the work of her teacher José Limón, especially by his ballet Missa Brevis and other dance work with religious and spiritual elements. After graduating from Juilliard in 1960 she began to develop a modern dance company, but then changed direction, experimented with liturgical dance and founded the Omega Liturgical Dance Company (Omega). This was named after the Omega Point, a spiritual concept of Teilhard de Chardin's. The dance company was offered space in the crypt of the Episcopal cathedral, St. John the Divine, where DeSola built a studio with her future husband, Arthur Eaton.

Around 1970 DeSola, who had grown up in a non-religious Jewish home, became interested in Catholicism and eventually converted. She also became interested in social issues, and was particularly concerned about poverty. These interests overlapped with themes she explored in dances choreographed for Omega and performed at the Cathedral Basilica of Saints Peter and Paul in Philadelphia and also at the Cathedral of St. John the Divine in the 1970s. DeSola presented ideas derived from her teaching in her 1974 book Learning Through Dance. Three years later she explained more of her dance philosophy in The Spirit Moves: A Handbook of Dance and Prayer.

== Career ==
In 1978 a critic in the New York Times wrote: “As a contemporary form, it [liturgical dance] was virtually nonexistent in this country before Miss DeSola's pioneering efforts a decade ago…” She gradually integrated her formal training with her aim of expressing worship and prayer through dance. DeSola places an emphasis on the "overlap between body and spirit", and believes people can experience dancing as a kind of "movement meditation". She makes a distinction between carefully choreographed dance with confident, experienced performers for services, and teaching that encourages untrained dancers to "move spiritually". Unlike religious dance in some traditions, where all dance is spontaneous, DeSola's liturgical dance is well-rehearsed.

This unfamiliar art form was controversial and some Catholics disapproved. A 1980 book, Pope Paul's New Mass by Michael Davies, criticised DeSola in a chapter asserting “there is no place for dancing, liturgical or otherwise, within the Catholic liturgy”. DeSola’s work continued to grow and in 1981 she told the New York Times "acceptance is seeping into all denominations." Though at that time Omega was most often invited to perform by “liberal groups in the Catholic Church”, by 1981 they had also “performed at churches and synagogues in a half-dozen states”.

It was in the 1980s that Desola first taught a class for the Sacred Dance Guild, an organisation sympathetic to her work. This was when she made first contact with Dr Doug Adams, professor at the Pacific School of Religion who initiated the Center for Arts, Religion and Education at the Graduate Theological Union in Berkeley. He later became influential in her professional life. This period also saw the first year of the Earth Mass celebration at St John's Cathedral in 1985, when dancing choreographed by DeSola was added to Paul Winter's music, Missa Gaia. The Mass is attended by thousands of people and is celebrated annually for the Feast of St. Francis.

In 1990 DeSola moved to California, when she was invited to join the Pacific School of Religion faculty. She also studied there and received a Master of Arts degree in Theology and the Arts in 1993. Since the early 1990s she has been involved with the Center for Arts, Religion and Education at the Graduate Theological Union, teaching and serving on its board of directors. She also started the Omega West dance company in San Francisco.

Over the years she has created many liturgical dances for a variety of audiences and congregations. She is known for devising works on the theme of peace, and has published PeaceRites: Dance and the Art of Making Peace. She has taught in numerous different settings, in the US and abroad, and has been described as a “a liturgical dance pioneer”, a “leader in the sacred dance movement” and “one of the most prominent figures in liturgical dance”

She has been recognised with a Bene Award from Modern Liturgy Magazine (1993), a cover photo and story in Dance Magazine (December 2001), naming as a “Living Legacy” at the Sacred Dance Guild Golden Anniversary Festival in 2008, a Distinguished Alumni Award from the Pacific School of Religion (2010 ), the title Honorary Member of the Sacred Dance Guild in 2011, and becoming a mentor for Dance USA in 2016.

Her papers and videos etc. have been acquired by the Graduate Theological Union library to form the nucleus of a Carla DeSola collection.

== Note ==
Her last name is sometimes written as two words: De Sola.
