= Meldola de Sola =

Canadian rabbi (1853–1918)

Rev. Meldola de Sola
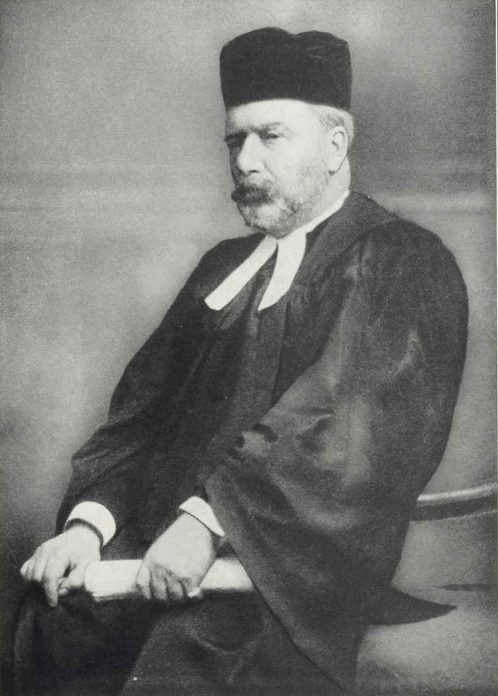

Personal life
- Born: Aaron David Meldola de Sola; 22 November 1853 Montreal, Province of Canada
- Died: 29 April 1918 (aged 64) Manhattan, New York, United States
- Buried: Spanish and Portuguese Congregation Cemetery, Montreal
- Spouse: Katherine Samuel (m. 1887)
- Parent: Abraham de Sola (father)

Religious life
- Religion: Judaism
- Denomination: Orthodox Judaism

Jewish leader
- Predecessor: Abraham de Sola
- Successor: Raphael H. Melamed
- Position: Rabbi
- Synagogue: Congregation Shearith Israel
- Began: 1882
- Ended: 1918

Aaron David Meldola de Sola (Hebrew: אהרן דוד מלדולא די סולה; 22 November 1853 – 29 April 1918) was the first native-born Canadian rabbi. He succeeded his father Abraham de Sola as leader of the Shearith Israel synagogue in Montreal upon the latter's death in 1882.

== Biography ==
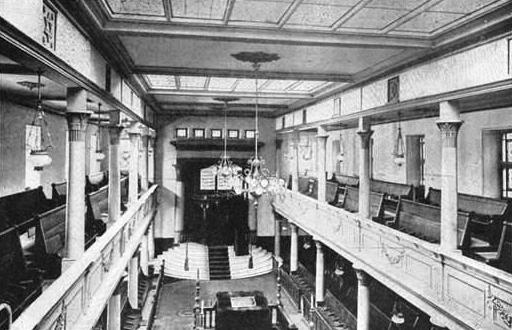
Interior of Shearith Israel

Meldola de Sola was born in Montreal in 1853, the eldest son of Esther (née Joseph) and Rabbi Abraham de Sola. His rabbinical studies were pursued chiefly under the direction of his father, whose assistant he became in 1876. He was elected as his father's successor in 1882. On a number of occasions he was invited to deliver sermons at the Congregation Shearith Israel in New York and Bevis Marks Synagogue in London.

He was appointed the first vice-president of the Orthodox Convention in New York in 1898, and he was one of the committee of three that drew up its "Declaration of Principles". At the conventions held in 1900 and 1903, he was elected first vice-president of the Union of Orthodox Jewish Congregations of the United States and Canada, and chairman of the Committee on Presentations of Judaism.

De Sola published a large number of pamphlets on Jewish subjects, as well as articles in newspapers and magazines. He wrote voluminously in the Jewish press in defense of Orthodox Judaism, and was a vocal critic of the Reform movement. In 1902 he issued a protest against the Central Conference of American Rabbis for discussing the transfer of the Sabbath to the first day of the week. De Sola was also outspoken against Christian missionary activities, and a strong supporter of the Zionist movement.

== Personal life ==
On 3 August 1887, de Sola married Katherine (Katie) Samuel, daughter of the Rev. Isaac Samuel, long-time ḥazzan of the Bayswater Synagogue in London. She would go on to serve as President of the Montreal branch of the National Council of Jewish Women, and Vice-President and Treasurer of the Montreal branch of the National Council of Women of Canada. Together they had two children, Abraham (Bram) Charles and Elizabeth Louisa.

== Publications ==
- The Death of the Righteous: Oration Delivered by Revd. M. de Sola at the Funeral of the Late Abraham Joseph, 22nd March, 1886. Montreal: s.n. 1886.
- The Duty of Orthodox Congregations: A Sermon Preached Before the Congregation "Shearith Israel," New York, in the Synagogue, West Nineteenth Street, on Sabbath Shemoth, Tebeth 23rd, 5648. New York: s.n. 1887.
- "Sermon and Dedicatory Prayer". Order of Service for the Consecration of the New Stanley Street Synagogue on Elul 15th, 5650. s.n. 1890.
- "The Survival of the Fittest": A Sermon Delivered in the Spanish & Portuguese Synagogue, Bevis Marks, London, on Shabbat naḥamu, Saturday, August 3rd, 5655/1895. London: Wertheimer, Lea and Co. 1895. hdl:2027/uc2.ark:/13960/t72v2gf1t.
- Ceremonialism and Idealism: A Sermon Delivered in the Nineteenth Street Synagogue, New York, on Sabbath P. Va'era (Tebeth 28, 5657). New York: Hebrew Standard. 1897.
- The Pulpit: Address by Rev. Meldola de Sola, of Montreal, at the First Evening Session of the Orthodox Conference. New York: s.n. 1898.
- Zionism: A Sermon Delivered by the Rev. Meldola de Sola, of Montreal, on the Seventh Day of Passover, 5660. s.n. 1900.
- Jewish Ministers? An Arraignment of American Reform Judaism. New York: Schoen & Kellerman. 1905. hdl:2027/uc1.a0008747644.
