= Jinwan Media Group =

Chinese media company

- Industry: News media
- Founded: 2005
- Headquarters: Tianjin, China
- Products: Jinwanbao
- Website: www.jinwanbao.cn

Jinwan Media Group (Chinese: 今晚传媒集团) is a Chinese media company based in Tianjin, China. It owns five newspapers, three journals, and one website. Its subsidiary Jinwanbao (Chinese: 今晚报; or Tianjin Today Evening News), established in 1984, is a major newspaper published in China, with daily circulation exceeding 700,000 as of 2006. Bohai Morning News (渤海早报) and Zhonglaonian Times (中老年时报) were awarded Top Ten Chinese Media Brands in 2013.
