= Abraham Pereira Mendes =

Jamaican rabbi and educator

Rev. Abraham Pereira Mendes
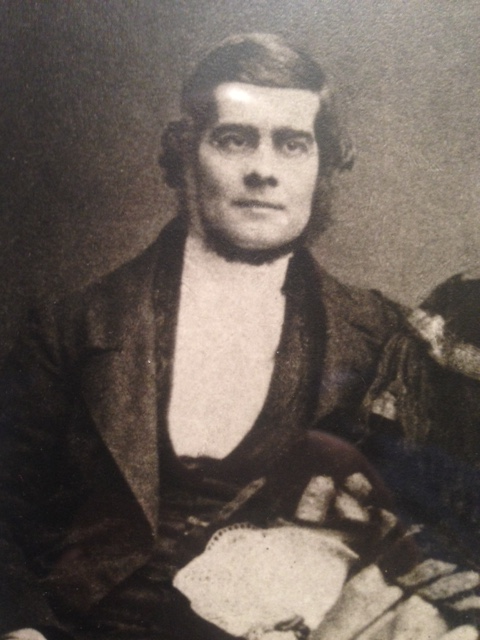
- Abraham Pereira Mendes (unknown date)

Personal life
- Born: 1825-02-9 Kingston, Jamaica
- Died: 1893-4-18 New York City, United States
- Spouse: Eliza Meldola de Sola
- Children: Henry Pereira Mendes (1852–1937), Frederick de Sola Mendes (1850–1927), David de Sola Mendes (1860–1932)
- Parent(s): Isaac Pereira Mendes (1794-1876), Rebecca Campos (1795-1830)
- Occupation: • Rabbi

Religious life
- Religion: Judaism
- Synagogue: Montego Bay, Jamaica; Birmingham, England; Touro Synagogue in Newport, Rhode Island
- Position: Rabbi

Abraham Pereira Mendes (February 9, 1825 in Kingston, Jamaica – April 18, 1893 in New York City) was a Jamaican rabbi and educator. He served in Jamaica, England, and the USA.

He was the first master of the Beth Limud School of Kingston, but resigned in order to prepare in London, England for the vocation of preacher and rabbi. He studied under Dr. David Meldola, son of Haham Raphael Meldola, as well as under his future father-in-law, the Rev. D. A. de Sola, known as "the learned Hazzan" of the Sephardic community, and received his diplomas.

He returned to Jamaica and became for a short time assistant to the Rev. Isaac Lopez, minister of the Kingston Sephardic congregation, but was soon called from that position to be the minister of the Montego Bay community. There he stayed until his wife's failing health compelled him, in 1851, to return to her milder native climate. Mendes was then elected minister and preacher in the Birmingham (Eng.) congregation, and remained there until 1858, when he moved to London, became head of the Neveh Zedek for six years, and established Northwick College, a school for Jewish youth in Maida Hill. He continued meanwhile his ministerial duties and literary labors, and on the death of Haham Artom acted as preacher and dayan for the Sephardic community of London.

In 1883, he was called to the ministry at the historic Touro Synagogue in Newport, Rhode Island, by the guardian Congregation Shearith Israel of New York and continued as its minister until his death ten years later.

He was the first among the Sephardim to publish a volume of sermons in English (1855). He translated the Daily Prayer-Book of the German Jews (Valentine's edition), and finished the translation of the Festival and Holy Day Books left incomplete by the death of Rev. D. A. de Sola. He published, besides, The Law of Moses, Post-Biblical History of the Jews (to fall of Jerusalem), Interlineary Translation of the Prayer-Book (German), and the Haggadah. He married Eliza, a daughter of Rev. D. A. de Sola of London.

Two of Mendes's sons, Frederick de Sola Mendes and Henry Pereira Mendes, became prominent American rabbis in the late nineteenth century.

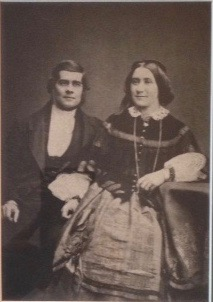
Eliza Meldola de Sola, wife of Abraham Pereira Mendes - Wedding Portrait
