= Henry Pereira Mendes =

American rabbi (1852-1937)

Rev. Dr. Henry Pereira Mendes
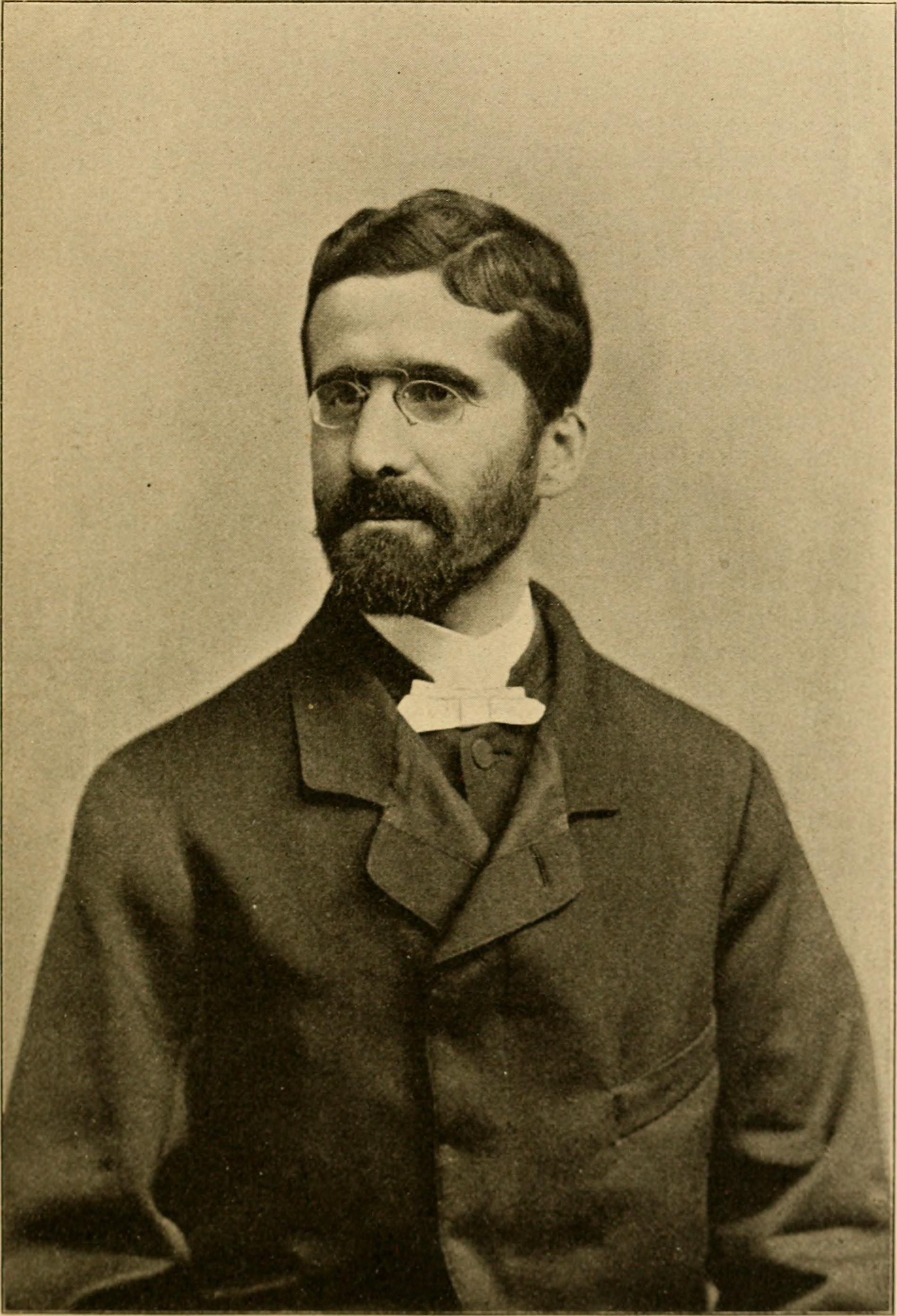
- Mendes, c. 1893

Personal life
- Born: April 13, 1852 Birmingham, United Kingdom
- Died: October 21, 1937 (Age 85) Mount Vernon, New York
- Spouse: Rosalie Rebecca Piza
- Children: Abraham Piza Mendes, Heber Piza Mendes, Samuel Pereira Mendes
- Parent(s): Abraham Pereira Mendes, Eliza de Sola
- Education: Northwick College (Rabbinics); University College, London; New York University (M.D.)
- Occupation: • Rabbi
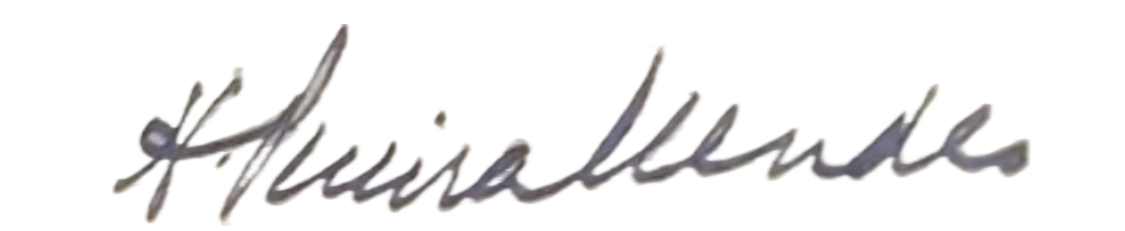
- Signature

Religious life
- Religion: Judaism

Jewish leader
- Predecessor: Jacques Judah Lyons
- Successor: David de Sola Pool
- Position: Rabbi
- Synagogue: Congregation Shearith Israel; New York City, New York, United States
- Began: 1877
- Ended: 1937

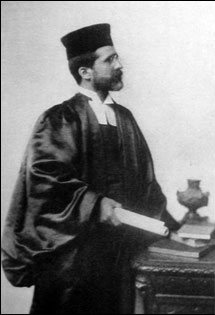
H. Pereira Mendes (unknown date)

Henry Pereira Mendes (Hebrew: חיים פריירה מנדס, 13 April 1852 – 21 October 1937), was an American rabbi who was born in Birmingham, England and died in New York City. He was also known as Haim Pereira Mendes.

== Family history and education ==
Henry Pereira Mendes was born into an old Spanish & Portuguese rabbinic family that settled in Jamaica West Indies in the early 1700's. His father Abraham Pereira Mendes was Rabbi in Kingston and Montego Bay, Jamaica, Birmingham, England, and the Touro Synagogue in Newport, Rhode Island. His grandfather David Aaron de Sola was the Rabbi at Bevis Marks Synagogue in London, and his great-grandfather Raphael Meldola was the Chief Sephardic Rabbi of London. In addition, his brother Frederick de Sola Mendes also served as a rabbi in New York.

He was educated at Northwick College (rabbinics), at University College (London). In addition, he studied and graduated from the medical school of New York University, taking the degree of M.D. (1884). The degree of D.D. was conferred upon him by the Jewish Theological Seminary of America (1904).

On October 15, 1890, Henry married Rosalie Rebecca Piza, daughter of Samuel and Rachel Piza of St. Thomas, Danish West Indies.

== Rabbinic career ==
In 1874, Rev. Mendes became Minister of the newly formed Sephardic congregation in Manchester, England.

In 1877, he was called to the Congregation Shearith Israel of New York where he served until 1920, retaining the title of Rabbi Emeritus. As his successor, Rabbi David de Sola Pool, described it: "The Rev. Jacques Judah Lyons, the venerable hazan of the congregation, was failing in health, and he passed away on August 13, when Dr. Mendes had been installed for only two and a half months. It was no easy task for the young preacher from abroad to fill the void created by the death of Mr. Lyons, who was bound to the congregation by almost forty years....But Dr. Mendes loyally continued the traditions....It is impossible to record the untiring affectionate personal service which Dr. Mendes at all times gave to the members of his congregation in joy and in sorrow...an inspiration to the bride and bridegroom under the canopy, and a stay of strength to those stricken by bereavement. He was a spiritual father to two generations in his congregation. However occupied or weary he might be, no call ever found him other than ready to respond."

In addition, to synagogue duties, Rev. Mendes served as professor of homiletics at Yeshiva Isaac Elchanan from 1917 to 1920.

After retiring in 1920, he traveled for four years through Europe and South America. During that time, he reconnected with his first congregation in Manchester, and assisted them with Hebrew school curricula. In addition, he spent some time in St. Thomas, reviving the S&P community there and leading services.

== Musical contributions ==
Rev. Mendes also made musical contributions to the congregation. As Jewish music scholar Neil W. Levin explains: "Mendes also composed settings for the hazzan and choir of Shearith Israel, judiciously retaining the stylistic continuity of the Amsterdam Sephardi musical tradition and preserving its unique aura and melodic character, and some of these settings earned a place in the congregation's permanent standard repertoire. Such is the case with his setting of uv’nukho yomar, sung to this day at the conclusion of the Torah service after the Torah scrolls have been replaced in the ark, and his setting of Psalm 23."

== Shooting ==
On March 5, 1892, he was shot in the abdomen at his home by a beggar named Jose Mizrachee, narrowly escaping with his life. Years later, at the man's passing, Dr. Mendes paid for his funeral and ensured a proper Jewish burial.

== Organizational activities ==
During his long career, Dr. Mendes participated in the establishment of a number of organizations for the betterment of both Jews and non-Jews:

- New York Board of Ministers - In 1881, he was one of the founders of the New York Board of Ministers and acted as its secretary from its foundation up to 1901 when he became president.
- Jewish Theological Seminary - In 1886, Rev. Mendes joined Sabato Morais in helping to establish the Jewish Theological Seminary, of which he became secretary of the advisory board and professor of history. On the death of Dr. Morais, he became acting president of the faculty until the appointment of Solomon Schechter in 1902.
- Montefiore Home - In 1884, the centennial of the birth of Sir Moses Montefiore, Rev. Mendes moved his congregation to convene the leading Jews of New York to mark the event by some practical work. The outcome was the Montefiore Home for Chronic Invalids, established in the same year—and which later became Montefiore Medical Center.
- Guild for Crippled Children - In 1896, he was made vice-president of the Guild for Crippled Children, and in 1901 established the Jewish branch of that guild.
- Orthodox Union - He promoted the formation of the Union of Orthodox Congregations of the United States and Canada (1898) and was subsequently elected its president.
- Young Women's Hebrew Association - He was also one of the founders of the Young Women's Hebrew Association of New York (1902).

== Zionism ==
Rev. Mendes was an ardent voice in the striving for a Jewish homeland. He was asked by Theodor Herzl to spread the Zionist cause in America and became one of the founders of the Federation of American Zionists, serving as its president. He was also a member of the Actions Committee of Vienna (1898–99).

As he recalls: "Soon after Dr. Herzl began his great movement, Dr. Gaster, chief rabbi of the Spanish & Portuguese community of England, called upon me in London where I was visiting, saying that Dr. Herzl wished to meet me. They both called the next day and Dr. Herzl asked me if I would undertake to introduce the Zionist movement in the United States. I readily and eagerly consented. Upon my return to the States, I formed the first Zionist association....My interest in Zionism has never been diminished." (Jewish Daily Bulletin, May 24, 1934)

Dr. Mendes saw the establishment of a Jewish homeland as not just a physical goal but also a spiritual one. As he declared at a Zionist rally in Atlantic City in 1933, "Besides upbuilding Palestine, we must promote the ... promulgation of Bible ideals, such as the Brotherhood of Man, the End of War....We Jews must be an element making for good citizenship...we must make the name of the Jew respected....Our destiny is to be altruistic, 'to be a blessing'....There should be on Zion a spiritual center to teach the world the three great R's: Reverence, Righteousness, Responsibility." (Jewish Telegraph Agency, February 10, 1933)

Following are some of his writings on the issue:

- "The Solution of Zionism," The North American Review, 1 Aug 1895 https://archive.org/details/jstor-25103563
- "Zionism," The North American Review, 1 Jan 1897 https://archive.org/details/jstor-25119049
- "The Zionist Conference in Basle, Notes and Comments," The North American Review, 1 Nov 1898 https://archive.org/details/jstor-25119100
- "The Hague Conference and Palestine," The North American Review, 7 Sept 1906 https://archive.org/details/jstor-25105623
- "The Rejuvenation of the Jew," The North American Review, 1 Jan 1897 https://archive.org/details/jstor-25118900

== Books and articles ==
Rev. Mendes authored books on a wide range of topics: Judaism, history, current affairs, and even fiction—always with an ethical message. In addition, he was a prolific contributor to various journals. Together with his brother Frederick de Sola Mendes and others, he was one of the founders of "The American Hebrew" (1879). He wrote as well for the North American Review. Following is a partial list of his writings:

=== Judaism ===
- Union Primer and Reading Book (1882)
- Jewish History, Ethically Presented (1895) https://archive.org/details/jewishhistoryeth00mendiala
- The Jewish Religion, Ethically Presented (1904) https://archive.org/details/jewishreligionet00mendiala
- Jewish Daily Life, Ethically Presented (1917, later published as Ruach Hayim (the Spirit of Life), Or, Jewish Daily Life Ethically Presented, 191 pages)
- Bar-Mitzvah for Boyhood, Youth and Manhood

=== History and Current Affairs ===
- "The Lifting of the Veil: Introductory Lecture on Jewish History and Literature," 1898 https://archive.org/details/liftingofveilint00mendiala
- "Looking Ahead: 20th Century Happenings" (1899) https://archive.org/details/lookingaheadtwen00mend

=== Fiction ===
- The Earl of Beaconsfield, Keys to the Famous Characters (1904) https://archive.org/details/TheEarlOfBeaconsfield
- Esther and Harbonah (a play in three acts) https://archive.org/details/estherharbonah00mend
- In Old Egypt: A Story about the Bible but not in the Bible
- Judas Maccabaeus: A Chanuka play for Sunday school children, 1898

== Death ==
Rabbi Mendes continued to be active as an author and orator in his later years, and was in good health until suffering a heart attack a week before his death. He died in his home in Mount Vernon, New York on October 20, 1937 and was buried in Beth Olam Cemetery in Cypress Hills, Queens.

== References and further reading ==
- de Sola Pool, David, H. Pereira Mendes: A Biography, 1938.
- "The Religious Vision of Rev. Dr. Henry Pereira Mendes" by Rabbi Marc D. Angel https://www.jewishideas.org/article/religious-vision-rev-dr-henry-pereira-mendes
- "Reverend Henry Pereira Mendes: Orthodox Stalwart" by Dr. Yitzchok Levine https://www.ou.org/life/community/reverend-henry-pereira-mendes-orthodox-stalwart-part/
- "Reverend Henry Pereira Mendes: Man of Chesed" by Dr. Yitzchok Levine https://www.ou.org/life/community/reverend-henry-pereira-mendes-man-chesed-part-ii/
- "Reverend Henry Pereira Mendes: Safeguarding Orthodox Judaism" by Dr. Yitzchok Levine https://www.ou.org/life/community/reverend-henry-pereira-mendes-safeguarding-orthodox-judaism-part-iii/
- "The Biblical Zionism of Rabbi Dr. Henry Pereira Mendes" by Dr Murray Mizrachi https://www.facebook.com/notes/sephardi-ideas-monthly/the-biblical-zionism-of-rabbi-dr-henry-pereira-mendes/1448880361971449/?mc_cid=3108f624ef&mc_eid=8574f7026e
