= Ma'amad =

Council of Elders of Sephardi Jews

Ma'amad or Mahamad (Hebrew: מעמד) is the Council of Elders (or "the board of directors") of the communities of Sephardi Jews (Spanish-Portuguese Jews) corresponding to qahal of the Ashkenazi Jews. Ma'amad was described as conservative and authoritarian.

In Talmud (Ta'an. 15b:3), the term referred to the "members of the priestly watch" in charge of the Temple service.

The Council consisted of four wardens (parnassim) and a treasurer (gabbai), and its members were elected from the yeḥidim, those who had full membership rights in the synagogue.

The ma'amad of the Spanish-Portuguese of London was satirized by Israel Zangwill in The King of Schnorrers, Chapter 5 "Showing How the King Dissolved the Mahamad". This is how Zangwill describes the absolute powers of ma'amad: "A Sephardic Jew lived and moved and had his being 'by permission of the Mahamad'. Without its consent he could have no legitimate place in the scheme of things....He might, indeed, die without the sanction of the Council of Five, but this was the only great act of his life which was free from its surveillance, and he could certainly not be buried save 'by permission of the Mahamad'.
