= David de Aaron de Sola =

Dutch-British rabbi (1796–1860)

Rev. David Aaron de Sola
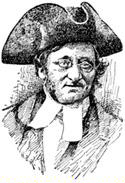
- Rev. David Aaron de Sola

Personal life
- Born: 26 December 1796 Amsterdam, Netherlands
- Died: 29 October 1860 (aged 63) London, England
- Spouse: Rica/Rebecca de Hezekiah Meldola
- Children: Six sons, nine daughters
- Parent: Aaron de Sola
- Occupation: • Rabbi

Religious life
- Religion: Judaism

Jewish leader
- Predecessor: Raphael Medola
- Synagogue: Bevis Marks Synagogue; London
- Position: Rabbi
- Began: 1818
- Ended: 1860

David de Aaron de Sola or David Aaron de Sola (1796–1860) (Hebrew: דוד אהרן די סולה) was a rabbi and author, born in Amsterdam, the son of Aaron de Sola.

== Family history and education ==
David Aaron De Sola was descended from a distinguished family of Sephardim, who emigrated from Spain in 1492 on the expulsion of the Jews from that country by Ferdinand and Isabella. The family seems to have settled mainly in Holland and includes, among others, the preacher Isaac de Sola (1675–1735) and Dr. Benjamin de Sola (1735–1816), who served as court physician to William, Prince of Orange.

At just eleven years of age, David Aaron de Sola entered as a student to the bet ha-midrash in Amsterdam, studying diligently, and after a course of nine years received his rabbinical diploma from Haham d'Azevdo of Amsterdam who stated that de Sola was "to the fullest extent competent to discharge rabbinical functions...and assume the ministerial office in every city."

He also engaged in secular studies. In addition to the Spanish and Portuguese languages, which were spoken at home, he read both German and French literature. Moreover, he studied mathematics and astronomy, and his great-uncle, Dr. Benjamin de Sola, introduced him to medicine. He became proficient in drawing, sketching, and music as well.

== Rabbinic career ==
In 1818, D.A. de Sola was called to London to become one of the ministers of the Bevis Marks Congregation under Haham Raphael Meldola (who would also later become his father-in-law). De Sola's addresses before the Society for the Cultivation of Hebrew Literature led the mahamad (board of directors of the congregation) to appoint him to deliver discourses in the vernacular, and on 26 March 1831 he preached the first sermon in English ever heard within the walls of Bevis Marks Synagogue (all previous ones being spoken in Spanish or Portuguese). His discourses were subsequently published by the mahamad. Of his style, one observer wrote: "Though a scholar and a thinker, yet he...used the most unpedantic terms and assumed a quiet, colloquial manner."

== Publications ==
D.A. de Sola's most significant work was the publication in 1836 and again in 1852 of the prayer book, Translation of the Forms of Prayer According to the Custom of the Spanish and Portuguese Jews. This undertaking, which received the encouragement and financial support of Sir Moses Montefiore, "was a remarkable feat of scholarship" and formed the basis for several subsequent editions. Other writings by D.A. de Sola include:

In 1829, he issued his first work, The Blessings, with an introductory essay on the nature and duty of thanksgiving.

In 1837, de Sola published The Proper Names in Scripture; about the same time he wrote Moses the Prophet, Moses Maimonides, and Moses Mendelssohn, and in 1838 Notes on Basnage and Milman's History of the Jews.

In 1839, collaborating with M. J. Raphall, he translated eighteen treatises of the Mishnah. The work had a strange fate, for, the manuscript having reached the hands of a member of the Burton Street Synagogue, it was published in 1842, without the permission of the authors, before it had been revised or corrected for the press, and with an anonymous preface expressing views entirely opposed to those of de Sola and Raphall.

In 1840 de Sola, conjointly with Raphall, began the publication of an English translation of the Scriptures, together with a commentary. Only the first volume, Genesis, was published, in 1844.

In 1860, he translated into English, in four volumes, the festival prayers according to the custom of the German and Polish Jews.

Besides his works in English, de Sola wrote in Hebrew, German, and Dutch. He contributed frequently between 1836 and 1845 to the Allgemeine Zeitung des Judenthums and to Der Orient, and published in German A Biography of Ephraim Luzzato and a Biography of Distinguished Israelites in England. His chief work in Dutch was his Biography of Isaac Samuel Reggio, published in 1855 and afterward translated into English.

== Organizational activities ==
De Sola was instrumental in organizing the Association for the Promotion of Jewish Literature and other societies of a similar character.

== Musical contributions ==
D.A. de Sola had a lifelong passion for music. As his son Abraham relates, "nature had gifted him with a fine ear and a most melodious voice." In 1857, he published The Ancient Melodies of the Spanish and Portuguese Jews, including a historical account of the poets, poetry, and melodies of the Sephardic liturgy. In the notation of the melodies he was assisted by Emanuel Aguilar, the composer.

Additionally, de Sola composed this melody for Adon Olam that is still used in both Sephardi and Ashkenazi synagogues in the United Kingdom and elsewhere.

Musicality continued into the next generation. One of his sons, Samuel de Sola, composed this melody for Yigdal, which is still sung in some S&P congregations.

== Family life ==
De Sola was married in 1819 to Rica/Rebecca de Hezekiah Meldola (born Amsterdam 1796 died London 1866, eldest daughter of Haham Raphael Meldola, who was born in Florence and was also accomplished in her study of religion and languages. They had a fruitful marriage, producing six sons and nine daughters.

Among the sons was Rabbi Abraham de Sola, who served as minister at the Spanish and Portuguese Synagogue of Montreal and Samuel de Sola, who in 1863 was elected to succeed his father as minister of the Bevis Marks. One daughter, Jael, married Solomon Belais, son of Rabbi Abraham Belais, at one time treasurer to the Bey of Tunis. Another daughter, Eliza, married Rev. Abraham Pereira Mendes and was the mother of Rabbi Dr. Frederick de Sola Mendes and Rabbi Dr. Henry Pereira Mendes.

Of the other daughters, five married in London, one being Annette Hannah de Sola born 1827, London and who married in London in 1863 Maurice Moses Cohen Rogers born 1831 in Leeuwarden. Their grandson Dr Keith Bernard de Sola Rogers, was part of an illustrious team at St Mary's concerned with immunology, early blood transfusions, development of sulphonamides, and, above all, penicillin.

David de Sola died at Shadwell, near London, in 1860.
