= National Jewish Welfare Board =

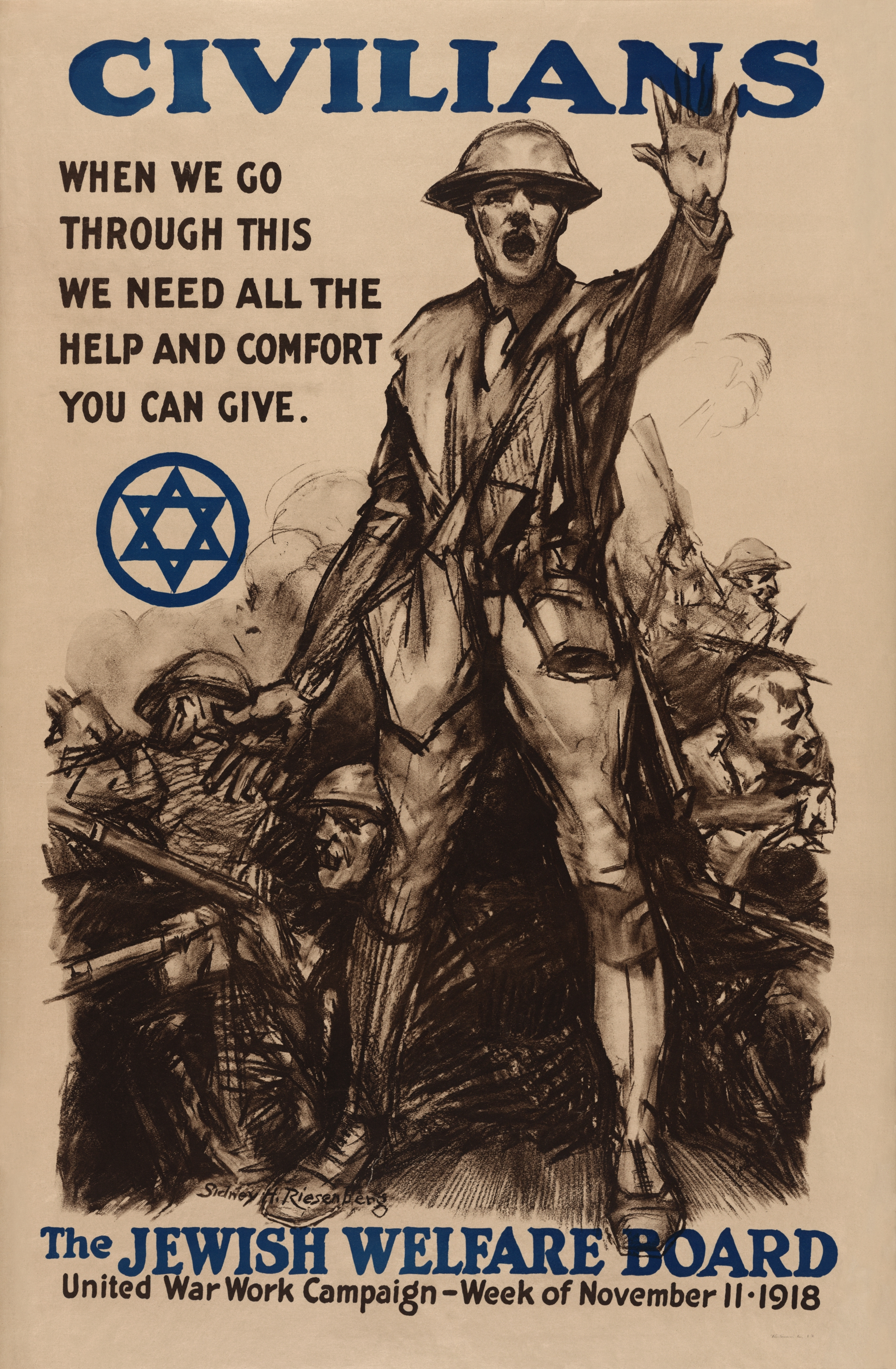
Jewish Welfare Board poster, New York, 1918.

The National Jewish Welfare Board (JWB) was formed on April 9, 1917, three days after the United States declared war on Germany, in order to support Jewish soldiers in the U.S. military during World War I. The impetus for creating the organization stemmed from Secretary of War, Newton Baker and Secretary of Navy, Josephus Daniels. The organization was also charged with recruiting and training rabbis for military service, as well as providing support materials to these newly commissioned chaplains. The JWB also maintained oversight of Jewish chapel facilities at military installations.

== History ==
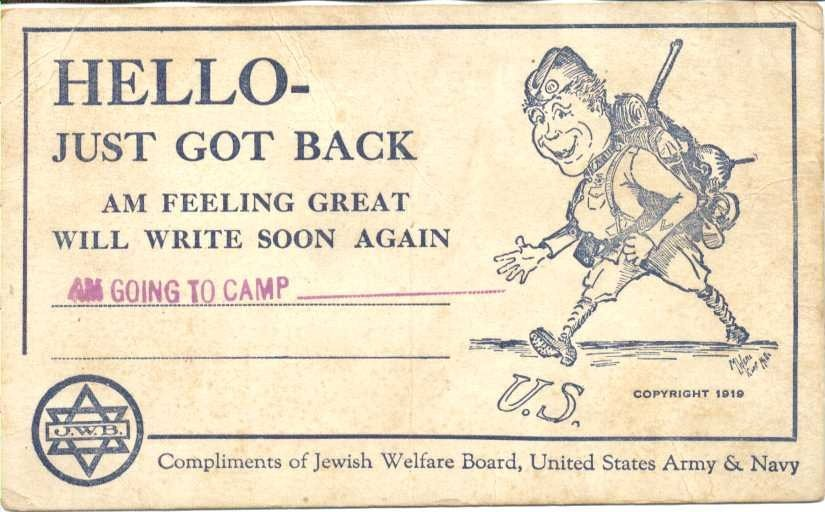
Postcard, 1919

In 1921, several organizations merged with the JWB to become a national association of Jewish community centers around the country in order to integrate social activities, education, and active recreation. These merged organizations included the YWHA, YMHA, and the National Council of Young Men's Hebrew and Kindred Association.

In 1941, the United Service Organizations for National Defense was brought into existence through Presidential order February 4. The USO was incorporated in New York state as a private, nonprofit organization, supported by private citizens and corporations. President Franklin D. Roosevelt wanted the morale of military personnel to remain high and believed that current service organizations would be better suited for the job than the Department of Defense. The six private organizations were - the National Catholic Community Service (NCCS), Young Men's Christian Association YMCA, Young Women's Christian Association YWCA, the National Jewish Welfare Board (NJWB), the Traveler's Aid Association and the Salvation Army. These organizations were challenged to handle the on-leave morale and recreational needs for members of the Armed Forces. The six organizations pooled their resources and the United Service Organizations, which quickly became known as the USO, was incorporated in New York on February 4, 1941.

In 1942 the NJWB established the National Jewish Music Council; a sub-organization of the NJWB whose purpose was to promote cultural programming, publish literature, and produce recordings on subjects related to music of the Jewish people. The organization presented an annual Jewish Music Festival in addition to sponsoring other events such as performances and lectures. The organization also produced recordings of Jewish music and published biographies, handbooks, and other scholarly materials.

In the 1950s, during the Second Red Scare, the NJWB encouraged Jewish community centers to ban radical Jewish speakers from using their facilities. The Jewish Young Fraternalists, the youth arm of the communist Jewish People's Fraternal Order, was expelled in 1953 from the National Jewish Youth Conference, an organization sponsored by the NJWB.

The organization is now the JWB Jewish Chaplains Council, part of JCC Association of North America. The Council sends religious artifacts and supplies for Jewish holidays, including Passover Seder kits, Hanukkah candles, four species for Tabernacles, and more.

== Related links ==
- National Jewish Welfare Board Records; I-337; American Jewish Historical Society, Boston, MA and New York, NY.
- National Jewish Welfare Board Records; I-298; American Jewish Historical Society, Boston, MA and New York, NY.
- National Jewish Welfare Board Military Chaplaincy Records; I-249; American Jewish Historical Society, Boston, MA and New York, NY.
- National Jewish Welfare Board, Army-Navy Division Records; I-180; American Jewish Historical Society, Boston, MA and New York, NY.
- National Jewish Welfare Board, Bureau of War Records; I-52; American Jewish Historical Society, Boston, MA and New York, NY.
