= Bayswater Synagogue =

Former synagogue in London, England

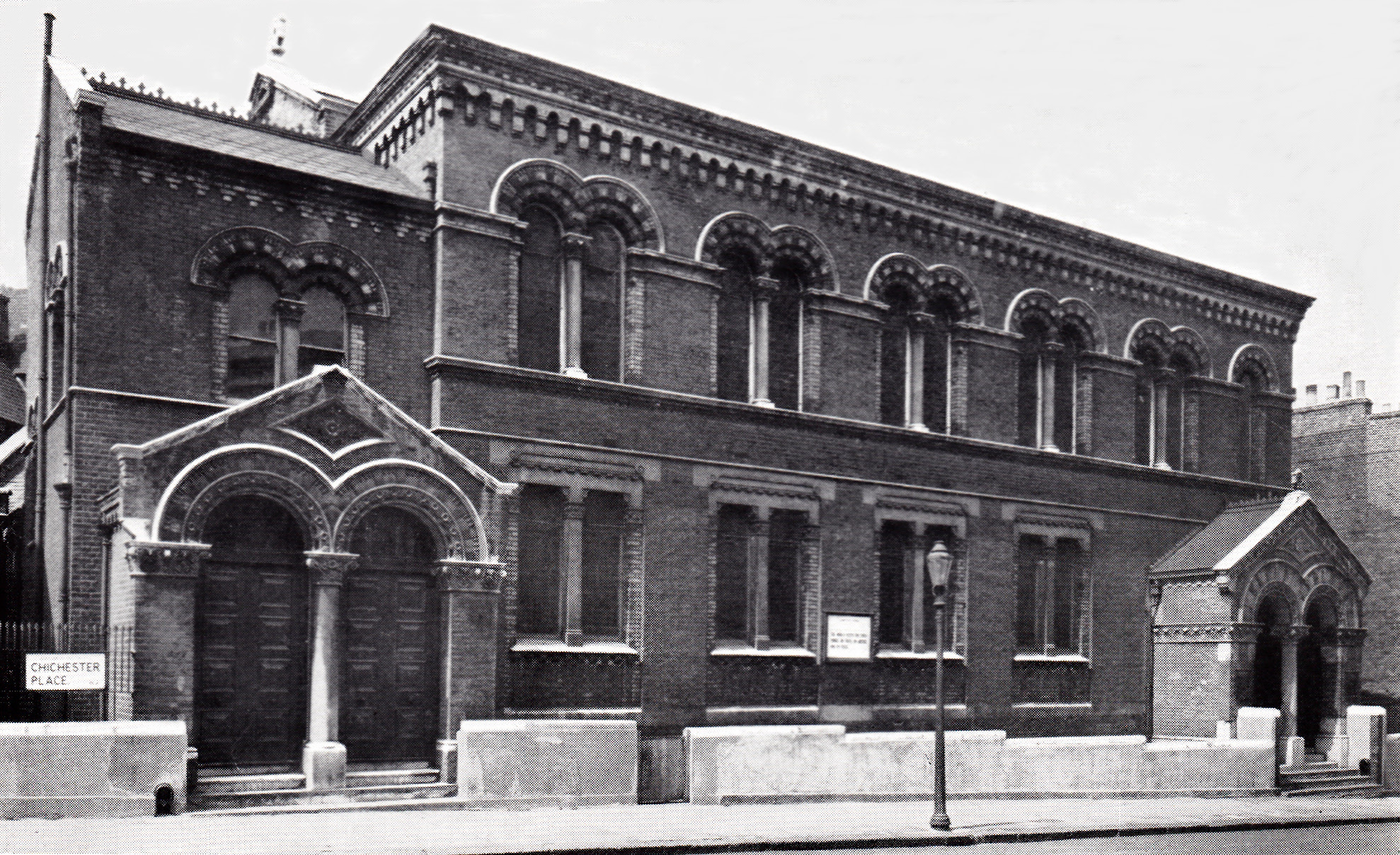
- The former synagogue building

- Location of the former synagogue in the City of Westminster

Religion
- Affiliation: Orthodox Judaism (former)
- Rite: Nusach Ashkenaz
- Ecclesiastical or organisational status: Synagogue (1863–1965)
- Status: Closed; and demolished

Location
- Location: Chichester Place, Paddington, City of Westminster, London, England
- Country: United Kingdom
- Coordinates: 51°31′11″N 0°11′14″W

Architecture
- Established: 1860s (as a congregation)
- Completed: 1863
- Demolished: 1965
- Materials: Brick

Bayswater Synagogue was an Orthodox Jewish congregation and synagogue located in Chichester Place, Paddington, in the City of Westminster, London, England, in the United Kingdom. The congregation worshipped in the Ashkenazi rite.

Built in 1863, as a branch synagogue jointly of the Great Synagogue and the New Synagogue, it was one of the original five synagogues that formed the United Synagogue in 1870. The building was demolished in 1965 for construction of the Westway overpass and the Warwick Estate redevelopment.

== History ==
From about 1820, many Jewish families had joined the westward expansion of London, placing them at an inconvenient distance from established synagogues whose wardens ("the Jewish City Fathers") required them to attend, even to the exclusion of private worship. Agitation commenced for a new synagogue, and "endless negative negotiations ensued between those who had moved into the Bayswater area and the authorities of the City synagogues." Support was gained from Chief Rabbi Nathan Marcus Adler and, after orderly formal proceedings, the Chichester Road site was selected and the foundation stone laid on 10 July 1862. On 21 February 1863 The Illustrated London News published an article on the new synagogue and, on 30 July 1863, the building was consecrated by the Chief Rabbi.

Notable seat holders included the banker Samuel Montagu, later Lord Swaythling (1832- 1911), and members of the Rothschild family.

=== WWII bombing ===
During the Blitz of World War II, the board-room was destroyed by Luftwaffe bombing, with the loss of a portrait gallery of 19th-century communal leaders. On the same night (10 May 1941), both London's Great Synagogue and the 1870 Central Synagogue were also destroyed.

== Demolition ==
The synagogue was closed and demolished in 1965 as part of the construction of the Westway elevated road. The congregation moved to the Lauderdale Road synagogue in Maida Vale.

== Notable rabbis ==
- Dr Hermann Adler CVO, from 1864 to 1891; later served as Chief Rabbi of the UK
- Raymond Apple AO, from 1960 until its closure in 1965
- Sir Hermann Gollancz, from 1892 to 1922

== See also ==
- History of the Jews in England
- List of former synagogues in the United Kingdom
