= Frederick de Sola Mendes =

Rabbi Frederick de Sola Mendes
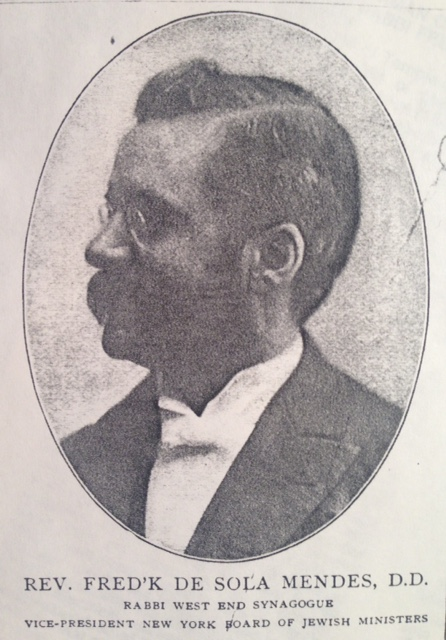

Personal life
- Born: 8 July 1850 Montego Bay, Jamaica
- Died: 26 October 1927 (aged 77) New Rochelle, New York, United States
- Spouse: Isabel Francis Mendes
- Children: Irma DeSola Steinhardt, Arthur de Sola Mendes, David Martin Mendes, Jesse de Sola Mendes, Alma Levine, Vera de Sola Goodman, and Nina de Sola Mendes
- Parent(s): Abraham Pereira Mendes, Eliza de Sola
- Occupation: Rabbi

Religious life
- Religion: Judaism

Jewish leader
- Position: Rabbi
- Synagogue: West End Synagogue, Congregation Shaaray Tefillah, New York

Frederick de Sola Mendes (July 8, 1850 – October 26, 1927) was a rabbi, author, and editor.

== Family history and education ==
Frederick de Sola Mendes was born into an old Spanish & Portuguese rabbinic family. He was the son of Rabbi Abraham Pereira Mendes, grandson of Rabbi David Aaron de Sola, and great-grandson of Haham Raphael Meldola. He was also brother of Rabbi Henry Pereira Mendes. He was educated at Northwick College and at University College School, London, and at the University of London (B.A. 1869). Subsequently, he went to Breslau, Germany, where he entered the university and studied rabbinics at the Jewish Theological Seminary of Breslau. Mendes received the degree of Ph.D. from Jena University in 1871.

== Rabbinic career ==
Returning to England, he was licensed to preach as rabbi by Haham Benjamin Artom, in London, 1873; in the same year he was appointed preacher of the Great St. Helen's Synagogue of that city, but in December removed to New York, where he had accepted a call to the rabbinate of Shaaray Tefillah congregation (now the West End Synagogue); he entered upon his duties there January 1, 1874 as assistant minister to Rabbi Samuel M. Isaacs. In 1877, Mendes was elected rabbi of the congregation and continued in that position until 1920 when he retired as Rabbi Emeritus.

== Writings ==
Mendes achieved a great reputation for scholarship and writing power. In conjunction with his brother Henry Pereira Mendes and others, he was one of the founders of the American Hebrew and was its editor during the first six years (1879-1885). In 1888, he took part in the Field-Ingersoll controversy, writing for the North American Review an article entitled "In Defense of Jehovah." In 1900, Mendes joined the staff of the Jewish Encyclopedia as revising editor and chief of the translation bureau, which positions he resigned in September 1902. Along with Marcus Jastrow and Kaufmann Kohler, Frederick de Sola Mendes was one of the revisers of the Jewish Publication Society of America Version of the Bible. He also translated Jewish Family Papers: Letters of a Missionary, by "Gustav Meinhardt" (William Herzberg). Of his publications the following may be mentioned: Child's First Bible; Outlines of Bible History; and Defense not Defiance. He contributed also the article on the "Jews" to Johnson's Encyclopedia. In 1903, he became for a time editor of The Menorah, a monthly magazine.
