= History of the Jews in Colonial America =

The history of the Jews in Colonial America begins upon their arrival as early as the 1650s. The first Jews who came to the New World were Sephardi Jews who arrived in New Amsterdam (New York City). Later major settlements of Jews would occur in the port cities: Newport, Philadelphia, Charleston, and Savannah.

The Jewish settlers immediately faced discrimination, similar to and often more intense than that suffered by other religions, Catholics, Lutherans, and Quakers. The Jewish settlers played a role in the trading business of the colonies, but were often faced with anti-Jewish discrimination from both governmental entities and individuals.

== Early individual arrivals ==
=== Joachim Gans ===
Joachim Gans was a Bohemian-German Jew born in Prague, Kingdom of Bohemia. Gans was a renowned metallurgist and mining expert, who was recruited by Sir Walter Raleigh for the 1585 expedition to found a permanent settlement in the Virginia territory, which became the Roanoke Colony.

=== Elias Legarde ===
Elias Legarde (or Legardo) may have been a Sephardic Jew who arrived at Jamestown, Virginia on the merchant ship Abigail in 1621. Legarde appears in the muster of Anthonie Bonall. Legarde was from Languedoc, France, and was hired to go to the colony to teach people how to grow grapes for wine. In 1628 Legarde leased 100 acres on the west side of Harris Creek in Elizabeth City, Colony of Virginia.

=== Solomon Franco ===
One of the first Jews known to have lived in northern North America was Solomon Franco, a Sephardic Jew from Holland who is believed to have settled in Boston in the Massachusetts Bay Colony in 1649. Franco was a scholar and agent for Immanuel Perada, a Dutch merchant. He delivered supplies to Edward Gibbons, a major general in the Massachusetts militia. After a dispute over who should pay Franco (Gibbons or Perada), the Massachusetts General Court ruled on May 6, 1649, that Franco was to be expelled from the colony and granted him "six shillings per week out of the Treasury for ten weeks, for sustenance, till he can get his passage to Holland."

=== Solomon Pietersen ===
Solomon Pietersen was a merchant from Amsterdam who came to New Amsterdam (in Lower Manhattan, today's New York City) in 1654. In 1656, Pietersen became the first known American Jew to intermarry with a Christian; though there are no records showing Pietersen formally converted, his daughter Anna was baptized in childhood.

=== Jacob Barsimson ===
On July 8, 1654, Jacob Barsimson left Holland and arrived aboard Peartree on August 22 in the port of New Amsterdam (in Lower Manhattan, where Wall Street is today). Barsimson was employed by the Dutch East India Company and had fled the Portuguese settlements in the New World, which had captured a formerly Dutch settlement and established the Portuguese Inquisition there.

=== Asser Levy ===
Asser Levy (Van Swellem) is first mentioned in public records in New Amsterdam in 1654, in connection with the group of 23 Jews who arrived as refugees from Brazil. It is likely he preceded their arrival. Levy was the (kosher) butcher for the small Jewish community. He fought for Jewish rights in the Dutch colony and is famous for having secured the right of Jews to be admitted as Burghers and to serve guard duty for the colony.

== Dutch Brazilian Sephardi group ==
The first group of Jews in the northern colonies disembarked in early September 1654, shortly after Barsimson. Barsimson is said to have met them at The Battery upon their arrival. This group was made up of 23 Portuguese Jews from the Netherlands (4 couples, 2 widows, and 13 children). Like Barsimson, they had fled from a former Dutch settlement; the group had emigrated from Dutch Brazil after the settlement was conquered by the Portuguese. Fearing the Inquisition, the Jews left Recife. They originally docked in Spanish Jamaica and Spanish Cuba, but the Spanish did not allow them to remain there. Their ship, Ste. Catherine, went to New Amsterdam instead, settling against the wishes of local merchants and the local Dutch Reformed Church. Colonial governor Peter Stuyvesant, upon complaint from these groups, attempted to have the Jews expelled. He wrote a letter to the directors of the Dutch West India Company dated September 22, 1654:

The Jews who have arrived would nearly all like to remain here, but learning that they (with their customary usury and deceitful trading with the Christians) were very repugnant to the inferior magistrates, as also to the people having the most affection for you; the Deaconry also fearing that owing to their present indigence they might become a charge in the coming winter, we have, for the benefit of this weak and newly developing place and the land in general, deemed it useful to require them in a friendly way to depart, praying also most seriously in this connection, for ourselves as also for the general community of your worships, that the deceitful race—such hateful enemies and blasphemers of the name of Christ—be not allowed to further infect and trouble this new colony to the detraction of your worships and the dissatisfaction of your worships' most affectionate subjects.

However, the directors of the Dutch West India Company included several influential Jews, who interceded on the refugees' behalf. Company officials rebuffed Stuyvesant and ordered him, in a letter dated April 26, 1655, to let the Jews remain in New Amsterdam, "provided the poor among them shall not become a burden to the company or to the community, but be supported by their own nation":

We would have liked to effectuate and fulfill your wishes and request that the new territories should no more be allowed to be infected by people of the Jewish nation, for we foresee therefrom the same difficulties which you fear, but after having further weighed and considered the matter, we observe that this would be somewhat unreasonable and unfair, especially because of the considerable loss sustained by this nation, with others, in the taking of Brazil, as also because of the large amount of capital which they still have invested in the shares of this company. Therefore after many deliberations we have finally decided and resolved to apostille [annotate] upon a certain petition presented by said Portuguese Jews that these people may travel and trade to and in New Netherland and live and remain there, provided the poor among them shall not become a burden to the company or to the community, but be supported by their own nation. You will now govern yourself accordingly.

Upon the capture of the colony by the English in 1664, the rights enjoyed by the Jews were not interfered with, and for twenty years they appear to have lived much as before the establishment of English rule, though with slight increase in their numbers. Jews had previously been barred from settling in English colonies, as they had been banned from all English territory for 400 years. Oliver Cromwell (British Protector from 1649 through 1660, through his son Richard) lifted this prohibition, and the founding of the first major Jewish settlement soon followed in Newport, Rhode Island. In 1672, Rabba Couty attained prominence with his appeal to the King's Council in England from a decree passed against him by the courts of Jamaica, as a result of which one of his ships was seized and declared forfeited. His appeal was successful and established the rights of Jews as British subjects. This appears to be the first case in which a colonial grant of naturalization was recognized as valid.

== New York ==
In 1685, the application of Saul Brown (originally Saul Pardo) to trade at retail was denied, as was also that of the Jews for liberty to exercise their religion publicly. That they did so privately in a place of worship is evident from a map of New York, dated 1695, which shows the location of a synagogue on Beaver Street, also that Saul Brown was the minister, and that the congregation comprised 20 families. Five years later, the site of the synagogue was so well known that, in a conveyance of property, the premises were referred to as a "landmark." In 1710, the minister of the congregation, Abraham de Lucena, was granted exemption from civil and military service by reason of his ministerial functions, and reference is made to the enjoyment of the same privileges by his predecessors. The minutes of the Congregation Shearith Israel of New York begin in 1729, when it was located on Mill Street, and refer to records dating back as far as 1706. This congregation was established on Mill Street, in 1730, on a lot purchased two years before, the first synagogue in the now United States.

It would thus appear that the religious rights of these early Jewish settlers had been secured in the beginning of the 18th century, and that they enjoyed many political rights. An act passed by the New York General Assembly on November 15, 1727, provided that when the oath of abjuration was to be taken by any British subject professing the Jewish religion, the words "upon the true faith of a Christian" might be omitted. Three days later, an act was passed naturalizing one Daniel Nunes da Costa. A bitter political controversy of 1737 resulted in the decision by the General Assembly that Jews should not be allowed to vote for members of that body.

In 1740, Parliament passed the Plantation Act, specifically permitting Jews to be naturalized in the colonies. Previously, however, the New York Colonial Assembly had passed numerous special acts of naturalization, some of which were applicable to individuals only; others, more general in character, said that Jews could be naturalized without taking oath "upon the true faith of a Christian." Between this time and the Revolutionary War the Jewish community in this colony increased slowly, with immigrants coming mostly from Spain, Portugal, and the West Indies.

During the French and Indian War, Jacob Franks was the royal agent, in association with a British syndicate, for provisioning the British forces in America; his dealings with the crown during this period exceeded £750,000.

== Upstate New York settlement ==
Although most of the earlier immigrants settled in New York City, a few settled beyond its limits, some even as far as the confines of what now constitutes the state of Pennsylvania. In 1661, when Albany was but a trading-post, Asser Levy owned real estate there, but between that date and the early years of the nineteenth century there are no records of any settlers in that town. They were not there in sufficient numbers to form a congregation until 1838, and they had no rabbi until 1846.

== In New England ==
A group of Jews settled in Newport, Rhode Island in the late 1600s due to the official religious tolerance of the colony as established by Roger Williams. In other parts of New England there were probably occasional settlers in the seventeenth and eighteenth centuries, but the intolerance of the Puritans rendered impossible the establishment of any religious communities. According to several sources, Moses Simonson, who settled in Plymouth, Massachusetts in 1621, may have had Dutch Jewish ancestry. An interesting personality is that of Judah Monis, who became a convert to Christianity and filled the chair of Hebrew in Harvard College from 1722 until his death in 1764.

Mention is found of a Jew in Connecticut on November 9, 1659, and of another in 1670. The first Jewish family to settle in New Haven came in 1772, though a few individuals who had become converts to Christianity dwelt there a few years before. The first congregation was established about 1840, the congregants being members of about twenty Bavarian families. From that date on the community increased by slow stages. There are Jewish settlements also in Bridgeport, Ansonia, Derby, Waterbury, New London, and Hartford. The first congregation in Hartford was established in 1843. Since 1891, a number of Jewish farmers have been settled in various parts of the state.

The earliest mention of a Jew in Massachusetts bears the date May 3, 1649, and there are references to Jews among the inhabitants of Boston in 1695 and 1702; but they can be regarded only as stragglers, as no settlers made their homes in Massachusetts until the Revolutionary War drove the Jews from Newport. In 1777, Aaron Lopez and Jacob Rivera, with fifty-nine others, went from Newport to Leicester, and established themselves there; but this settlement did not survive the close of the war. A number of Jews, including the Hays family, settled at Boston before 1800. Of these Moses Michael Hays was the most important. In 1830, a number of Algerian Jews went to Boston, but they soon disappeared. The history of the present community begins with 1840, when the first congregation was established.

The Jewish immigrants to Vermont and New Hampshire have never been very numerous, though there are congregations in Burlington, Vermont and in Manchester, Nashua, Concord, Portsmouth, and Dover, New Hampshire. Little of importance can be said about the communal life of the Jews in New England, and their numbers increased but slowly until after the beginning of the great Russian emigration in 1882, when the overflow from New York as well as the emigration through Canada commenced to stream into New England.

The opening up of the West and the resulting unprofitable nature of farming in New England drew away from this part of the United States many thrifty farmers, who abandoned their unfruitful fields for the more attractive opportunities in the western states. Of interest in connection with this shifting of the population is the fact that many of these abandoned farms, especially in Connecticut, have been taken up by Russian Jews, who, principally as dairy farmers, have added a new and useful element to the agricultural community.

== Maryland ==
It would seem that only a few Jews found their way to Maryland during the first half of the 17th century, and that the first settlers of this colony came as individuals, and not in considerable numbers at any time, as was the case in New York, Newport, Savannah, and Charleston. To judge by the names alone it would appear that a few Jews were resident in Maryland from the earliest days of the colony. The most prominent figure, who was unquestionably a Jew, was a Dr. Jacob Lumbrozo, who had arrived January 24, 1656, and who, in 1658, was tried for blasphemy, but was released by reason of the general amnesty granted in honor of the accession of Richard Cromwell (March 3, 1658). Letters of denization were issued to Lumbrozo September 10, 1663. Besides practising medicine, he also owned a plantation, engaged in trade with the Native Americans, and had active intercourse with London merchants. He was one of the earliest medical practitioners in the colony, and his career casts much light upon the history and nature of religious tolerance in Maryland. By the strength of his personality he was able to disregard nearly all the laws which would have rendered his residence in the colony impossible, and he seems to have observed his faith even though this, under the laws, was forbidden. The unfavorable environment rendered the admittance of Jews to Maryland difficult, and until the Constitution of 1776 established the religious rights of all, few Jews settled in the colony.

== Pennsylvania ==
It is on record that Jews from New Amsterdam traded along the Delaware River as early as 1655. There were probably some settlers in the southeastern portion of the territory of which William Penn took possession in 1681. A very considerable number of the early Pennsylvania colonists were German Jews. The first Jewish resident of Philadelphia was Jonas Aaron, who was living there in 1703. Another early pioneer and one of considerable prominence was Isaac Miranda. He was the first to settle at Lancaster, at which place, as also at Shaefferstown, there was an early Jewish immigration. Miranda became a convert to Christianity and held several state offices. A number of Jews settled in Philadelphia in the first half of the eighteenth century, and became prominent in the life of the city. Among these were David Franks, Joseph Marks, and Sampson Levy. The Non-Importation Resolutions of 1765 contained the signatures of eight Jews, an indication of the importance of the Jewish community at this time. As early as 1747 a number of persons held religious services in a small house in Sterling alley, and afterward in Cherry alley—between Third and Fourth streets. They were mostly German and Polish Jews; and their differences as to the liturgy to be followed prevented, at the time, the formation of any regular congregation. Attempts, indeed, were made in 1761 and 1773 to form one, but none was established until the influx of Jews from New York during the Revolutionary War, with the arrival of Gershom Mendes Seixas, gave the community sufficient strength to carry out this cherished object. A lot was purchased and a synagogue erected, the dedication occurring in September 1782. A number of Philadelphia Jews served in the army of the Revolution; and the inestimable services rendered by Haym Salomon to Robert Morris in the finances of the Revolution make his name stand out as the most prominent character in American Jewry.

Jews have lived in Lancaster, Pennsylvania, since at least 1730, before the town and county were organized. Joseph Simon was the best known of the first arrivals. Meyer Hart and Michael Hart were among the earlier settlers at Easton, where they arrived previous to the Revolutionary War. A synagogue was established there in 1839. Shaefferstown had a few Jewish settlers at an early date, and a synagogue and cemetery in 1732. For a considerable number of years preceding the Revolutionary War a number of Jews of Pennsylvania were engaged in the exploitation and sale of western Pennsylvania lands. Among the more prominent of these were Jacob and David Franks, Barnard and Michael Gratz, Joseph Simon, and Levy Andrew Levy.

== The American South ==
The Jewish settlement in Georgia dates almost from the very foundation of the colony; and the early history of Georgia is practically the history of the growth and development of Savannah, Jewish life centering in that city. It would appear that a movement was set on foot in London to settle some Jews in the colony even before James Oglethorpe, in June, 1733, led his first band of followers to the point which soon after became the city of Savannah. The second vessel which reached the colony from England (on July 11, 1733) had among its passengers no less than forty Jewish emigrants. Although their arrival was unexpected, the liberal-minded governor welcomed them gladly, notwithstanding that he was aware that the trustees of the colony in England had expressed some opposition to permitting Jews to settle there due to concerns that they would dominate commercial activity. These first settlers were all of Spanish, Portuguese, and Prussian extraction, though within a year of their arrival others, who were apparently German Jews, also took up their residence there. These two bands of settlers received equally liberal treatment from Oglethorpe, and were the progenitors of one of the most important communities of Jews in the U.S. Many of their descendants are still living in various parts of the country. The first male white child born in the colony was a Jew, Philip (Uri) Minis on July 11, 1734.

Among the first immigrants was Dr. Nunis, who was made welcome because of his medical knowledge, and because he, with a number of others, brought sufficient wealth to the colony to enable the immigrants to take up large tracts of land. A congregation was organized as early as 1734. Three years later Abraham de Lyon, who had been a vigneron in Portugal, introduced the culture of grapes. The cultivation and manufacture of silk and the pursuit of agriculture and of commerce were the chief occupations of these early settlers. A dispute with the trustees of the colony respecting the introduction of slaves caused an extensive emigration to South Carolina in 1741, and resulted in the dissolution of the congregation. But in 1751 a number of Jews returned to Georgia, and in the same year the trustees sent over Joseph Ottolenghe to superintend the somewhat extensive silk-industry in the colony. Ottolenghi soon attained prominence in the political life of his associates, and was elected a member of the Assembly in 1761 and in succeeding years. There seems to have been little if any distinction made socially between the Jews and the other settlers, and educational and philanthropic institutions seem to have been supported by all alike.

The liberal charter which John Locke drew up in 1669 for the governance of the Carolinas should have operated to attract Jews there at an early date, since "Jews, heathen, and dissenters" were by the terms of Locke's charter granted full liberty of conscience. Although political changes modified Locke's original plans considerably, the spirit of tolerance was always retained. Nevertheless, no Jews in any numbers appear to have come to South Carolina until the exodus from Georgia from 1740 to 1771, already referred to. However, one Simon Valentine, one of four Jews who applied for citizenship in 1697, became the first documented Jewish landowner, which entitled him to vote. A few others followed him, for in 1703 a protest was raised against "Jew strangers" voting in an election for members of the Assembly.

In 1748, some prominent London Jews set on foot a scheme for the acquisition of a tract of 200,000 acres (80,937 ha) (809 km^{2}) of land in South Carolina. Nothing came of this, however, though on November 27, 1755, Joseph Salvador purchased 100,000 acres (40,469 ha) (405 km^{2}) of land near Fort Ninety-six for £2,000. Twenty years later Salvador sold 60,000 acres (24,281 ha) (243 km^{2}) of land for £3,000 to thirteen London Sephardic Jews. This land was known as the "Jews' Lands." Another of the Salvadors (Francis Salvador, the nephew of Joseph) purchased extensive tracts of land in the same vicinity in 1773–74. Moses Lindo, likewise a London Jew, who arrived in 1756, became actively engaged in indigo manufacture, spending large sums in its development, and making this one of the principal industries of the state.

During the Revolutionary War the Jews of South Carolina were to be found on both sides; and the most eminent of the revolutionists was Francis Salvador, who was elected a member of the First and Second Provincial Congresses which met 1775–76, the most important political office held by any Jew during the Revolution. Two-thirds of a company of militia commanded by Richard Lushington was made up of Charleston Jews.

After the fall of Charleston in 1780 the majority of Jews left that city, but most of them returned at the close of the war. The Sephardic Jews established a congregation in 1750, and the Jews of German descent another shortly thereafter. In 1791, when the Sephardic congregation was incorporated, the total number of Jews in Charleston is estimated to have been 400.

To judge by names alone, it would appear that a few Jews wandered into Virginia as early as 1624. A small number seem also to have been there before the end of the seventeenth century, but for nearly 100 years no traces of Jewish settlement are found. At least one Jewish soldier—possibly two—served in Virginia regiments under Washington in his expedition across the Allegheny Mountains in 1754. It is probable that Jews drifted into the colony from Baltimore and other points in Maryland at an early date. By 1785, Richmond had a Jewish community of about a dozen families of Spanish-Portuguese descent, which organized a Sephardic congregation in 1791. This congregation remained in existence until 1898.

A few Jews were among the traders who settled in Tennessee, near the Holston River, in 1778, but they were mere stragglers and made no permanent settlement.

Of the remaining states of the southern group east of the Mississippi River the principal Jewish settlements have been made in Alabama and Mississippi. An occasional Jew made his way into the territory which is now Alabama during the early part of the eighteenth century. One Pallachio became prominent in 1776.

It is likely that there were a few Jews in the Natchez district of Mississippi before the close of the eighteenth century, but no congregation was organized until that of Natchez was established in 1843.

== In the American Revolution ==
Before and during the American Revolutionary War the Jews had representatives of their people upon both sides of the controversy, though the majority joined the colonial side. On the Non-Importation Agreement of 1769 the names of not less than five Jews are found; this is also the case with respect to other agreements of a similar nature. The outbreak of the Revolutionary War dissolved the congregation in New York; and upon the eve of the British occupancy of the town the majority of the congregation, headed by Gershom Mendes Seixas, took all the belongings of the synagogue and removed to Philadelphia, where they established the first regular congregation, the Mickvé Israel, in 1782. The small number who remained in New York occasionally held services in the synagogue. Most of those who left for Philadelphia returned to New York after the war. Haym Solomon or (Salomon), (1740–1785) the prime financier of the American side during the American War of Independence. He was born in Prussia and died in Philadelphia, Pennsylvania.

== See also ==
- Colonial history of the United States
- History of the Jews in the United States
- American Sephardi Federation
- Native American–Jewish relations

== Notes ==
1. "Joachim Gaunse." Jewish Virtual Library.
2. "Judaism in the Boston Area." The Pluralism Project. World Religion in Boston. Harvard University.
3. Hertzburg, Arthur. The Jews in America. Columbia University Press: 1997 (p. 21-22).
4. Hebrew Printing in America (ISBN 1-59975-685-4)
5. Hertzburg, The Jews in America. (p. 9-10).
6. Sarna, Jonathan D. "American Jewry at 350: Struggles of colonial Jews foreshadow later history." JTA. November 11, 2004.

== Sources ==
- Hertzburg, Arthur. The Jews in America (Columbia University Press: 1997)
- Pool, David and Tamar de Sola. An Old Faith in a New World (Columbia University Press: 1954)
