= Jacob Barsimson =

17th-century Jewish settler in New Amsterdam (now New York City)

Jacob Barsimson (Hebrew: יעקב ברסימסון) was one of the earliest Jewish settlers at New Amsterdam (New York City) and the earliest identified Jewish settler within the present limits of the state of New York. He was an Ashkenazi Jew of Central European background.

Barsimson had been sent out by the Jewish leaders of Amsterdam, Dutch Republic, to determine the possibilities of an extensive Jewish immigration to New Amsterdam. With the fall of Dutch Brazil, it was imperative for Jews planning to leave Europe to find other new homes.

He arrived at that port on the ship Peartree (or de Pereboom) on August 22, 1654, having left the Netherlands on July 8. Barsimson used a passport issued to him by the Dutch West India Company. Another Jew named Jacob Aboaf also left the Netherlands on the ship, but departed at England. Barsimson was succeeded by a party of 23 Jews, who arrived at New Amsterdam in September from Brazil. They established Congregation Shearith Israel, the first Jewish synagogue in what would become the United States. Most of these Jewish settlers were Sephardim.

== Jewish rights ==
Governor Peter Stuyvesant initially discriminated against the Jews present in New Amsterdam in a variety of ways. They were barred from serving in the militia or practicing the Jewish religion in a synagogue. In a letter to the Amsterdam Chamber of Commerce, Stuyvesant said that they were committing blasphemy. He also accused them of engaging in "their customary usury" and "deceitful trading". He restricted their ability to purchase land or trade.

In November 1655, Barsimson and another early Jewish settler, Asser Levy, petitioned the government of New Netherland for permission to stand guard to the colony like other burghers, or else to be relieved from the special monthly tax imposed on Jews in the colony, as a penance for not standing in the guard. Their request was refused with a statement that they may go elsewhere if they liked. However, Levy began serving in the militia in 1657.

In 1656, they successfully lobbied for approval to construct a Jewish cemetery, after initially being denied this request.

Barsimson and other early American Jews succeeded before long in obtaining instructions to Governor Peter Stuyvesant from his superiors, the Dutch West India Company of Holland, overruling his discrimination against Jews in the colony.

In June 1658, Barsimson was summoned to court as defendant on a Saturday, but the court decided that "Though [defendant] is absent, yet no default is entered against him, as he was summoned on his Sabbath." Therefore he was officially excused twice that month from appearing in court, due to religious reasons.

== See also ==
- History of the Jews in New York
- History of the Jews in Colonial America
