= Elias Legarde =

French colonist in Virginia (died 1670)

Elias Legarde (also known as Legardo; b. 1593 in Languedoc, France – d. 1670 in Elizabeth City, Virginia) was a tradesman of winemaking and sericulture in the Colony of Virginia. Likely the first Sephardic Jew in the New World, Legarde arrived at James City, Virginia, on ship Abigail (or Abigall [sic]) in 1621. Legarde arrived in the muster, the equivalent of an indentured servant, of Anthonie Bonall.

According to Leon Huhner, Elias was from Languedoc, France, and was hired to go to the colony to teach people how to grow grapes for wine.

Elias Legarde was living in Buckroe in Elizabeth City, Virginia, in February 1624. Elias was employed by Anthonie Bonall, age 46, who arrived on the same ship as Elias. Anthonie Bonall was a French silk maker and vigneron (someone who cultivates vineyards for winemaking), one of the men from Languedoc sent to the colony by John Bonall, keeper of the silkworms of King James I.

In 1628 Elias leased 100 acres on the west side of Harris Creek in Elizabeth City.

== See also ==
- Colonial history of the United States
- History of the Jews in the United States
- History of the Jews in Colonial America
