= Jacob Lumbrozo =

Portuguese physician

Jacob Lumbrozo (born in Lisbon in an unknown year – died between September 24, 1665 and May 31, 1666), also known as John Lumbroso, was a Portuguese-born physician, farmer, and trader resident in the British colony of Maryland in the middle of the 17th century. He is the first Jewish resident of Maryland who can be identified by documentary evidence.

== Biography ==
Born in Portugal, Lumbrozo moved to Holland, and ultimately established himself in Maryland on January 24, 1656. His arrival formed, directly or indirectly, an important event in the life of the province. He early exercised his profession, and apparently enjoyed a lucrative practise. On September 10, 1663, letters of denization were issued to him, together with certain privileges, enabling him to take up land under the liberal terms established by the proprietary—a privilege of which he promptly availed himself. A "Mistress Lumbrozo" was living in September 1663, having arrived in Maryland in the preceding year. She was probably not of Jewish descent. Lumbrozo appeared as a witness in a lawsuit in 1657, and served as a juror in 1663. In 1665, he was granted a commission to trade with Native Americans. He seems to have been in active business with London merchants and to have corresponded with a sister in Holland. He amassed considerable wealth both in real and in personal property.

Although Jews were resident in Maryland probably from its settlement, Lumbrozo is the first Jew—indeed the only one of that time—of whose faith there is documentary evidence. He was one of the earliest medical practitioners in the colony, and for nearly a decade continued to be an important figure in its economic activity. His career is of widest interest in its relation to the history and nature of religious toleration in Maryland. After living for at least two years in undisturbed quiet as a recognized Jew, and probably as a professed one, he was, in 1658, through the activity of zealots and in consequence of his own indiscretion, arrested, under the provisions of the so-called Toleration Act of 1649, for "blasphemy"; that is, for denial of the doctrine of the Trinity, thus becoming liable to punishment by death and forfeiture of lands and goods.

At a meeting of the provincial court held at St. Mary's during the winter of 1658, Lumbrozo was charged with uttering words of blasphemy against "Our Blessed Saviour, Jesus Christ." The prosecution called two witnesses, one of which, John Fossett, testified that Lumbrozo told him that Christ performed "necromancy, or sorcery." Lumbrozo testified in his own behalf that he had not intended to say anything blasphemous, but he was merely expressing his opinion as a Jew. The general amnesty proclaimed in the province ten days later, upon the accession of Richard Cromwell to the English protectorate, gave him his freedom.

Lumbrozo also instigated his own charges in 1658. He reported to the proprietary authorities that a minister, John Legatt, had married two couples without complying with the provision of the law of marriages. At that time Maryland required nearly two pounds sterling for banns and licensing to be recorded before a couple could be married. Lumbrozo was unable to offer any evidence to support his charge again Legatt and the case was dismissed.

Records show that Lumbrozo was embroiled in another controversy in 1662 when he testified in a defamation suit in Charles County. John and Margery Gould brought suit again Giles and Elizabeth Glover attesting that Elizabeth Glover had called Margery Gould a "whore and in saying could prove her a whore." Lumbrozo, a "trusty and well-beloved friend" of the Goulds, represented them in the defamation case. A decision was never reached, but for his representation, according to later testimony, Lumbrozo requested intercourse from Margery Gould. When the Goulds filed suit for his actions, Lumbrozo counter-sued for defamation. It was later discovered during trial that Lumbrozo was more than a "friend", he was actually the Goulds' employer and they intended to file for release from their service because of Lumbrozo's attempted rape. Lumbrozo withdrew from his action of defamation thereby admitting his own guilt.

== See also ==
- Lombroso
- List of people from Maryland
- Jewish history in Colonial America

== Bibliography of Article in Jewish Encyclopedia ==
- Jacob Harry Hollander, Some Unpublished Material Relating to Dr. Jacob Lumbrozo of Maryland, in Publ. Am. Jew. Hist. Soc. No. 1 (1893), pp. 25–39;
  - idem, Civil Status of the Jews in Maryland, 1624-1776, ib. No. 2 (1894), pp. 33–44, and references therein cited
