= Jews in New Amsterdam =

1654 introduction of Jews to North America

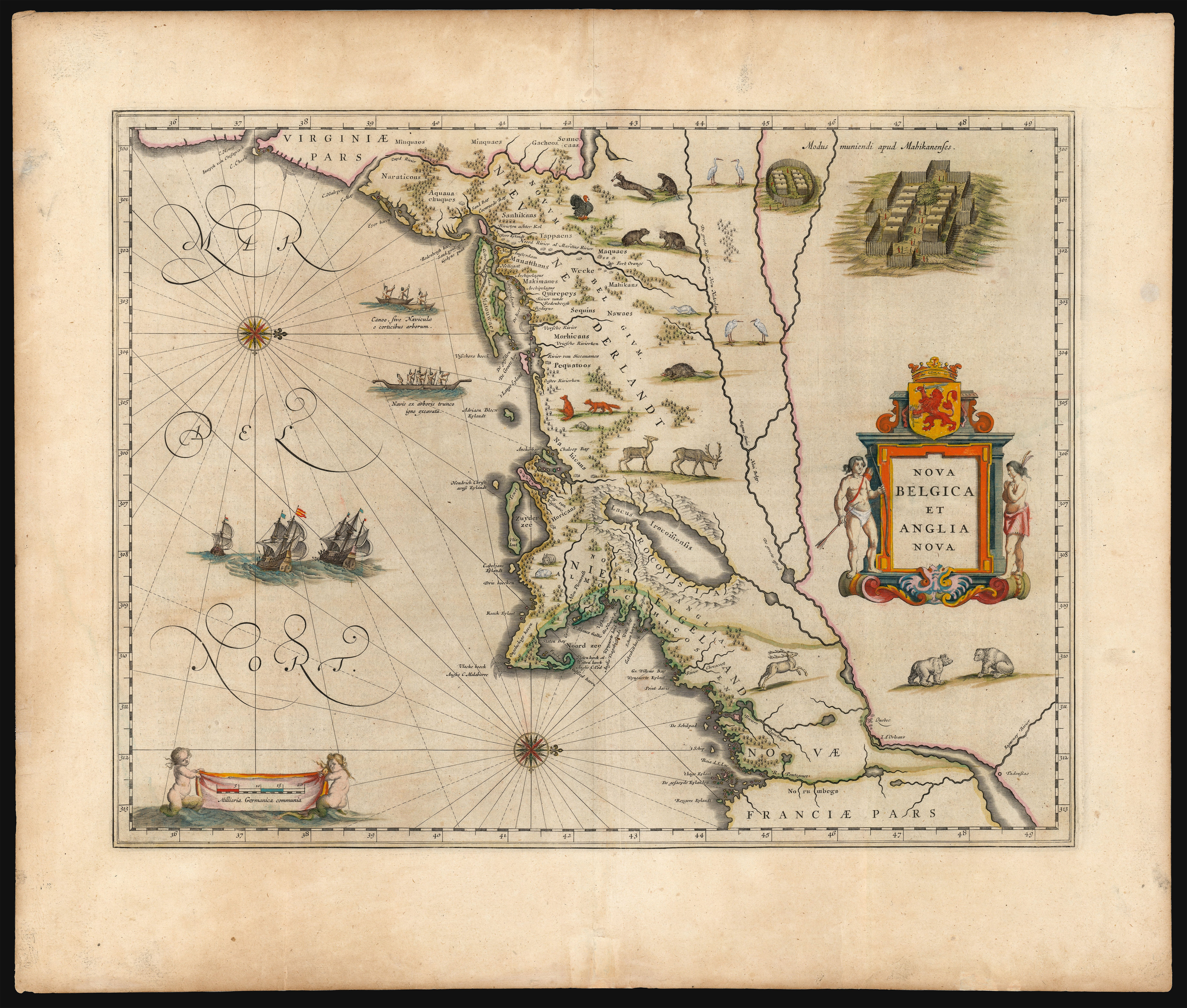
A map of New Netherland and New England, with north to the right.

A group of 23 Jews arrived in New Amsterdam in early September 1654, after the fall of Dutch Brazil forced many Jewish families to leave Recife and seek refuge from the Portuguese Inquisition. Peter Stuyvesant tried to have them expelled, but the Dutch West India Company overruled him and allowed Jews to live, travel, and trade in the colony, provided they did not become a burden.

The group was made up of a number of families, and was the first Jewish community in the United States, later centered around Congregation Shearith Israel. Most Jews left New Amsterdam within years of arriving, and only one remained when the English conquered the colony. The arrival has since been commemorated by anniversary celebrations.

== Arrival ==
=== Journey from Brazil ===
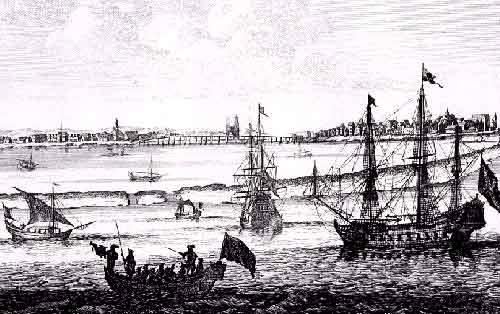
View of the city of Maurícia (Recife) by Peter Schenk the Elder (1660–), 1645.

The Recapture of Recife in January 1654 ended Dutch Brazil. The Dutch signed a capitulation agreement with the Brazilian and Portuguese army on January 26, 1654. As one of the terms of the agreement, the deadline for the departure of Dutch subjects living in Recife and Maurícia who did not wish to remain was three months later, on the April 26. However, there was a shortage of space on boats, so members of the former Dutch government in Recife requested Francisco Barreto de Meneses to extend the deadline. Barreto responded that after this date treatment for all would remain the same except for Jews who had converted from Christianity (marranos) back to Judaism, or who secretly practiced it. To these he could offer no protection from the Inquisition after the deadline. (Note: The jurisdiction of the Inquisition was limited to heretics. The majority of the Jewish population of Dutch Brazil were former marranos.) Documents indicate that all Jews left on time, and there is no trace of any openly professing Jews residing in Brazil from 1654 until the 19th century. For his favourable treatment of Jews, Wiznitzer writes, "Barreto remains in Jewish history as one of the hasidei umot ha-olam (righteous Gentiles of the world)".

Most of the 150 Jewish families departed for Holland. However, one group was detained by the Spanish in Jamaica, and the Jewish passengers were taken into custody. The Dutch government wrote to the Council of State of the King of Spain notifying it that a boat carrying many Jews who were Dutch subjects had been driven by adverse winds to Jamaica, and asking that the Spanish authorities return them home rather than hand them over to the Inquisition.

In an unpublished manuscript, Saul Levi Morteira (d. 1660) wrote that one of the ships carrying Jews

was captured by the Spaniards, who wanted to surrender the poor Jews to the Inquisition. However, before they were able to carry out their evil intentions, the Lord caused a French ship to appear on the scene which freed the Jews from the Spaniards and took them to safety to Florida (or to Africa) or to the New Netherlands whence they arrived peacefully in Holland.

Morteira's account was the basis for a 1784 article by David Franco Mendes, and Oppenheim connected it with the arrival of Jews in New Amsterdam in 1654. Wiznitzer points out that, in the account, the Jews are returned to Europe; he says that either this ship was unrelated to the 23, or the account is "based upon confused stories that former Brazilian Jews of his congregation related to their hakham".

=== Arrival in New Amsterdam ===
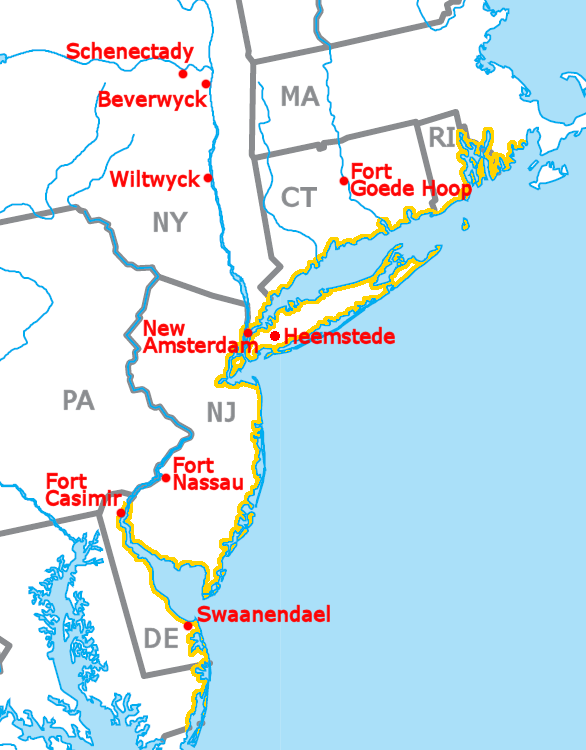
Map of New Netherland, showing Dutch settlements within modern boundaries.

23 Jews arrived in New Amsterdam in early September on a boat named Sainte Catherine, or St. Catrina, and a record of a burgomasters and schepens meeting on September 7 documents their arrival:

Jacques de la Motthe, master of the Bark St .Charles [Sainte Catherine], by a petition, written in French, requests payment of the freight and board of the Jews whom he bought here from Cape St. Antony according to agreement and contract in which each is bound in solidum, and that, therefore, whatever furniture and other property they may have on board his Bark may be publickly sold by order of the Court, in payment of their debt. He verbally declares that the Netherlanders, who came over with them, are not included in the contract and have satisfied him. Solomon Pietersen, a Jew, appears in Court and says that nine hundred and odd guilders of the 2500 are paid, and that there are 23 souls, big and little, who must pay equally. The Court having seen the petition and Contract, order that the Jews shall, within twice 24 hours after date, pay according to contract what they lawfully owe; and in the meanwhile, the furniture and whatever the Petitioner has in his possession shall remain as Security, without alienating the Same.

The record states that the boat came from Cape St. Anthony, which Wiznitzer concludes must have been in Cuba. Wiznitzer theorizes that the group detained in Jamaica, who had travelled from Recife on board the Valck, had wished to travel to Martinique or New Amsterdam, and that, upon being taken into custody, instructions from Madrid ordered that the Calvinists and the Jews who were not heretics be freed, the rest held. Those freed left for Cape St. Anthony in Cuba, and from there to New Amsterdam on Sainte Catherine. This theory has been challenged on the grounds that the voyage from Jamaica to Spain and back to Jamaica again, in order for the instructions from Madrid to be communicated, would have taken at least four months, and that this, combined with the examination of the religion of the passengers, the discussion and preparation of the instructions, and the rest of the trip to New Amsterdam via Cuba, would have taken a whole year.

Wiznitzer estimates that the newly arrived Jews consisted of four men, six women, and thirteen children. He dismisses as a "fairy tale" the theory that, upon their arrival, they found only one Jew, Jacob Barsimson. He refers to a letter written by Reverend Johannes Megapolensis to the Dutch Reformed Church in Amsterdam in March 1655, stating that the previous summer "some Jews came here from Holland, in order to trade". Solomon Pietersen intervened as an attorney for the 23 new arrivals, and Wiznitzer considers it unlikely that he would have intervened in his own case. Unlike Oppenheim and Wiznitzer, Hershkowitz believes that Asser Levy was not from Brazil, but was also in New Amsterdam when the 23 arrived. The 23 Jews were partly Ashkenazic, from Germany and Italy, and partly Sephardic.

== Rights ==
=== Residence ===
Peter Stuyvesant sent a letter to the Dutch West India Company on September 22, stating that he had required the newly arrived Jews to depart. He cited the offense caused by their "customary usury and deceitful trading with the Christians", as well as fears that, in their present impoverished state, they may become a burden. It is unlikely that any action was taken on this decision until hearing back from Holland. In January 1655 Jews in Amsterdam sent a petition to the company directors asking that Jews be allowed to travel to and reside in New Netherland. They argued that the growth of the population of the new territory would be beneficial to its development; that it was customary to treat Jews as equals in the Netherlands; that many of the company's shareholders were Jewish; and that the French and English allowed Jews to travel to their American territories of Martinique, St. Christopher and Barbados. This petition was granted on February 15, on the condition that the Jews "not become a charge on the deaconry or the Company".

The company sent a letter in response to Stuyvesant, dated April 26, 1655, rejecting his proposal to expel the Jews from New Amsterdam. It cited "the considerable loss sustained by this [the Jewish] nation, with others, in the taking of Brazil, as also because of the large amount of capital which they [the Jews] still have invested in the shares of this company". This letter granted Jews permission to live, travel, and trade in New Netherland, provided they did not become a burden.

=== Religion ===
In a letter to Stuyvesant dated March 13, 1656, the company stated that the rights of the Jews in New Netherland did not include "a license to exercise and carry on their religion in synagogues or gatherings", and instructed Stuyvesant to refer any requests for religious liberty from the Jews to them. An indication of religious tolerance appears in records from June 1658, when Jacob Barsimson was forgiven for not attending court as he had been summoned on the Sabbath.

The new community founded Congregation Shearith Israel, which remains the oldest Jewish congregation in the United States. The Jews first applied for the purchase of a burial ground in July 1655, and then again in February 1656, at which time it was granted. According to Oppenheim it was located at "the New Bowery [St. James Place] and Chatham Square".

=== Trade ===
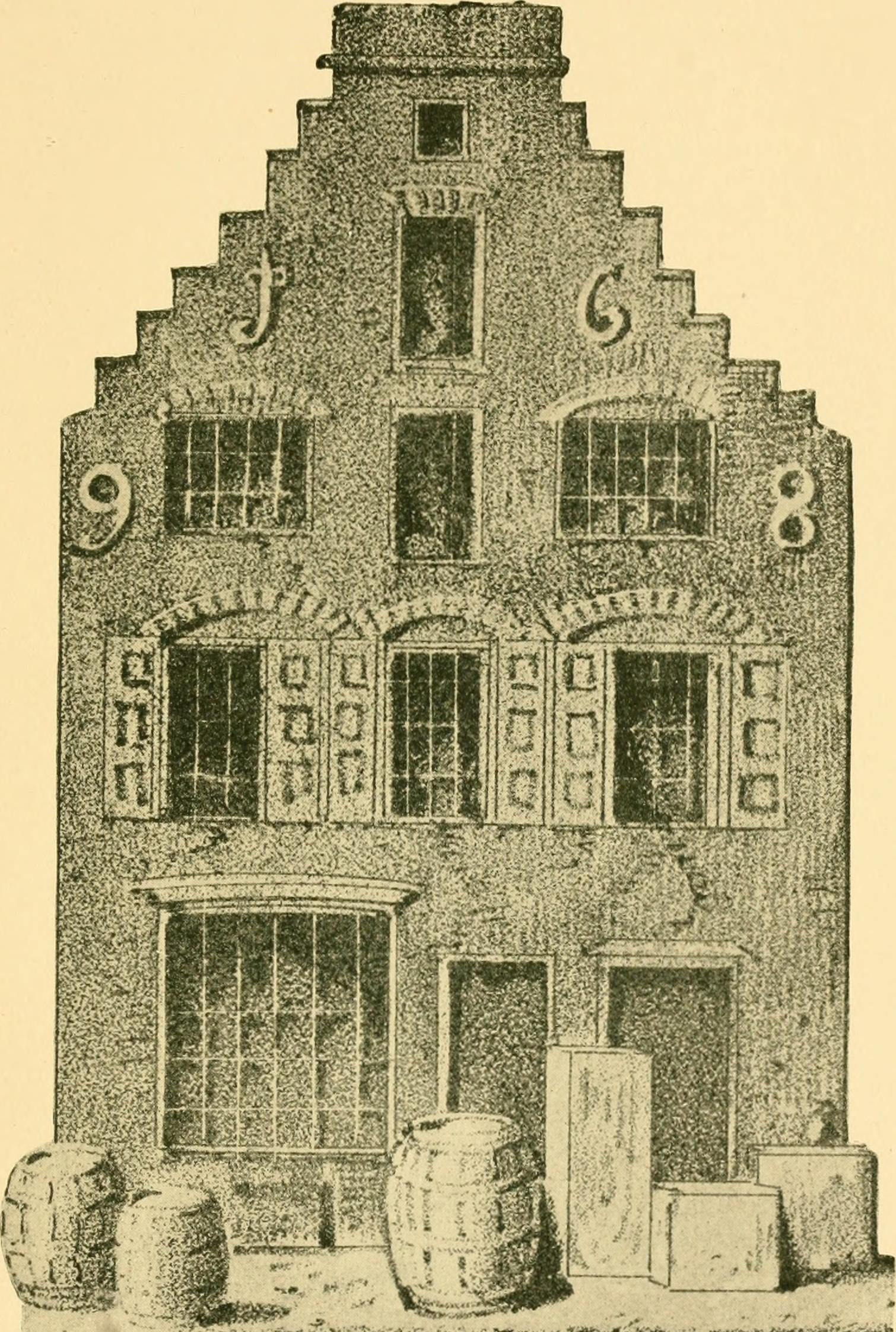
Example of Dutch Colonial architecture in New York.

In November 1655 the Jews petitioned the director and council of New Netherland to allow them to trade to the South River, Fort Orange, and other places. This was denied. In December 1655, a Jew named Salvador Dandrada was declined the right to purchase a house. On March 14, 1656, the Jews again petitioned Stuyvesant and the council for permission to trade at various places, and also to own real estate, arguing that these rights were included in the original petition approved by the company. The council rejected the petition, advising that the question be put to the directors of the company. The company directors replied in a letter dated 14 June 1656:

We have here seen and learned with displeasure, that your Honors, against our apostille of the 15th of February, 1655, granted to the Jewish or Portuguese nation at their request, have forbidden them to trade at Fort Orange and South River, and also the purchase of real estate, which is allowed them here in this country without any difficulty, and we wish that this had not occurred but that your Honors had obeyed our orders which you must hereafter execute punctually and with more respect.

The letter affirmed the right of the Jews to "carry on their business as heretofore and exercise in all quietness their religion within their houses". However, they were prohibited from becoming mechanics or opening retail shops. Nevertheless, records from 1656 onwards show that the Jews were allowed to open retail shops in the colony.

=== Burgher rights ===
In April 1657, the burgomasters recorded the names of those claiming burgher rights. Asser Levy argued that he should be granted the right, since he performed watch and ward like other burghers and held burgher rights in Amsterdam. The burgomasters rejected his claim, and the Jews then appealed to Stuyvesant and the council for Jews' eligibility for burgher rights. Their appeal was granted immediately.

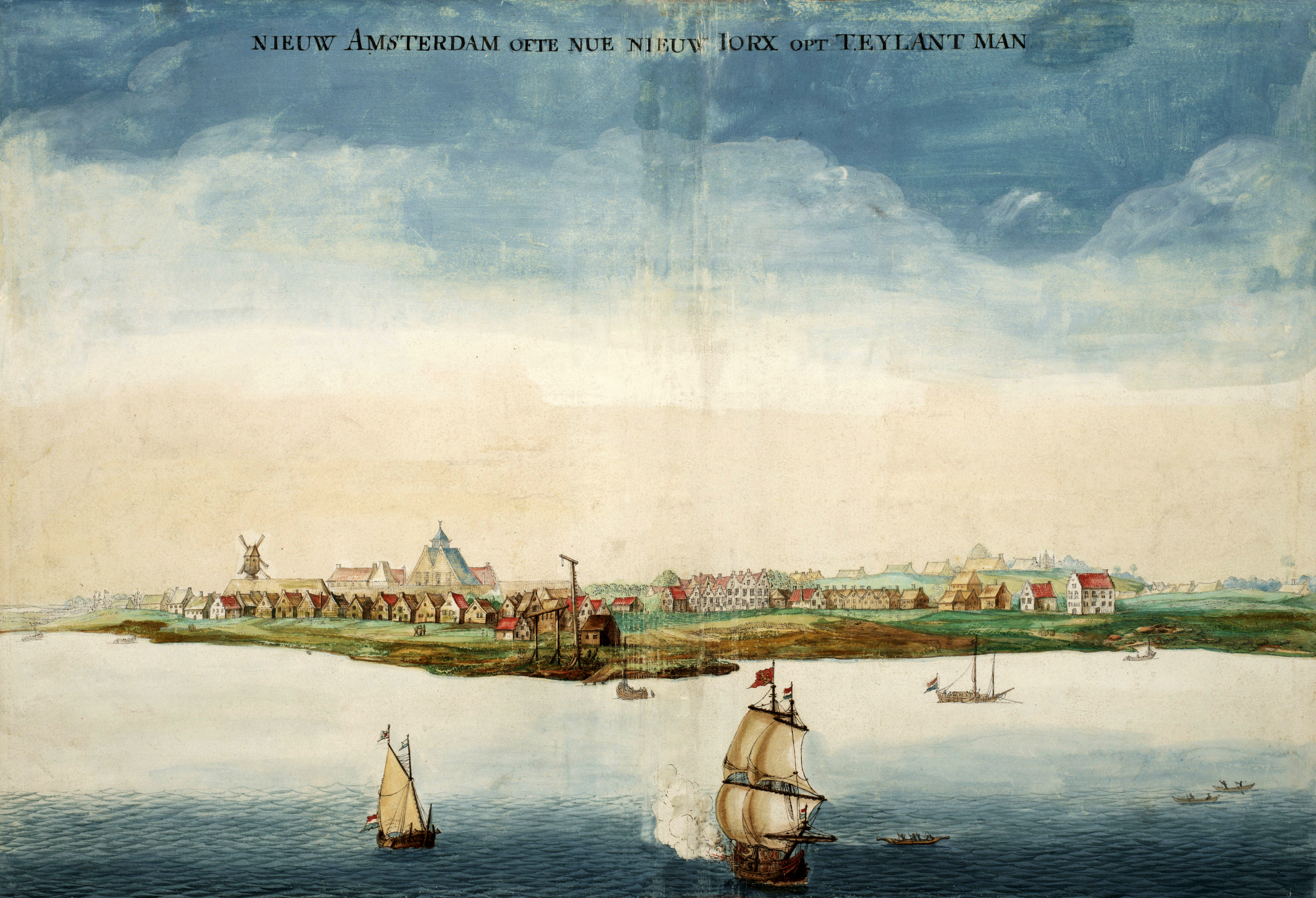
"Gezicht op Nieuw Amsterdam," Johannes Vingboons, in 1664, the year it was conquered by the British.

== Exodus ==
Large numbers of Jews emigrated from New Netherland in 1657. When the Dutch surrendered to the English in 1664, anyone who remained was required to sign an oath of allegiance to the English crown. The one Jewish name on the list was that of Asser Levy. He was the only recorded Jewish presence New York until he was joined by relatives in 1680.

== Commemoration ==
=== Anniversary celebrations ===
The 250th anniversary of the arrival was marked a year late in 1905, and the 300th anniversary was marked in 1954. The 300th anniversary was marked for an eight-month period, from September 1954–May 1955. For this milestone, a Jewish Tercentenary Monument and flagstaff designed by Abram Belskie was placed on Peter Minuit Plaza in Manhattan's Battery, and another Jewish Tercentenary Monument and flagstaff designed by Carl C. Mose with a wave-shaped relief bearing illustrations of the Four Freedoms as inspired by Hebrew Bible verses, as well as a conjectural image of the St. Catrina, was placed in St. Louis's Forest Park.

Forest Park monument reliefs:

Obverse:

- St. Catrina conjectural image
- "Who Shall Ascend into the Mountain of the Lord" (Freedom of worship / Psalm 24)
- "Proclaim Liberty Throughout the Land" (Freedom of speech / Jubilee (biblical))

Reverse:

- Dove and decorative vegetation
- "And None Shall Make Them Afraid" (Freedom from fear / Figs in the Bible)
- "For the Widow ... For the Stranger ... For the Fatherless" (Freedom from want / Deuteronomist)

The 350th anniversary was observed for another one-year celebration from September 2004–September 2005, with exhibitions at the Library of Congress and the American Jewish Historical Society opening in September and May, and inspired the institution of the first annual Jewish American Heritage Month a year later in May 2006.

=== Official Recognition: "Landing Day" ===
On September 12, 2024, the City Council voted to officially recognize Landing Day, to be celebrated during the second week of September. The resolution aims to “commemorate the arrival of the first Jewish community in New Amsterdam in 1654 and to celebrate the continuing importance of the Jewish community in the City of New York.”

== See also ==
- Colonial Brazil (Portuguese America)
- Dutch colonization of the Americas
- Dutch West India Company
- History of the Jews in New York City
- History of the Jews in Amsterdam
- History of the Jews in the Netherlands
- New Amsterdam
- New Netherland
- Portuguese Inquisition
- Sephardic Jews in the Netherlands
- Sephardim
- Spanish Inquisition
