= Lombroso =

Lombroso, Lumbroso or Lumbrozo is a surname, derived from a Sephardi family. Notable people with the surname include

- Cesare Lombroso (1835–1909), Italian criminologist
- Daniel Lombroso, American filmmaker
- Isaac Lumbroso (1680–1752), rabbi and talmudist
- Jacob Lumbrozo, Portuguese traveller, first Jew to permanently settle in the American British colonies

== See also ==
- Mocatta, also known as Lumbrozo de Mattos Mocatta or Lumbroso de Mattos Mocatta, a distinguished ancient Anglo-Jewish family
- Luis de Carvajal the Younger, who also referred to himself as Joseph Lombroso
