= Joseph Ottolenghe =

Joseph Ottolenghe (c. 1711–1775) was an Italian-British-American catechist, manufacturer, politician, and slaveholder.

== Early life ==
Born in Casale, Italy, to a Jewish family, Joseph Ottolenghe received license to work as a shohet, or ritual butcher, right before moving in with his uncle in London in 1732. The pair relocated to Exeter after a failed attempt to have Ottolenghe marry his uncle’s daughter.

== Conversion to Christianity ==
After learning English, he read the New Testament and converted to Christianity. This furthered the growing divide between him and his uncle that ultimately landed Ottolenghe in debtor’s prison. Luckily, his fellow Anglicans learned of his plight and secured his release. Ottolenghe then established himself in Exeter and lived there for a number of years. In 1751 he answered the call to work in the colony of Georgia as a catechist to the Black slaves living there. While his catechist work saw little success due to his own prejudices and the transitory nature of life in enslavement, Ottolenghe quickly established himself in other arenas of colonial life.

== Silk production in Georgia ==
By 1753 he owned 500 acres of land and became superintendent at the newly established silk filature, he entered the Georgia General Assembly in 1755, and began serving as Justice for the Peace for Savannah and Christ Church Parish in 1756. Through his influence, the high quality of Georgian silk became known throughout the British empire, and Ottolonghe’s writing on silk-manufacturing appeared in London and Philadelphia. He also influenced countless fundamental pieces of Georgian legislature until being dismissed in 1766 for his contemptuous behaviour and disobedience. He was elected to the American Philosophical Society in 1771.

His jealousy and paranoia also delayed his taking of an apprentice in the silk business for many years. Despite this, Joseph Ottolenghe died an influential figure in multiple fields of Georgian life, and with a successor to carry on his work in the filature until the Revolutionary War disrupted the business.
