= Asser Levy =

Early Jewish resident of New York

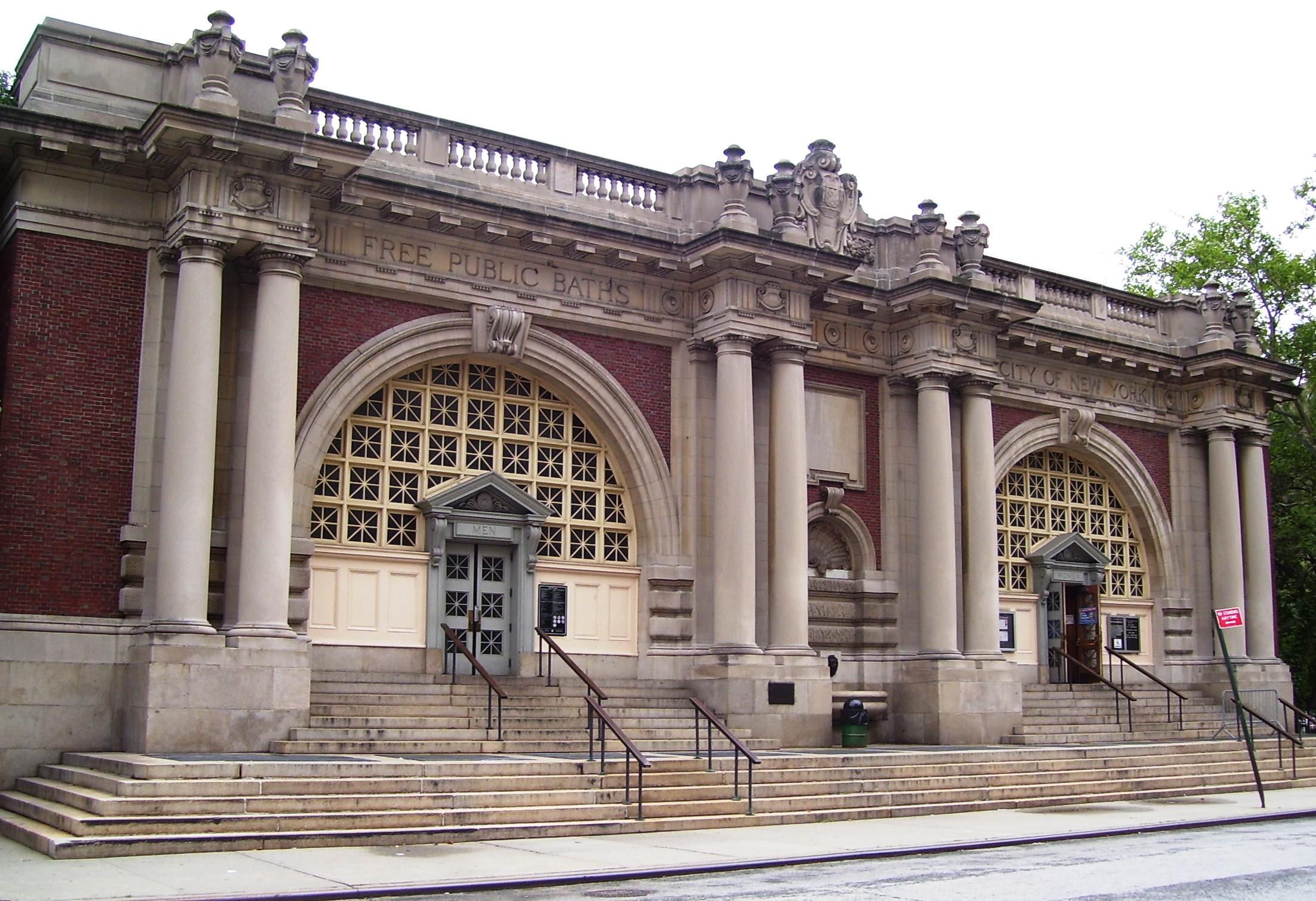
Asser Levy Public Baths is on Asser Levy Place in Manhattan, New York City, both named after Levy

Asser Levy (died February 1682), also known as Asser Levy van Swellem and Asher Levy, was one of the first Jewish settlers of the Dutch colony of New Amsterdam on Manhattan Island.

== Life and career ==
Levy was likely born in Vilna, (or possibly in Amsterdam). Vilna was then part of the Polish–Lithuanian Commonwealth, and he may have moved to Amsterdam as a result of the Khmelnytsky pogroms. From Amsterdam, he moved to the New World. It is known that he eventually went to New Netherland, possibly arriving in New Amsterdam in early September 1654 aboard the Peereboom, but possibly the St. Catherine or St. Charles with 23 Jewish refugees who fled from Recife after the end of Dutch rule in the area. Levy's wife was named Miriam Israel.

In 1655, Peter Stuyvesant, the governor of the colony, was ordered to attack New Sweden, the Swedish colony on the Delaware River, and accordingly issued orders for the enlistment of all adults. Several Jews, among them Asser Levy, appear to have been ready to serve when the governor and council passed an ordinance "that Jews can not be permitted to serve as soldiers, but shall instead pay a monthly contribution for the exemption." Levy and his comrades at once refused to pay, and on November 5, 1655, petitioned for leave to stand guard like other burghers (townsmen) or to be relieved from the tax. The petition was rejected with the comment that if the petitioners were not satisfied with the law they might go elsewhere. Levy successfully appealed to Holland, and was subsequently permitted to do guard duty like other citizens.

Levy appears also as a prominent trader in Fort Orange, later known as Albany. He was also one of the first licensed butchers in the colony. In 1657, a burgher of a city or colony who was also a member of the mercantile class was entitled to certain rights. The burgher right was made essential for certain trading privileges, and within two days of a notice to that effect Asser Levy appeared in court requesting to be admitted as a burgher. The officials expressed their surprise at such a request. The record reads: "The Jew claims that such ought not to be refused him as he keeps watch and ward like other burghers, showing a burgher's certificate from the city of Amsterdam that the Jew is a burgher there." The application was denied, and Levy at once brought the matter before Stuyvesant and the council, which ordered that Jews should be admitted as burghers on April 21, 1657.

Two archived documents from Amsterdam reveal his travel to and presence in the city in April 1660, seeking payment of a debt owed to him, and on May 24, 1660, he announced he was going to Germany.

Levy was the first Jew to own a house in North America. As early as 1661, he purchased real estate in Fort Orange; he was also the earliest Jewish owner of real estate in New York City, his transactions there commencing in June 1662 with the purchase of land on South William Street. Within ten years of his arrival Levy had become a man of consequence, and when, in 1664, the wealthiest inhabitants were summoned to lend the city money for fortifications against the English, he was the only Jew among them: he lent the city 100 florins.

Levy figures most prominently in the Dutch records as a litigant, his name often appearing for days in succession. He invariably argued his own case and was almost invariably successful. Only on two or three occasions did he figure as a defendant. As a litigant he is named also in the records of Gravesend, Brooklyn in 1674. Levy's trading relations extended to New England, and he frequently appeared as an attorney for merchants in Holland. In 1671 he lent the money for building the first Lutheran church in New York. About 1678 he built a slaughterhouse in the east end of what is now Wall Street, where he appears to have been the owner of a tavern.

The confidence his Christian fellow citizens had in his honesty appears frequently from the court records. Property in litigation was put into his custody; he is named as executor in the wills of Christian merchants, and figures as both administrator and trustee in colonial records. His influence was not confined to New York; in the colonial records of Connecticut he appears as intervening to obtain the remission of a fine imposed upon a Jew there. The court remitted the fine with the comment that it did so "as a token of its respect to the said Mr. Asser Levy." He left a considerable estate, over which there was a long legal contest.

== Memorials ==
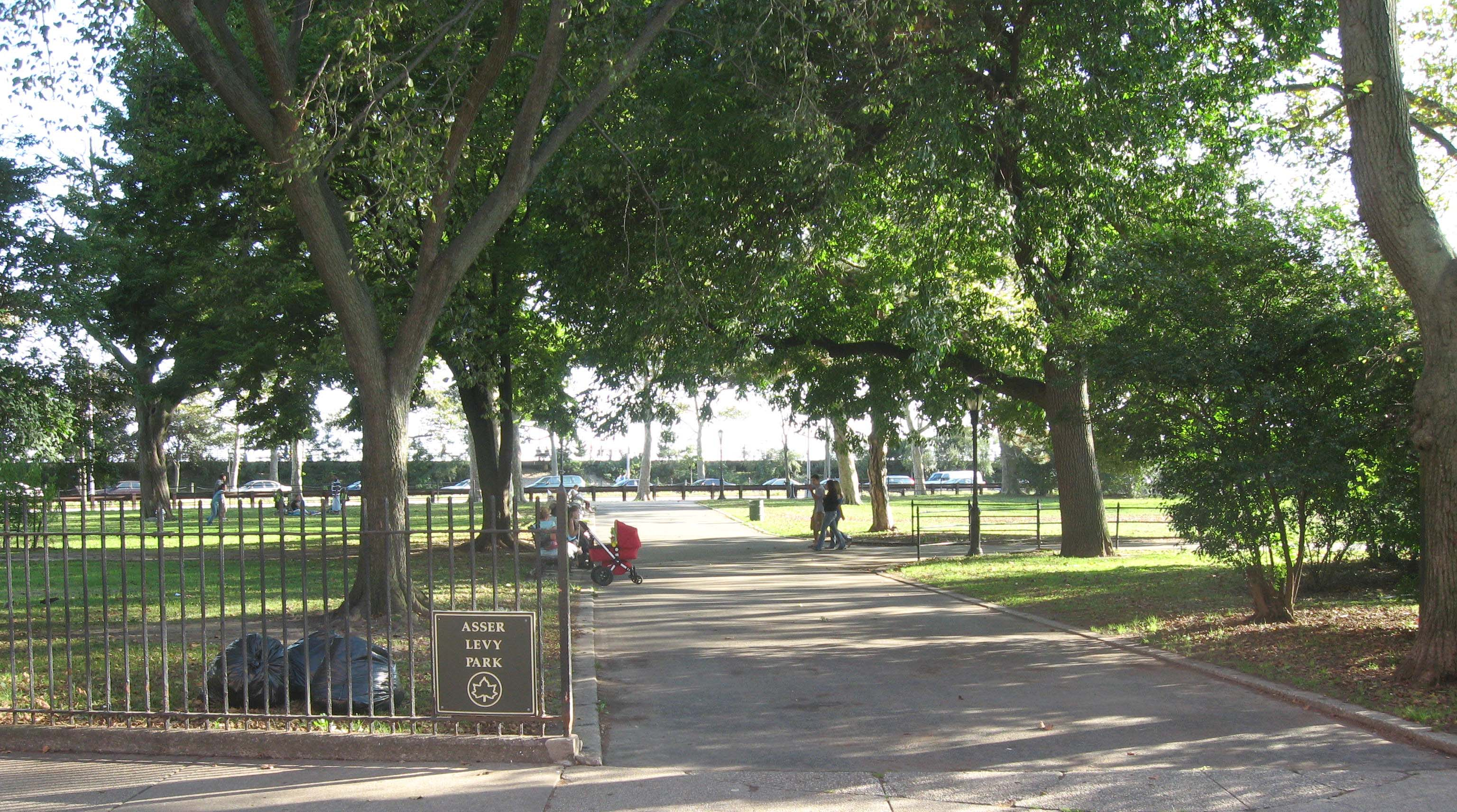
Asser Levy Park, Coney Island

New York City structures honoring Levy include:

- Asser Levy Recreation Center, a park between 23rd and 25th Streets in Manhattan, New York. The recreation center includes the Asser Levy Public Baths and the Asser Levy Playground, part of which occupies a former road called Asser Levy Place,
- Asser Levy Park, in Coney Island, Brooklyn,
- Asher Levy School, PS 19, an elementary school in Manhattan.

== See also ==
- Jewish history in Colonial America
- History of the Jews in the United States
- History of the Jews in New York
