= History of the Jews in New York City =

Jews in New York
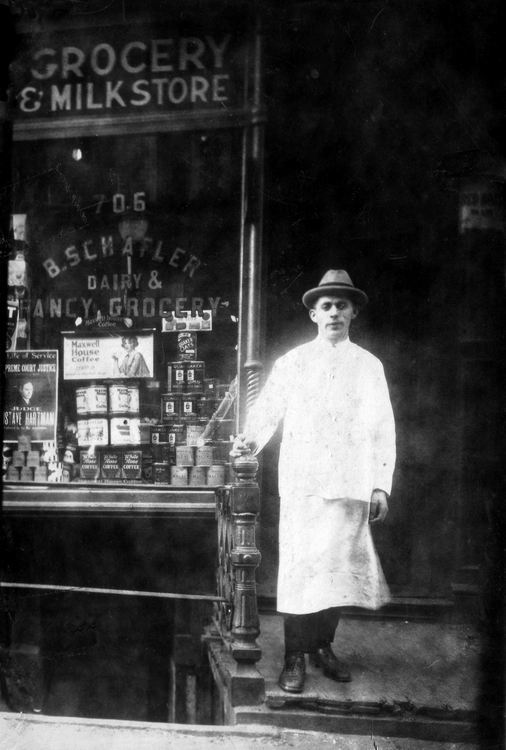
- Jewish shopkeeper in New York City, c. 1929

Total population
- 960,000

Languages
- New York City English, American English, Hebrew, Yiddish, Russian

Religion
- Orthodox Judaism, Haredi Judaism, Conservative Judaism, Reform Judaism, irreligious

New York City is home to the largest urban Jewish community in the world. As of 2020, the city is home to over 960,000 Jews across the five boroughs, representing approximately 12% of the city's total population, with nearly half residing in Brooklyn. A total of 1.9 million Jews live in the wider New York metropolitan area, comprising roughly one quarter of the American Jewish population.

The first recorded Jewish settler was Jacob Barsimson, who arrived in New Amsterdam in August 1654 on a passport from the Dutch West India Company. The first significant group of Jewish settlers came in September 1654 from Recife, Brazil, as refugees fleeing persecution by the Portuguese Inquisition. Following the 1881 assassination of Alexander II of Russia and the resulting surge of antisemitic pogroms in the Russian Empire, the largest wave of Jewish immigration to the United States took place, during which the Jewish population rose from about 80,000 in 1880 to 1.5 million in 1920. By 1910, New York became the world's largest Jewish city, with more than 1 million Jews accounting for 25 percent of the city's population.

In 2012, the largest Jewish denominations in New York City were Orthodox, Haredi, and Conservative Judaism. Reform Jewish communities are prevalent throughout the area. The large Jewish population has had a profound impact on the culture of New York City. After a period of mid-20th-century decline due to suburban migration, New York City's Jewish population has rebounded in the 21st century, driven largely by the high birth rates of Hasidic and other Orthodox communities.

Along with the metro area suburbs of Long Island and Hudson Valley, New York is home to approximately 1.75 million Jews, constituting roughly 11 percent of the state's total population.

== Historical population ==
Year	Jewish Population	Total City Population	Percentage of City
1654	23	1,000	2.3
1750	300	13,000	2.3
1850	16,000	515,000	3.1
1859	40,000	813,000	4.9
1880	80,000	1,206,000	6.6
1920	1,600,000	5,620,000	28.5
1950	2,000,000	7,900,000	25.3
1981	1,100,000	7,000,000	15.8
1991	1,027,000	7,340,000	14
2002	972,000	8,000,000	12
2012	1,100,000	8,340,000	13.2
2023	960,000	8,260,000	11.6

=== Population comparisons ===
By area, there are just over 1.3 million Jews in the New York metropolitan area, making it the second largest metropolitan Jewish community in the world, after the Tel Aviv Metropolitan Area in Israel. By city size, Tel Aviv proper has a smaller population of Jews than New York City proper, making New York City the largest community of Jews in the world within a city proper. Within their respective countries, New York City's Jewish population is larger than the combined Jewish populations of Chicago, Philadelphia, San Francisco, and Washington, D.C., and, within Israel, more than Jerusalem and Tel Aviv combined.

=== Immigration overview ===
==== Ashkenazi Jews ====
During the mid-19th century Russian, Lithuanian, and Polish Jews immigrated in large numbers, and the number of Jews in New York City soared throughout the beginning of the 20th century, reaching a peak of 2 million in the 1950s, when Jews constituted one-quarter of the city's population. New York City's Jewish population then began to decline because of low fertility rates and migration to both the suburbs and other states, particularly California and Florida. Though there were small Jewish communities throughout the United States by the 1920s, about 45% of the entire population of American Jews continued to live in New York City.

A new wave of Ashkenazi and Bukharian Jewish immigrants from the former Soviet Union began arriving in the 1980s and 1990s. In 2002, an estimated 972,000 Ashkenazi Jews lived in New York City, and constituted about 12% of the city's population. Many Jews, including the newer immigrants, have settled in Queens, south Brooklyn, and the Bronx, where at present most live in middle-class neighborhoods. The number of Jews is especially high in Brooklyn, where 561,000 residents—one out of four inhabitants—is Jewish.

== Current communities ==
=== Orthodox Jews ===
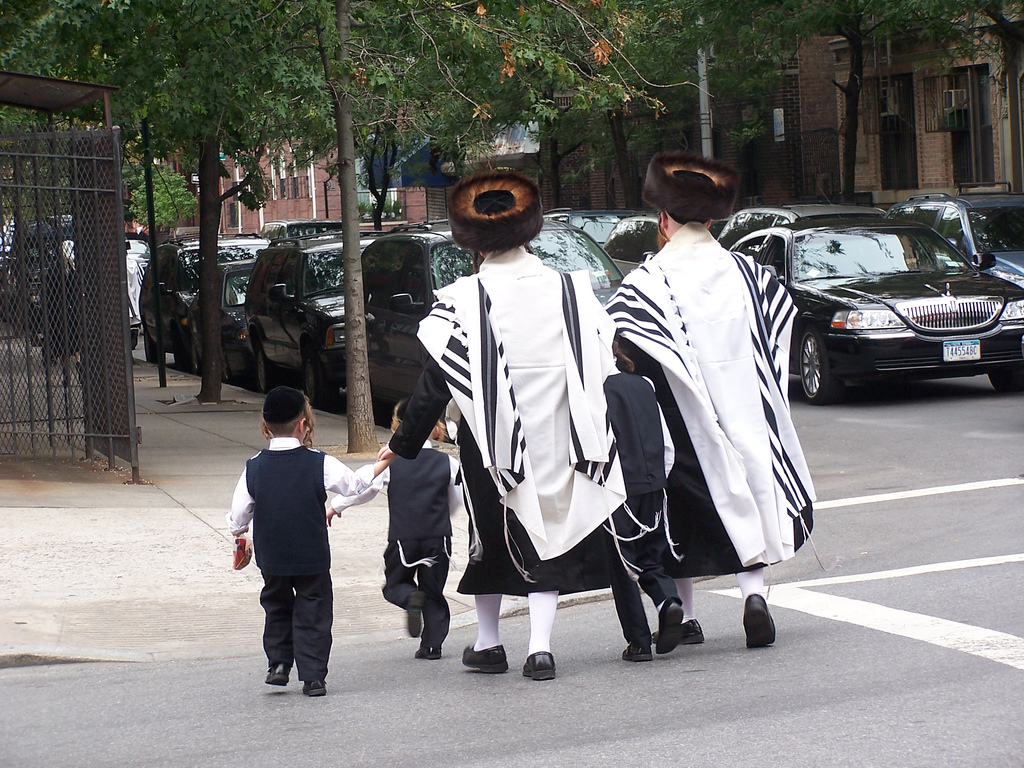
Ultra-Orthodox Jews in Brooklyn, which has the largest Jewish population in the US with over 561,000, more than in Tel Aviv.

New York City is home to many Orthodox Jews. The world headquarters of the Chabad, Bobov, and Satmar branches of Hasidism are located there, as well as other Haredi branches of Judaism. While three-quarters of New York Jews do not consider themselves religiously observant, the Orthodox community is rapidly growing due to the high birth rates of Hasidic Jews, while the number of Conservative and Reform Jews has been declining. Borough Park, known for its large Orthodox Jewish population, had 27.9 births per 1,000 residents in 2015, making it the neighborhood with the city's highest birth rate. However, the most rapidly growing community of American Orthodox Jews is located in Rockland County and the Hudson Valley of New York, including the communities of Monsey, Monroe, New Square, Kiryas Joel, and Ramapo. According to a 2011 UJA-Federation of New York community study, there were 340,000 Haredi Jews in the greater New York metropolitan area. Many rapidly growing Orthodox Jewish communities there have made their home in New Jersey, particularly in Lakewood and surrounding Ocean County, where Beth Medrash Govoha, the world's largest yeshiva outside Israel, is located. Prominent Orthodox organizations such as Agudath Israel of America and the Orthodox Union have their headquarters in New York.

=== Sephardic Jews ===
Sephardic Jews, including Syrian Jews, have also lived in New York City since the late 19th century. Many Sephardi immigrants have settled in New York City and formed a Sephardi community. The community is centered in Brooklyn and is primarily composed of Syrian Jews. Other Sephardi Jews in New York City hail from Egypt, Israel, Lebanon, and Morocco. Sephardi Jews first began arriving in New York City in large numbers between 1880 and 1924. Most Arab immigrants during these years were Christian, while Sephardi Jews were a minority and Arab Muslims largely began migrating during the mid-1960s. When Syrian Jews first began to arrive in New York City during the late 1800s and early 1900s, Eastern European Ashkenazi Jews on the Lower East Side sometimes disdained their Syrian co-coreligionists as Arabische Yidden, Arab Jews. Some Ashkenazim doubted whether Sephardi/Mizrahi Jews from the Middle East were Jewish at all. In response, some Syrian Jews who were deeply proud of their ancient Jewish heritage, derogatorily dubbed Ashkenazi Jews as "J-Dubs", a reference to the first and third letters of the English word "Jew".

In the 1990 United States Census, there were 11,610 Sephardi Jews in New York City, composing 23 percent of the total "Arab population" of the city. Arab Jews in the city sometimes still face anti-Arab racism. After the September 11 attacks, some Arab Jews in New York City were subjected to arrest and detention because they were suspected to be Islamist terrorists. Egyptian Jews arrived in New York City more recently than the Syrian Jews, with many of the Egyptian Jews speaking Ladino as well as Arabic and French. The vast majority Egyptian-Jewish immigrants to the city are Sephardi/Mizrahi, with very few being Ashkenazi. Ladino-speaking Egyptian Jews have tended to settle in the Forest Hills neighborhood of Queens. Very few Egyptian Jews lived in New York City or elsewhere in the United States prior to the 1956 Suez Crisis. Prior to the Immigration and Nationality Act of 1965, the quota for Egyptian immigrants was set at 100 people per year. Because of antisemitism directed against Egyptian Jews in Egypt, a small number of Egyptian-American Jews in New York City banded together as the "American Jewish Organization for the Middle East, Inc." to advocate for Jewish Egyptian refugees. There are two major communities of Egyptian Jews, one in Queens and another in Brooklyn. Egyptian Jews in Queens helped found Shearith Israel Congregation, while Egyptian Jews in Brooklyn's Bensonhurst neighborhood largely attended Syrian-Jewish synagogues.

=== Central Asia and the Caucasus ===
Many Central Asian Jews, predominantly Bukharian Jews from Uzbekistan, have settled in the Queens neighborhoods of Rego Park, Forest Hills, Kew Gardens, and Briarwood. As of 2001, an estimated 50,000 Bukharian Jews resided in Queens. Queens is also home to a large Georgian-American community of about 5,000, around 3,000 of whom are Georgian Jews. Queens has the third largest population of Georgian Jews in the world after Israel and Georgia. Forest Hills is home to the Congregation of Georgian Jews, the only Georgian-Jewish synagogue in the US. There has also been a sizeable community of Mountain Jews from Azerbaijan and the South Caucasus in Brooklyn.

=== Multiracial Jews ===
While the majority of Jews in New York City are non-Hispanic whites, some Jewish New Yorkers identify as Asian, Black, Latino, or multiracial. According to the same 2011 UJA-Federation of New York study, 12% of Jewish households in the city were non-white or biracial.

== Immigration history ==
=== 1654–1800 ===
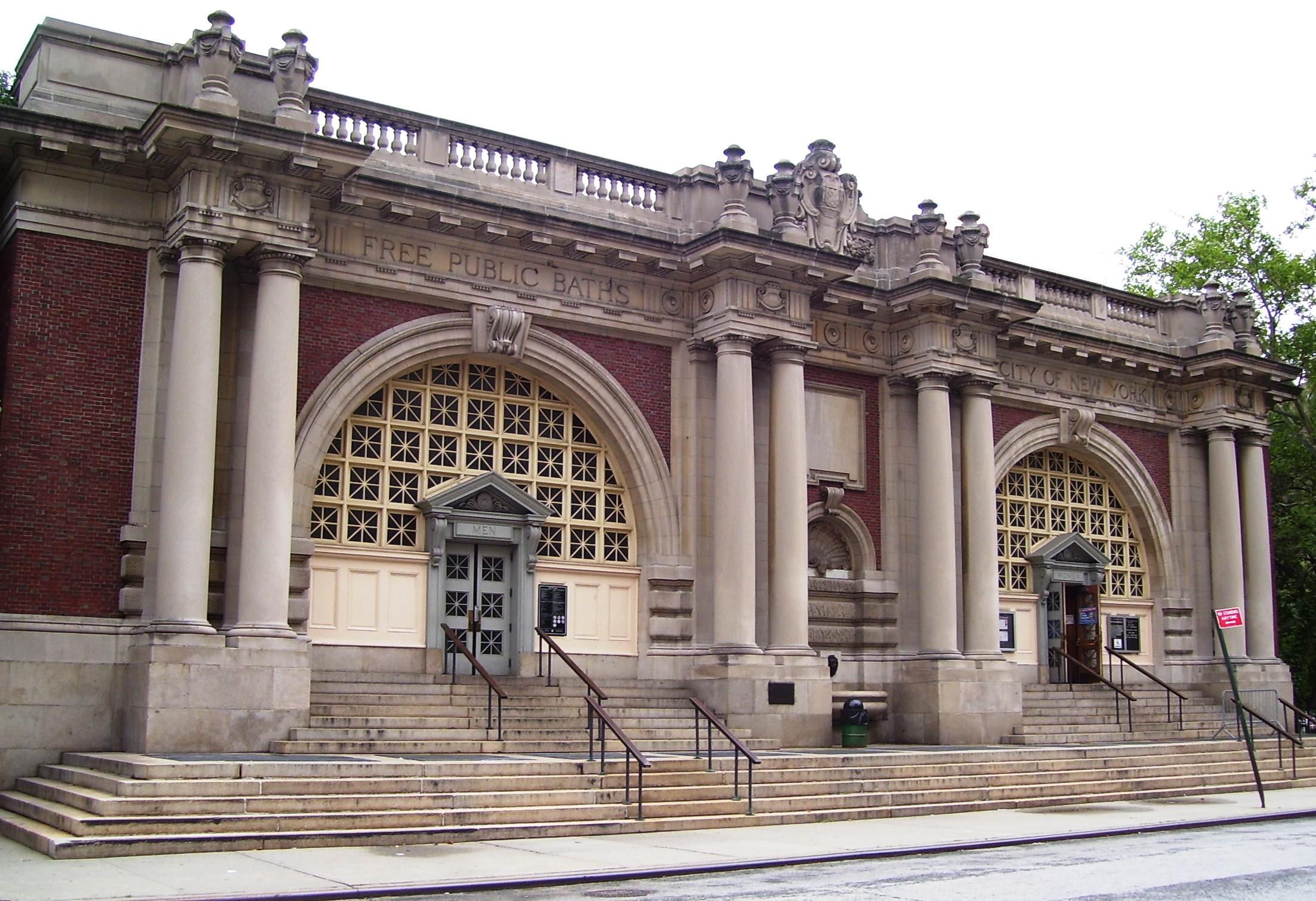
Asser Levy Recreation Center on East 23rd Street and Asser Levy Place, Manhattan. Built as a free public bath in 1904–1906 to relieve unsanitary slum conditions and named after Asser Levy, a prominent Jewish citizen of Dutch New Amsterdam and its English successor, New York City.

The first recorded Jewish settler in New Amsterdam was Jacob Barsimson, who arrived in August 1654 on the Dutch West India Company ship, the Peartree (de Pereboom), on a passport from the Dutch West India Company. A month later, a group of Jews came to New Amsterdam as refugees from Recife, Brazil. Portugal had just re-conquered Dutch Brazil (what is now known of the Brazilian State of Pernambuco) from the Netherlands, and the Jews living there fled the Portuguese Inquisition. A court record from September 7, 1654, shows that 23 Jews arrived on the St. Catherine, and were ordered to pay their freight and debts. Scholars differ on the exact route they took, but the text suggests they came via Cape St. Anthony, probably in Cuba, after earlier detention in Jamaica.

Upon the ship's arrival, Governor Peter Stuyvesant objected to their settlement, fearing their "customary usury" and that they may have been a burden, in their impoverished state. Jews in Amsterdam sent a petition to the Dutch West India Company, requesting permission for Jews to travel to and settle in the new colony. They argued that land was plentiful and adding more loyal individuals would help to facilitate the company's goal of expanding their colony. Stuyvesant's objections were overruled by the Company in an order issued February 15, 1655 and Jews were allowed to travel, trade and live in the colony. Still, numerous restrictions were imposed on them, and many left after a few years.

When the English took the colony from the Dutch in 1664, the only Jewish name on the requisite oath of loyalty given to residents was Asser Levy. This is the only record of a Jewish presence at the time, until 1680 when some of Levy's relatives arrived from Amsterdam shortly before he died. Asser Levy was the poorest of the first 23 Jewish Immigrants. He helped to file petitions that won the 23 immigrants the right to reside in New Amsterdam. As an advocate for Jews in the colony, the earliest mention of Asser Levy in a Court Record from New Amsterdam is September 15, 1654 as a plaintiff against unfair treatment of the Jewish immigrants. For example, Levy protested the policy of the exemption of Jews from enlisting in the army and being forced to pay an additional tax instead.

The first synagogue, the Sephardi Congregation Shearith Israel, was established in 1682, but it did not get its own building until 1730. Over time, the synagogue became dominant in Jewish life, organizing social services and mandating affiliation for all New York Jews. Even though by 1720 the Ashkenazim outnumbered Sephardim, the Sephardi customs were retained. In 1776, a majority of New York City's Jews were so patriotic that they voluntarily moved to Pennsylvania and Connecticut so as not collaborate with the British occupation of the city during the American Revolutionary War.

=== 1800–1881 ===
An influx of German and Polish Jews followed the Napoleonic Wars in Europe. B'nai Jeshurun, New York City's second synagogue and its first Ashkenazic synagogue, was founded in 1825. The late arrival of synagogues can be attributed to a lack of rabbis. Those who were interested in training as a Rabbi could not do so in America before this part of the century. Several other synagogues followed B'nai Jeshurun in rapid succession, including the first Polish one, Congregation Shaare Zedek, in 1839. In 1845, the first Reform temple, Congregation Emanu-El of New York opened. New York City would later become host to several seminaries of various denominations, where rabbis could be ordained, by the 1920s.

Jewish days schools began to appear in the 19th century across the United States, the first being the Polonies Talmud Torah in 1821. Numerous communal aid societies were also formed. These were usually quite small, and a single synagogue might be associated with more than a few such organizations. Two of the most important of these merged in 1859 to form the Hebrew Benevolent and Orphan Asylum Society (Jewish orphanages were constructed on 77th Street near 3rd Avenue and another in Brooklyn). In 1843 German Jews in New York established B'nai B'rith In 1852 the "Jews' Hospital" (renamed in 1871 Mount Sinai Hospital), which would one day be considered one of the best in the country, was established.

When the Civil War started about 7,000 Jews fought for the Union and about 1,500 for the Confederacy. After the Civil War, New York Jews were more religiously split with a Reform movement rising in popularity.

=== 1881–1945 ===
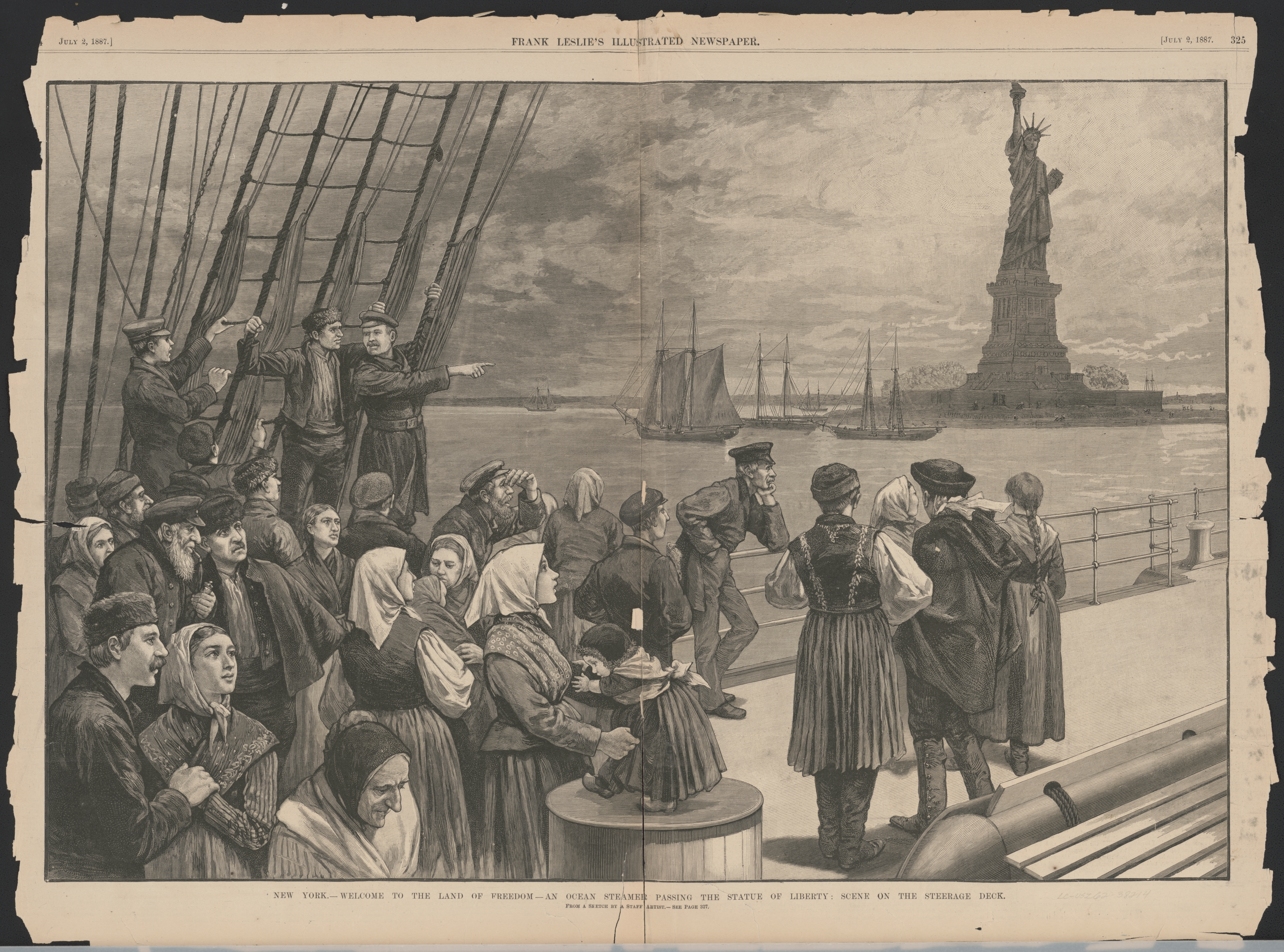
European Jewish immigrants arriving in New York in 1887

The 36 years beginning in 1881 experienced the largest wave of immigration to the United States ever. Following the assassination of Alexander II of Russia, for which many blamed "the Jews," there was a vast increase in anti-Jewish pogroms there — possibly with the support of the government — and numerous anti-Jewish laws were passed. The result was that over 2 million Jews immigrated to the US, more than a million of them to New York. Between 1880 and 1924, 2.5 million Ashkenazi Jews from the Russian Empire, Kingdom of Romania, and Austria-Hungary came to the United States and nearly 75 percent took up residence on the Lower East Side. The Jewish population in New York went from about 80,000 in 1880 to 1.5 million in 1920. This new mix of cultures changed what was a middle-class, acculturated, politically conservative community to a working-class, Yiddish-speaking group with a varied mix of ideologies including socialism, Zionism, and religious orthodoxy. The population of Jews eventually hit over one million by the 1900s and crowded into Jewish neighborhoods where they were not restricted from renting due to discriminatory policies that persisted until the end of World War II. The less-fortunate began to make the Lower East Side their own district as an influx of Jews reached the city between the 1870s and early 1900s.

The Jews of Central and Eastern Europe faced economic hardship, persecution, and social and political changes in the 1800s through the early 1900s, causing them to flee to the United States. In Russia, there were waves of pogroms between 1881 and 1921. Eastern Ashkenazi Jews and their culture flourished in New York at this time. Their congregations and businesses—namely shops selling Old World goods—firmly maintained their identity, language, and customs.

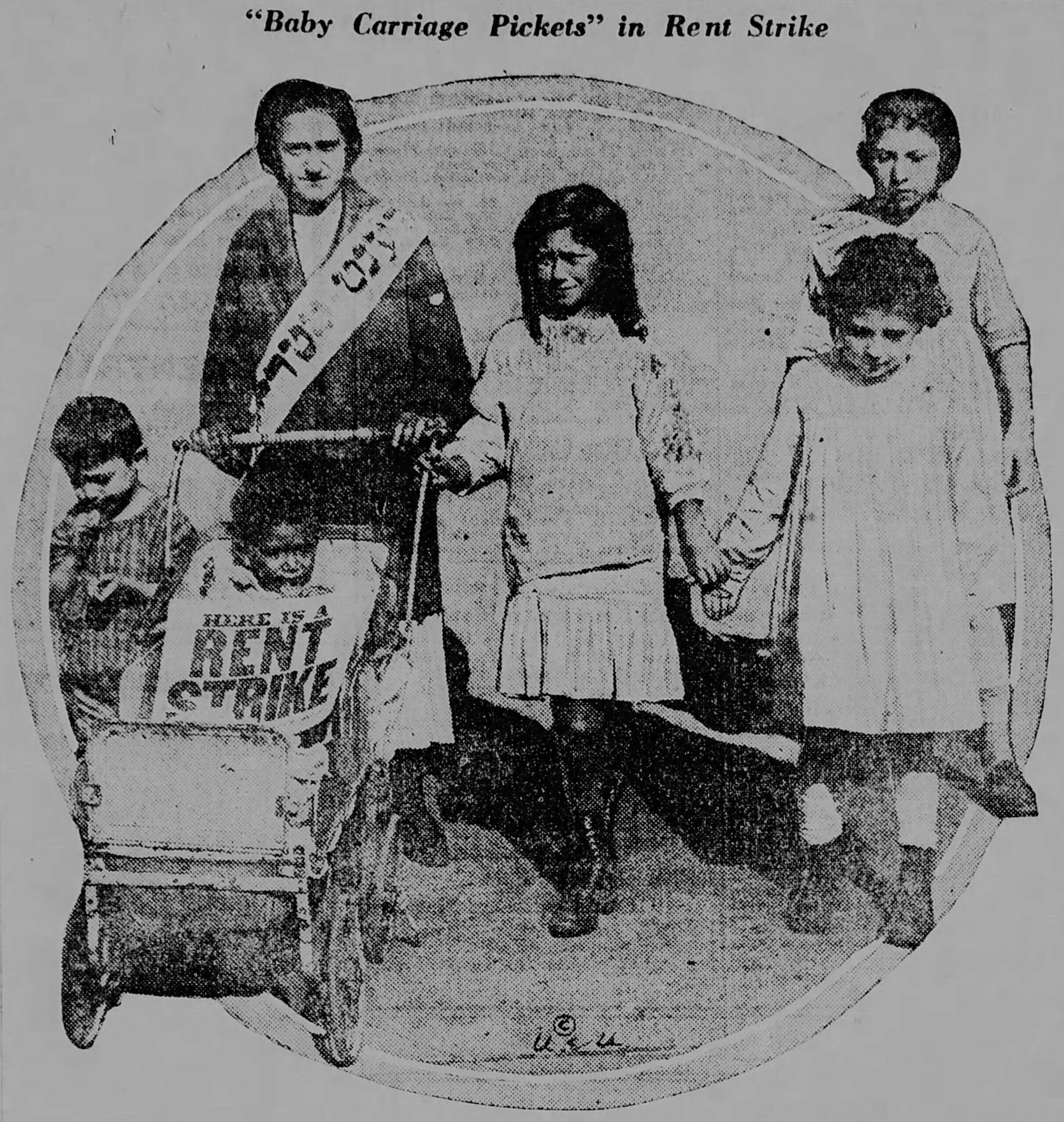
Rent striker with Yiddish protest sash, 1919

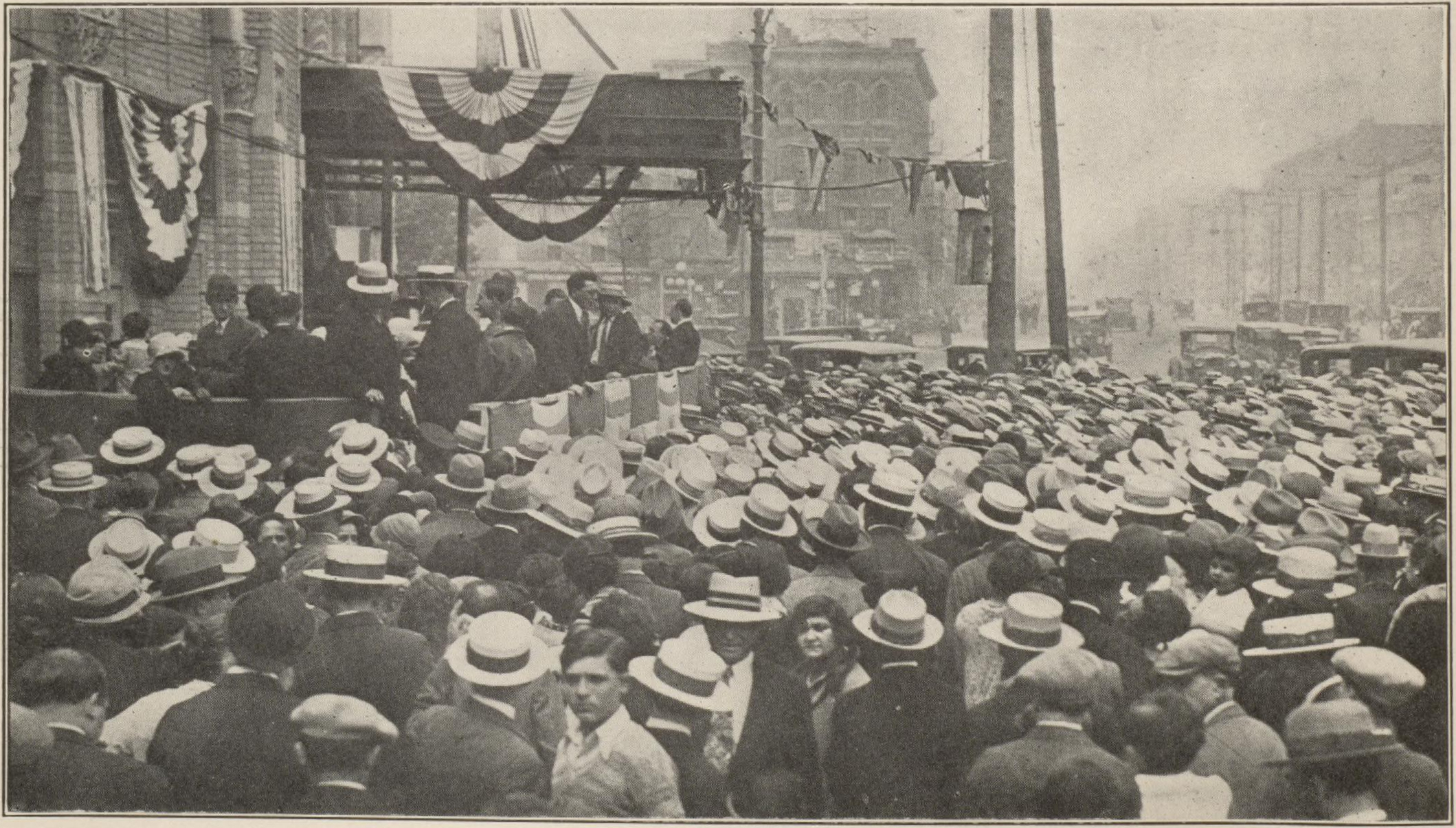
Forverts manager Baruch Charney Vladeck gives a speech at the cornerstone celebration of the Jewish-owned Rolland Theater, June 24, 1928

New York was the publishing city of the Yiddish newspaper, Forverts, first published in 1897. Several other Jewish newspapers followed and were being produced in common Jewish languages, such as Ladino, Yiddish, and Hebrew.

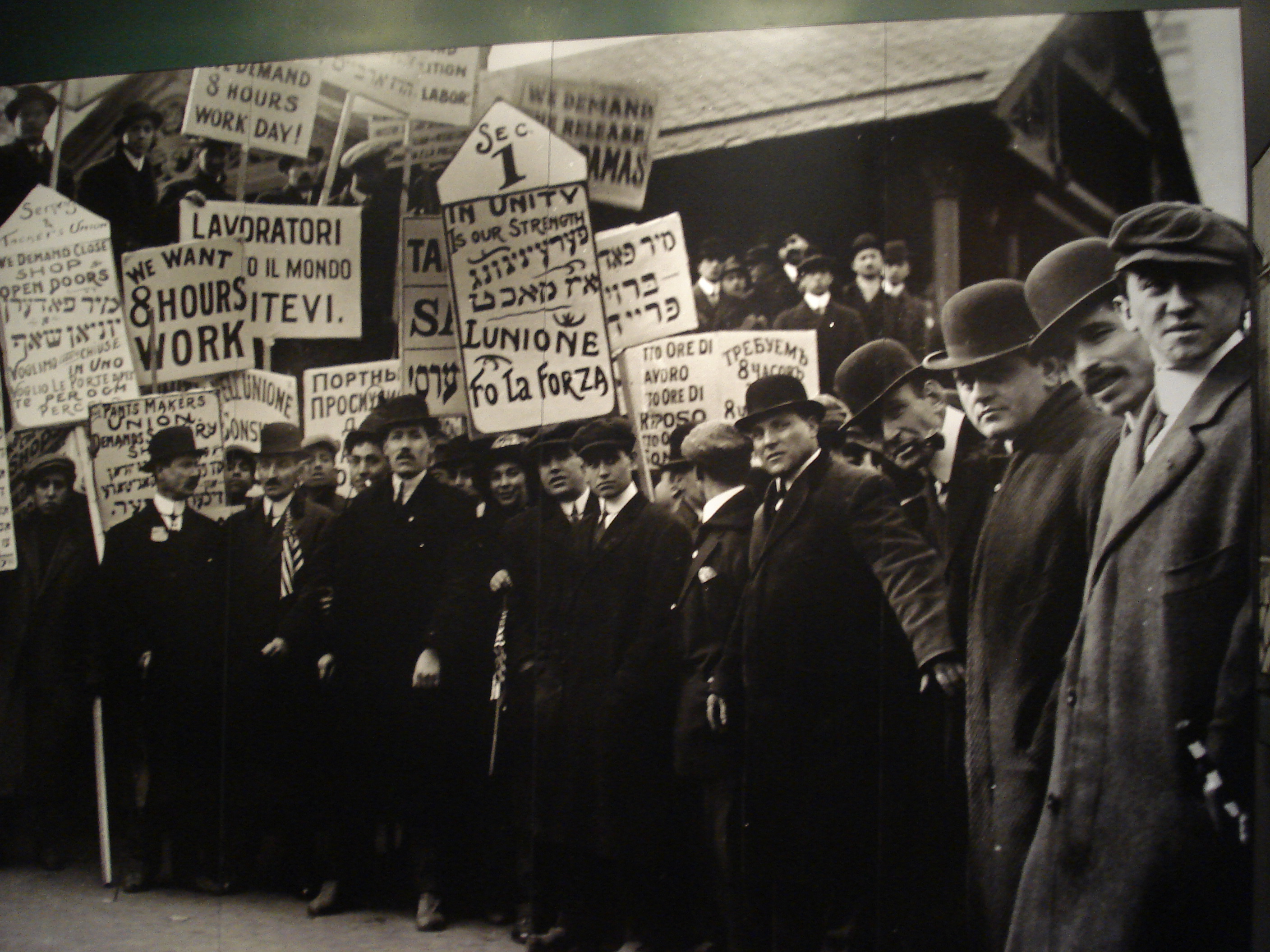
Jewish and Italian immigrant garment workers on strike, circa 1913

These immigrants tended to be young and relatively irreligious, and were generally skilled – especially in the clothing industry, which would soon dominate New York's economy. By the end of the nineteenth century, Jews "dominated related fields such as the fur trade."

The German Jews, who were often wealthy by this time, did not much appreciate the eastern Ashkenazi arrivals, and moved to uptown Manhattan en masse, away from the Lower East Side where most of the immigrants settled. Still, many of these Eastern European immigrants worked in factories owned by 'uptown' German Jews.

In 1940, 90% of New York State's 2,206,328 (1937 figure) Jews resided in the city. The next two decades saw a flow to the suburbs.

=== Growth in Hasidic Judaism ===
While some Hasidic Jews arrived in the US during earlier waves of Jewish immigration to the United States, most remained in Europe, and many of those who did immigrate assimilated into other branches of Judaism. However, the rise of the Nazis and the devastation of the Holocaust drastically altered this situation. Many Hasidim, including numerous community leaders, were murdered during the Holocaust, and most of the survivors fled to either the United States or Israel. Prominent figures who escaped to the United States included the sixth Chabad-Lubavitch Rebbe, Yosef Yitzchak Schneersohn, who in 1940 fled Nazi-occupied Poland for New York, aided by American diplomats who negotiated with the Nazis for his release. His son-in-law and successor, Menachem Mendel Schneerson, also escaped to New York from Paris via Portugal, arriving in 1941. Joel Teitelbaum, the Satmar Rebbe, escaped to Switzerland aboard the Kastner train and arrived in New York in 1946, following a brief stay in Jerusalem.

In New York City, major centers of Hasidic Judaism are found in Brooklyn, in particular the neighborhoods of Williamsburg, Crown Heights and Borough Park.

The Skverer Rebbe, Yakov Yosef Twersky, having also survived the Holocaust, arrived in New York in 1950, and settled in Williamsburg. In 1954, one of his followers purchased a dairy farm near Spring Valley, in the town of Ramapo, Rockland County, with the purpose of establishing a village for his followers, where they could escape the temptations of assimilation which they experienced in Williamsburg. The first families arrived in late 1956, and in 1961 it was incorporated as the village of New Square – the first Hasidic community to be incorporated in the United States. In the 1970 census, New Square's population was 1,156; by the 2020 census, it had increased to 9,679.

Similarly, in the 1970s, Teitelbaum founded a village for his followers in Orange County, known as Kiryas Joel; the first families arrived in 1974, and the village was legally incorporated in 1977. The village would grow extremely rapidly over the following decades, mainly due to its high birth rate–from a population of 2,088 in the 1980 census, to 32,954 in the 2020 census. The growth of the village led to conflicts with the town of Monroe to which it belonged; to help resolve those conflicts, the town of Palm Tree, coterminous with Kiryas Joel village, was separated from Monroe in 2019. For similar reasons, the Kiryas Joel School District was separated from Monroe-Woodbury Central School District in 1989.

In 1990, followers of the Vizhnitz Hasidic dynasty incorporated another village in the town of Ramapo, Kaser. In the 2000 census, the village's population was 3,316; by the 2020 census, its population had increased to 5,491. Another predominantly Hasidic area in Ramapo is the unincorporated area (hamlet) of Monsey, which grew from 8,797 in the 1970 census to 26,954 in the 2020 census.

== Periods of discord ==
=== New York City teachers' strike of 1968 ===
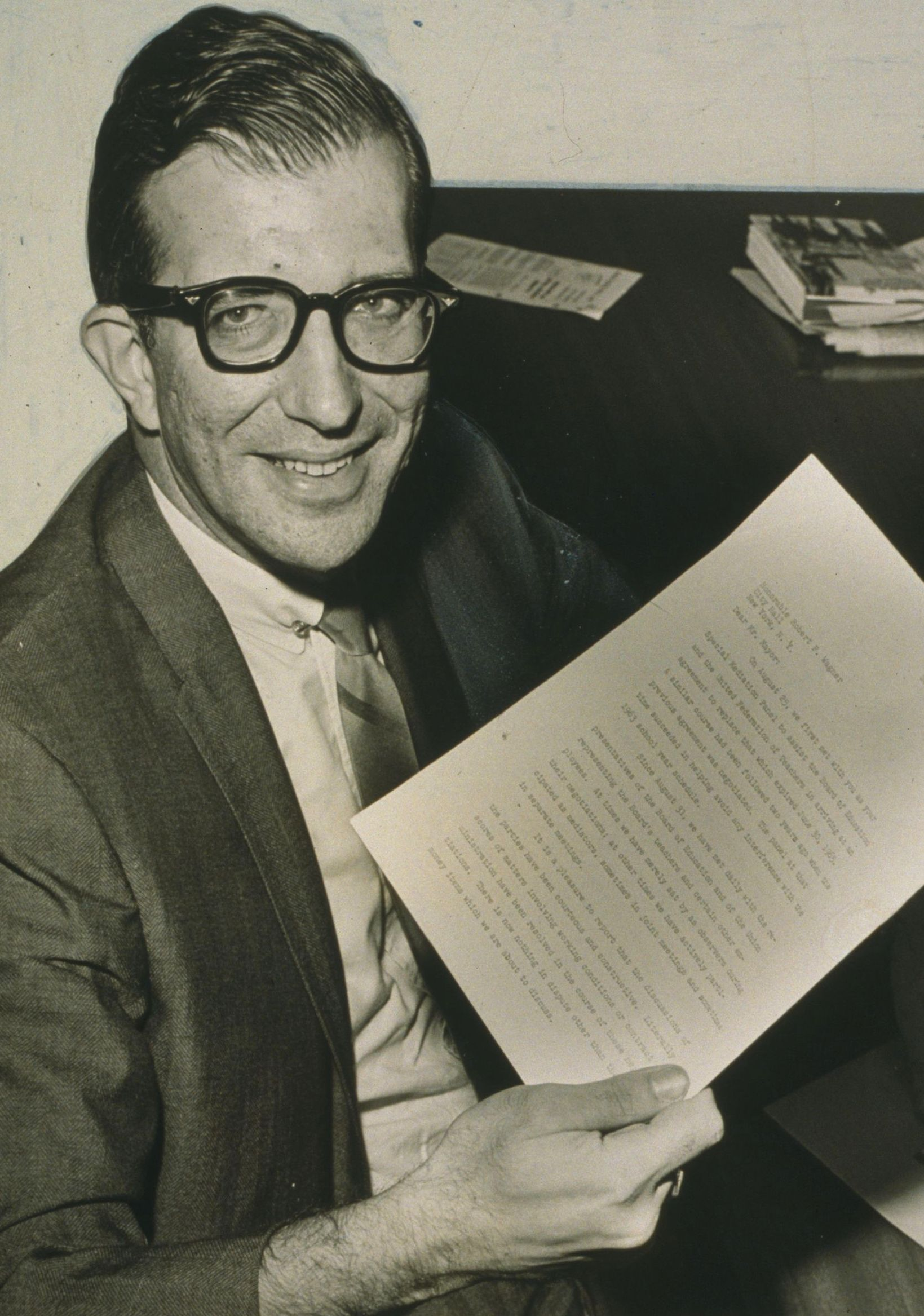
Albert Shanker

The 1968 New York City teachers' strike was a months-long confrontation between the new community-controlled school board in the largely black Ocean Hill–Brownsville neighborhoods of Brooklyn and New York City's United Federation of Teachers. It began with a one-day walkout in the Ocean Hill–Brownsville school district in May 1968, and escalated to a citywide strike in September of that year, shutting down the public schools for a total of 36 days and increasing racial tensions between Black and Jewish Americans.

Thousands of New York City teachers went on strike when the school board of the neighborhood, which is now two separate neighborhoods, fired nineteen teachers and administrators without notice. The newly created school district, in a heavily black neighborhood, was an experiment in community control over schools, and those dismissed were almost all Jewish.

The United Federation of Teachers (UFT), led by Albert Shanker, demanded the teachers' reinstatement and accused the community-controlled school board of antisemitism. At the start of the school year in September 1968, the UFT held a strike that shut down New York City's public schools for nearly two months, leaving a million students without schools to attend.

The strike pitted the community against the union, highlighting a conflict between the locals' right to self-determination and teachers' universal rights as workers. Although the school district itself was quite small, the outcome of its experiment had great significance because of its potential to alter the entire educational system—in New York City and elsewhere. As one historian wrote in 1972: "If these seemingly simple acts had not been such a serious threat to the system, it would be unlikely that they would produce such a strong and immediate response."

=== Crown Heights riot of 1991 ===
The Crown Heights riot was a race riot that took place from August 19 to August 21, 1991, in the Crown Heights section of Brooklyn, New York City. Black residents attacked Orthodox Jewish residents, damaged their homes, and looted businesses. The riots began on August 19, after two 7-year-old children of Guyanese immigrants were struck by a driver running a red light while following the motorcade of Rebbe Menachem Mendel Schneerson, the leader of Chabad, a Jewish religious movement. One child died and the second was severely injured.

In the immediate aftermath of the fatal crash, black youths attacked several Jews on the street, seriously injuring several and killing an Orthodox Jewish student from Australia. Over the next three days, black rioters looted stores and attacked Jewish homes. Two weeks after the riot, a non-Jewish man was killed by a group of black men; some believed that the victim had been mistaken for a Jew. The riots were a major issue in the 1993 mayoral race, contributing to the defeat of Mayor David Dinkins, an African American. Opponents of Dinkins said that he failed to contain the riots, with many calling them a 'pogrom' to emphasize what was seen as the complicity of New York City political leaders.

Ultimately, black and Jewish leaders developed an outreach program between their communities to help calm and possibly improve racial relations in Crown Heights over the next decade.

Amid earlier waves of urban unrest and antisemitic incidents in Brooklyn, including a string of firebombings targeting Jewish institutions in 1968, Crown Heights became a focal point of debate over Jewish flight from inner-city neighborhoods. Menachem Mendel Schneerson, leader of the Chabad-Lubavitch movement based in Crown Heights, publicly urged Jews to remain and invest in the community, saying that mass departure would erode communal strength citywide. His call to “stand firm and not run away” framed Crown Heights as a test case for urban Jewish continuity across the globe.

== Contributions ==
=== Jewish culture ===
Jewish people also found ways to carry on their traditions and introduce some cultural aspects to New York City.

The bagel was brought to the United States in the early 20th century and became so popular that it is now a worldwide export. The recipe was fiercely safeguarded by Bagel Bakers Local 338, a union of 300 bagel craftsmen based in New York.

=== Judaism ===
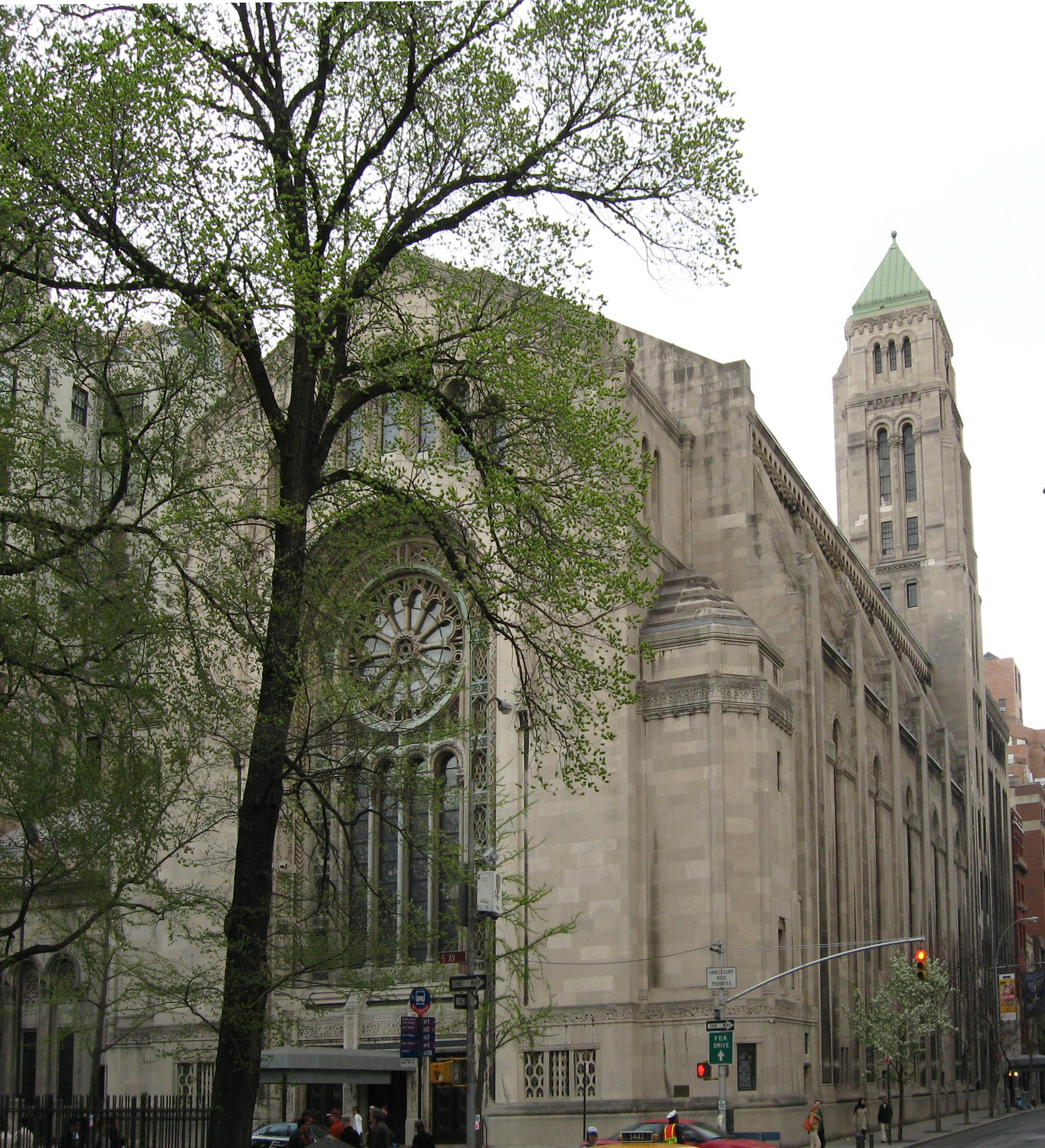
Temple Emanu-El

The first Jewish congregation in the city, Shearith Israel was established in 1654. Founded in 1845, Temple Emanu-El on 5th Avenue in Manhattan's Upper East Side is the oldest Reform Jewish congregation in New York City, which developed into the largest and most prestigious Reform congregation in the country. The Angel Orensanz Center, originally Anshe Chesed Synagogue, is situated on the Lower East Side and was the largest synagogue in the United States at the time of its construction. The building has been standing since 1849, making it the oldest surviving synagogue.

Borough Park's inhabitants are mostly Orthodox and Hasidic Jews. The area in southwestern Brooklyn first began to have a Jewish presence in the early 1900s. The Hasidic immigration started after World War II, with the arrival of survivors from Nazi extermination camps and Eastern European ghettos.

=== Science ===
Many Jews studied science and went to New York City, examples such as Otto Loewi, who moved to the United States in 1940, where he joined the faculty of New York University College of Medicine as a research professor of pharmacology. He was awarded the Nobel Prize in Physiology or Medicine in 1936, which he shared with Henry Dale.

=== Literature and theater ===
In the late 1800s to the early 1900s, people of the Jewish faith began to spread their art of theater throughout New York City. The Yiddish Theater was established in the Yiddish language in 1903, used by Jews in central and eastern Europe before the Holocaust. The Yiddish theater consisted mostly of Jewish people and settlers in New York performing Yiddish drama, and folktales, and expanding theatrical culture throughout the city.

Numerous Jewish actors and playwrights in the 20th and 21st centuries have influenced the theater world. Notable examples include Tony Curtis, Stephen Sondheim, Scarlett Johansson and Barbra Streisand.

=== Opera ===
In the realm of grand opera, several Jewish vocalists in New York City assumed a prominent role on the international concert hall stage while also striving to preserve Yiddish folk songs on recordings for future generations. Included in this group were such musicians as: Jan Peerce, Richard Tucker and Sidor Belarsky.

== See also ==
- American Jews
- Demographics of New York City
- History of Jews in the United States
- List of Orthodox Jewish communities in the United States
