= Solomon Franco =

Solomon Franco was a Jewish convert to Anglicanism who combined his interest in Kabbalah with support for the English monarchy.

In 1649, Solomon Franco moved from New Amsterdam (later New York City) to become the first Jew recorded as living in the Boston area. However he was soon paid off by Puritans of the General Court, provided he set sail for Holland within a few weeks.

Although a Rabbi, in 1668 he converted to Anglicanism, publishing Truth springing out of the earth in the same year. A second edition was published in 1670.
