= Sephardic Jews in the United States =

Languages
- American English, Hebrew, Aramaic, Spanish, Portuguese, and Arabic

Religion
- Judaism (Sephardic rite)

Related ethnic groups
- Jews, American Jews, Sephardic Jews, Mizrahi Jews, Israeli Jews, Anglo-Israelis

Sephardim are the oldest Jewish community in the United States of America, having first arrived during the colonial era.

As of 2025, around 10% of American Jews are Sephardic and/or Mizrahi per the non-profit organization Jews Indigenous to the Middle East and North Africa.

== History ==
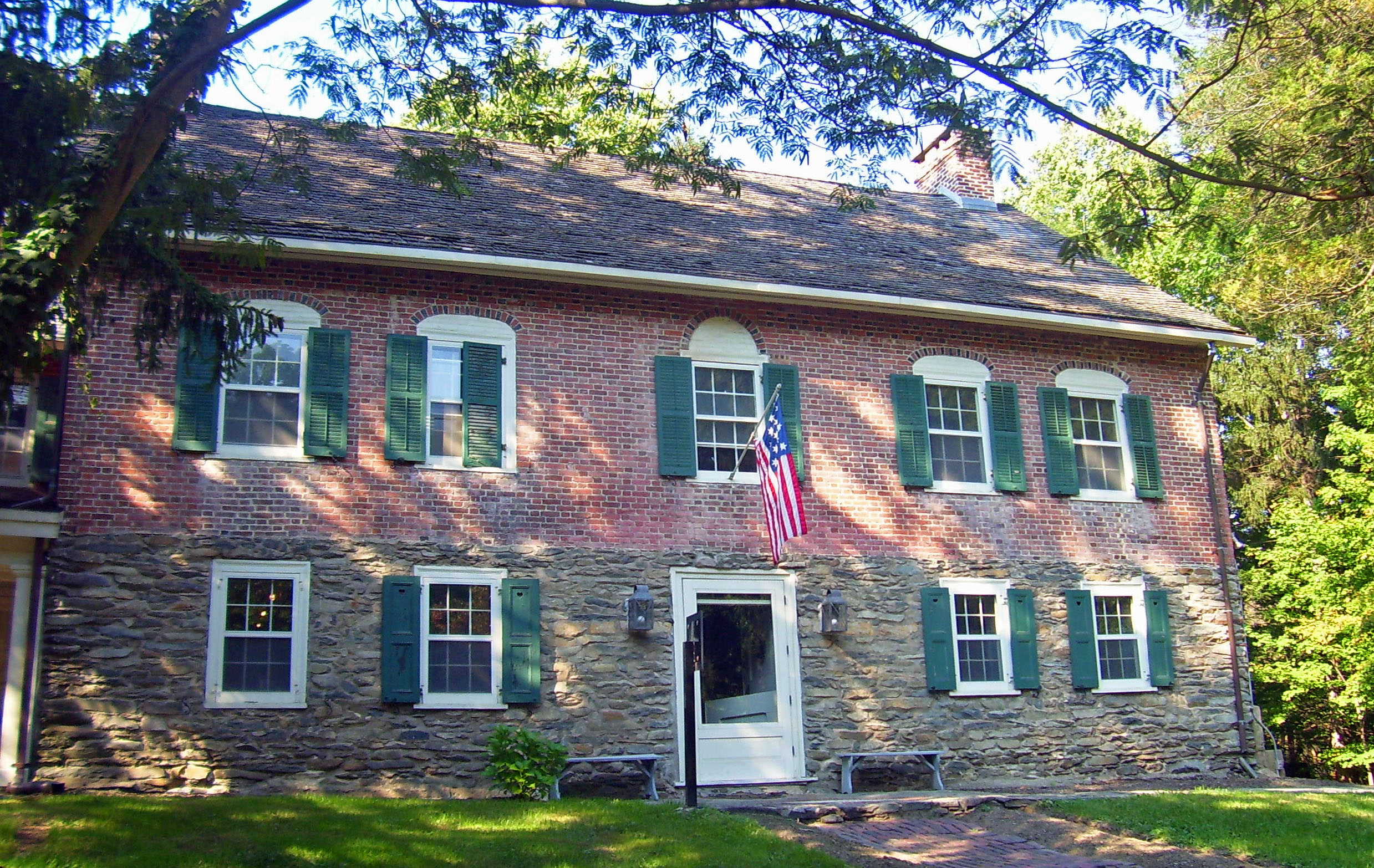
Gomez Mill House in Newburgh, NY, USA. One of the earliest known residences of a Jew in the future United States of America.

=== Initial settlements ===
The first Jews to arrive in North America were 23 Sephardim who fled religious persecution in Brazil after the Portuguese took over and brought the Inquisition in1654. They landed a few days before Rosh Hashana. Among the prominent people who came were Asser Levy, Luis Moses Gomez, Moses and Samuel Levy.

=== Rise of the Reform ===
Not all Spanish-Portuguese were as dedicated to tradition as their fellow congregants. Some, such as Isaac Harby, openly called for reform. Changes included English services, as he claimed that many could not even understand the Hebrew language. Much of his support for reform was due to his belief that his community was ill educated on their own religion and Spanish-Portuguese customs, therefore being defenseless against Protestant missionaries.

== Contributions to George Washington's success ==
Several Sephardim participated in the American Revolutionary War such as Francis Salvador, Haym Salomon, and Moses Seixas. Haym Salomon is considered to be one of the main financiers of the Revolutionary War and key to the success of Washington's Yorktown campaign.

Francis Salvador was the first Jew killed in the Revolutionary War.

In 1790, Moses Seixas, the president of Touro Synagogue wrote to George Washington to praise the religious freedoms in the Bill of Rights. Washington responded affirming that the U.S. government gives "to bigotry no sanction, to persecution no assistance"—anchored Jews firmly within American religious liberty.

Gershom Mendes Seixas, brother of Moses Seixas, was the cantor of Congregation Shearith Israel, in New York and participated in George Washington's inauguration. He was also one of the founders of Columbia College.

== Culture, traditions, and customs ==
=== Language ===
Despite the name, most Spanish-Portuguese in the United States do not speak Spanish nor Portuguese, and any vestiges of either language remain only in the Hebrew pronunciation and traditional liturgy. An example, Benjamin Nathan Cardozo, a notable Spanish-Portuguese lawyer and traditionalist, "confessed in 1937 that" after centuries in British North America, "his family preserved neither the Spanish language nor Iberian cultural traditions". His ancestors had lived in England, the British colonies, and the United States since the 17th century.

Some Spanish table songs, most famously Bendigamos, are still sung by many Spanish-Portuguese. However, Bendigamos is believed to have originated among the S&P community of Bordeaux, France and originally was sung in French.

Unlike the Eastern Sephardim, the Spanish-Portuguese do not traditionally speak Ladino, but rather standard Spanish and Portuguese.

==== Clerical terminology ====
Hazzanim in the S&P rite are given the title of "Reverend". For much of the community's history in America, communities were led by hazzanim who were not ordained rabbis.

=== Dress ===
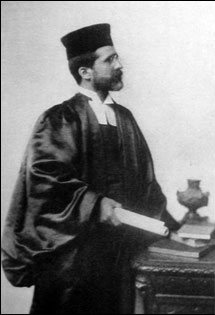
R' Henry Pereira Mendes wearing the traditional robes of Spanish-Portuguese clergy.

Traditionally, Spanish-Portuguese clerical attire consists of canonical robes, a top hat, and/or tricorn depending on the specific community and occasion.

==== Silk prayer shawl ====
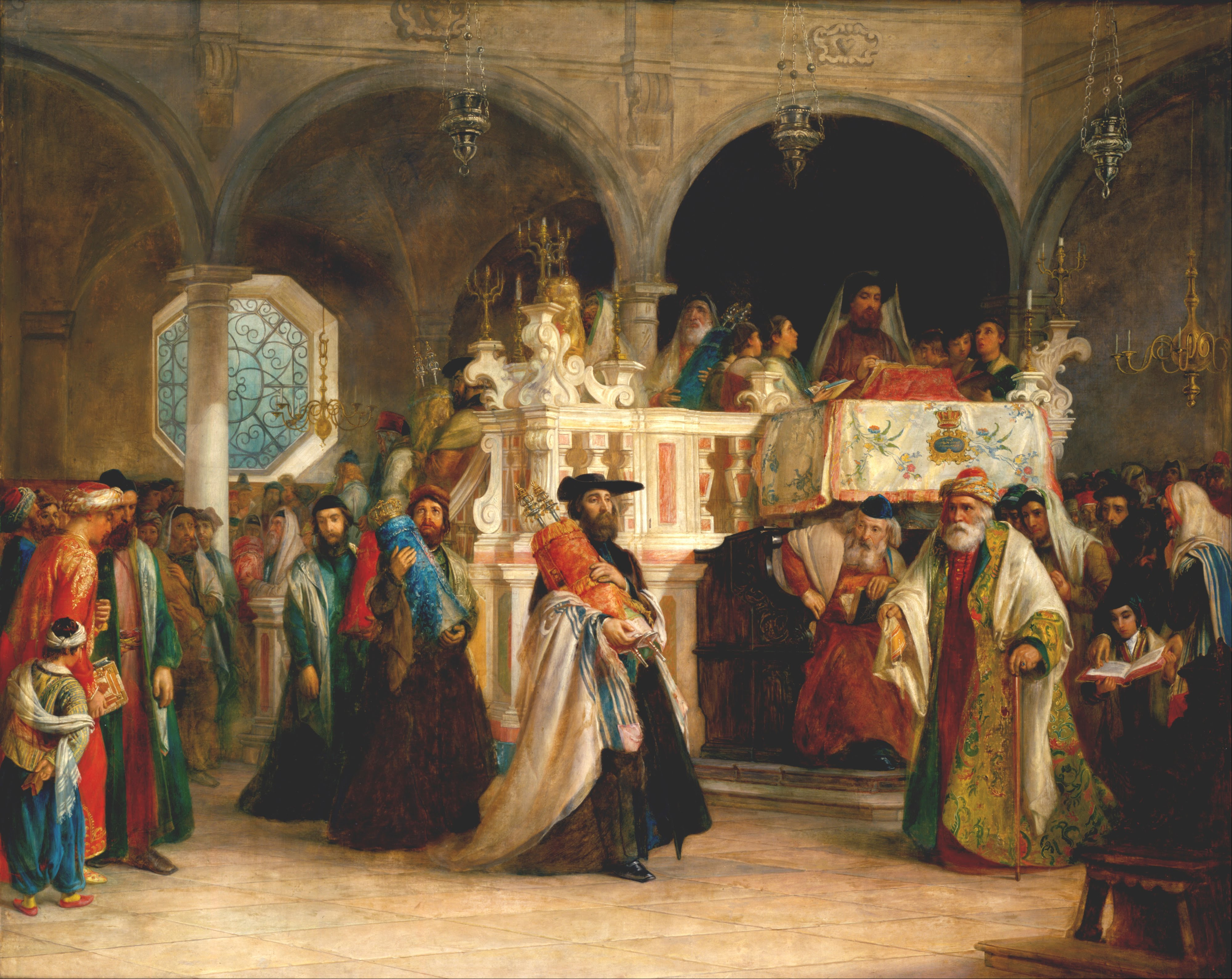
The silk tallitot used by the Livorno S&P community are similar to the American S&P.

The traditional material used in the production of tallitot (prayer shawls) in Spanish-Portuguese communities in the United States, as well as others, is silk. It is theorized that the material contributed to the unique S&P way of donning the shawl.

=== Traditionalism ===
Spanish-Portuguese communities place a heavy emphasis on the preservation of Western Sephardic liturgical customs and religious traditions, despite the fact that Spanish-Portuguese communities in the US have always included Ashkenazim.

=== Thanksgiving service ===
Congregation Shearith Israel has been conducting Thanksgiving services since President George Washington first instituted the holiday in 1789.

=== Architecture ===
Traditionally, Spanish-Portuguese synagogue architecture was based on older structures, such as the Portuguese Synagogue of Amsterdam and the Great Synagogue of Livorno.

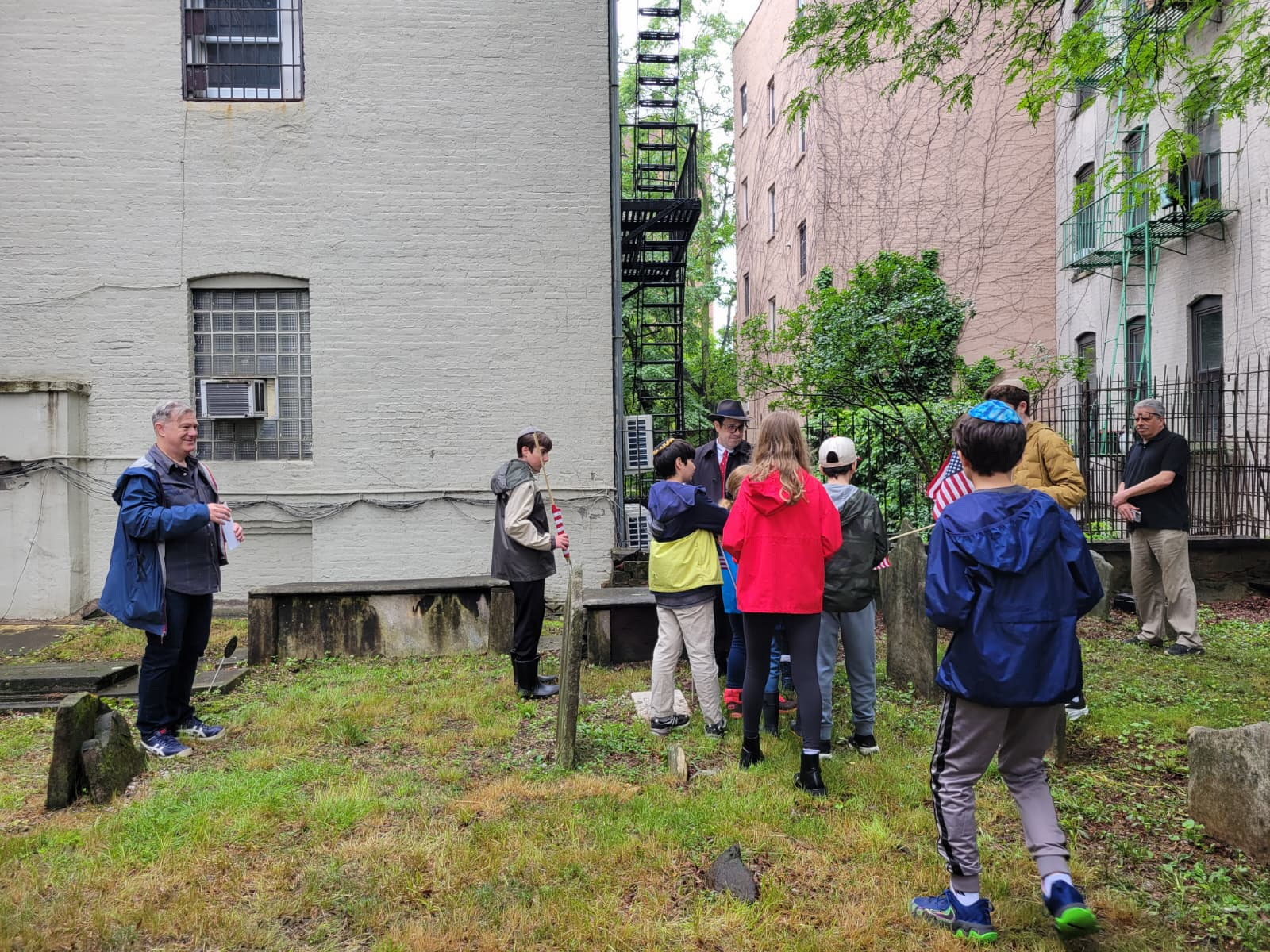
Spanish-Portuguese Jewish youth place flags on the graves of fallen Jewish veterans at the First Shearith Israel Graveyard during Memorial Day 2026.

=== Memorial Day ===
Every year, Shearith Israel hosts a Memorial Day ceremony in honor of veteran members of the community, notably those who perished during the American Revolutionary War. The event is attended by the Sons of the Revolution in the State of New York color guard.

=== Cuisine ===
Spanish-Portuguese cuisine in colonial America largely mirrored that of their fellow colonists, albeit with alterations to follow the laws of kashrut. Commonly eaten foods included corn, beans, fish, preserved fruit, preserved vegetables, and pickled vegetables.

== Halakhic approach ==
Though there is no uniquely Spanish-Portuguese approach to halakha, historically the predominant stream of Judaism in the community has been rationalist and Maimonidean. Kabbalah is also notably absent from the S&P rite.

== By region ==
=== Midwest ===
John Jacob Hays and Samuel Judah were two prominent Indiana settlers, having migrated to the region from New York.

=== West Coast ===
==== The San Francisco Grandees ====
Spanish-Portuguese Jews began establishing themselves in California along with their fellow settlers in the 19th century. One such settler was Charleston-born, Abraham Cohen Labatt, who established several Reform communities throughout the southern states and San Francisco.

== Modern communities ==
- Congregation Shearith Israel
- Congregation Mikveh Israel

== Historical communities ==
- Kahal Kadosh Beth Elohim (Reform)
- Touro Synagogue (Reform)
- Congregation Mickve Israel (Reform)
- Touro Synagogue (Orthodox, Ashkenazi)
- The Hebrew Congregation of St. Thomas (Reform)
- Congregation Beth Ahabah (Reform)

== Institutions and organizations ==
=== Theological ===
- Orthodox Union - Founded by R' Henry Pereira Mendes
- Institute for Jewish Ideas and Ideals - Founded by Rabbi emeritus of Shearith Israel, Marc D. Angel
- International Rabbinic Fellowship - Co-founded by Rabbi Marc. D Angel

=== Historical ===
- Gomez Foundation for Mill House - Runs the Gomez Mill House museum

=== Philanthropic and charitable ===
- Hebra Hased Va’Amet (Hebrew Benevolent Society) - Oldest active Jewish philanthropic organization in New York City

=== Political ===
- Tikvah Fund - Conservative organization whose senior scholar is Rabbi Meir Soloveichik of Shearith Israel

=== Educational ===
- Jewish Theological Seminary of America (Historically) - Founded by R' Sabato Morais and R' Henry Pereira Mendes
- Polonies Talmud Torah School - First Hebrew school in America
- Emet Classical Academy - Jewish preparatory school in Manhattan founded by the Tikvah Fund
- Yeshiva University's Sephardic Community Program - Co-founded by Hakham of the Spanish and Portuguese Jews of the British Commonwealth Solomon Gaon
- The Habura - Beit midrash founded by Senior Spanish-Portuguese Rabbi of the United Kingdom Joseph Dweck

=== Namesakes ===
- Touro University - Named after businessman and philanthropist Judah Touro
- Benjamin N. Cardozo School of Law - Named after Associate Justice of the Supreme Court Benjamin N. Cardozo

== Publications ==
- An Old Faith in the New World: Portrait of Shearith Israel 1654-1954 - Rabbi David de Sola Pool and Tamar de Sola Pool
- Why I am a Jew by Rabbi David de Sola Pool
- The Kaddish by Rabbi David de Sola Pool
- Book of Prayer by Rabbi David de Sola Pool
- The Unchanging Law, Shearith Israel's Heritage and Hope by Rabbi David de Sola Pool
- Seeking Good, Speaking Peace by Rabbi Marc D. Angel
- The Jewish Religion: Ethically Presented by Rabbi Henry Pereira Mendes
- Esther and Harbonah by Rabbi Henry Pereira Mendes
- A discourse delivered before the congregation Mikvé Israel of Philadelphia, at their synagogue in Seventh street, on Thursday, June 1, 1865, the day appointed for fasting, humiliation, and prayer, for the untimely death of the late lamented President of the United States, Abraham Lincoln by Rabbi Sabato Morais
- Correspondence of Sabato Morais, 1887 by Rabbi Sabato Morais

== Websites ==
=== Liturgy, customs, and traditions ===
- Congregation Shearith Israel - Liturgy- Liturgy of Congregation Shearith Israel

=== General ===
- S&P Central- Information hub for Spanish & Portuguese / Western Sephardic Jewish Communities

== Media ==
- Book of Negroes (miniseries) - Features Solomon Lindo, an indigo planter and slaveowner, who comes to own the protagonist
- Field of Lost Shoes - Features Moses Ezekiel, Confederate VMI cadet and later sculptor

== Notable individuals and families ==
=== Families ===
- Seixas
- Hays
- Judah
- Gomez
- Hart
- Guedalia

=== Individuals ===
- Rabbi David de Sola Pool - Former rabbi of Congregation Shearith Israel
- Judah Touro - Businessman and philanthropist
- Benjamin N. Cardozo - Associate Justice of the Supreme Court
- Isaac Harby - Advocate for Reform Judaism
- Lee Cohen Harby - Writer
- Jacob De Cordova - Politician
- Judah P. Benjamin - Politician, lawyer, and 3rd Confederate Secretary of State
- Moses Jacob Ezekiel - Sculptor
- Edwin Warren Moïse - Lawyer, Confederate officer, and Adjutant-General from South Carolina
- Francis Salvador - Politician and revolutionary
- David Levy Yulee - Politician and lawyer
- Emma Lazarus - Poet
- Rabbi Isaac Leeser - Religious leader
- Rabbi Sabato Morais - Co-founder of the Jewish Theological Seminary
- Rabbi Henry Pereira Mendes - Co-founder of the Orthodox Union and Jewish Theological Seminary
- Haym Salomon - Founding Father and merchant
- Rabbi Marc D. Angel - Rabbi emeritus of Congregation Shearith Israel
- Rabbi Meir Soloveichik - Current rabbi of Congregation Shearith Israel
- Rabbi Hayyim Angel - Former rabbi of Congregation Shearith Israel and professor at Yeshiva University
- SFC Yosef Malachi Guedalia - IDF soldier and victim of the October 7th massacre
- Rabbi Shalom Morris - Rabbi of Bevis Marks Synagogue
- Rabbi Joseph Dweck - Senior rabbi of the Spanish-Portuguese community of the United Kingdom
- Hazzan Gershom Mendes Seixas - First native-born Jewish religious leader in the United States
- Maud Nathan - Labor activist, suffragist, and social worker
- Jacob Lumbrozo - Colonial Maryland physician, farmer, and trader
- CPT Uriah P. Levy - First Jewish Commodore of the United States Navy
- Lawrence Ferlinghetti - Poet
- William Pereira - Architect
- Abraham Pais - Physicist and science historian
- Josh Pais - Actor
- Josephine Lazarus - Essayist, book critic, transcendentalist, and Zionist
- Solomon Nunes Carvalho - Painter, photographer, author, and inventor
- Isaac Lopez Brandon - One of the earliest recorded Jews of African descent in the United States
- Jao de la Porta - Merchant
- Jean Lafitte - Pirate and privateer
- Vic Seixas - Tennis player
- Theodore Solomons - Explorer and early Sierra Club member
- Arthur Hays Sulzberger - Publisher of the New York Times from 1935 to 1961
- Rabbi Isaac Touro - Religious leader and British Loyalist
- Hazzan Jacques Judah Lyons - Religious leader, composer, historian
- Judah Monis - First Hebrew instructor in North America
- David L. Lopez - Builder, industrialist, slaveowner, and philanthropist
- Aaron Lopez - Merchant, slave trader, and philanthropist
- Morris Lazaron - Reform rabbi and writer
- Joel Rinaldo - Founder of Joel's Bohemia
- Benjamin Nathan - Investor, philanthropist, and murder victim
- Henri Castro - Diplomat and Texas empresario
- Mordecai Manuel Noah - Sheriff, playwright, diplomat, journalist, and utopian
- Daniel De Leon - Socialist writer and unionist
- Lewis Charles Levin - Founder of the Know Nothings
- Lewis Morrison - Actor and only black Jewish officer in both the United States and Confederates States Army

=== Notable non-Jewish descendants ===
- Eslanda Goode Robeson - Anthropologist, author, actress, and civil rights activist
- Vic Seixas - Tennis player
- Jackie Walker - Political activist and writer
- Mathias de Sousa - First colonist of African descent to vote in an American legislature
- Paul Robeson Jr. - Author, archivist, and historian
- Joachim Pissarro - Art historian, curator, theoretician, and educator
- Harry Belafonte - Singer, actor, and civil rights activist
- Thomas Cardozo - Politician and educator
- Henry Cardozo - Politician and Methodist minister
- Constance Bennett - Actress and producer
- Joan Bennett - Actress
- Coriell and Coryell family - Descendants of Jacob Curiel in the United States

== See also ==
- History of the Jews in the Southern United States
- Military history of Jewish Americans
- Old Stock Americans
- First Families of Virginia
- Boston Brahmin
- New Netherlander
