= History of the Jews in Charleston, South Carolina =

The history of Jews in Charleston, South Carolina, was related to the 1669 charter of the Carolina Colony (the Fundamental Constitutions of Carolina), drawn up by the 1st Earl of Shaftesbury and his secretary John Locke, which granted liberty of conscience to all settlers, and expressly noted "Jews, heathens, and dissenters". Sephardi Jews from London were among the early settlers in the city and colony, and comprised most of its Jewish community into the early 1800s.

By the early 19th century, Charleston was home to the largest Jewish community in the United States, making the city a major center of Jewish religious, cultural, and civic life. Although Jews never comprised a majority of the population—making up only a few percent—they held an outsized influence in commerce, philanthropy, and religious leadership. Over time, the city’s Jewish community continued to exist and grow slowly, but Charleston lost its national prominence as much larger Jewish populations developed in cities such as New York, Philadelphia, Chicago, and later in South Florida and the New Jersey suburbs. Today, the Jewish community in Charleston remains active and institutionally complete, with synagogues, schools, and organizations, though its relative size and prominence are smaller compared to the city’s overall population and to larger American Jewish centers.

== History ==
The earliest record of a Jew in Charleston occurs in 1695, when one is recorded as acting as interpreter for Governor John Archdale. The Jewish interpreter was interpreting between English and Spanish for a group of Yamasee who had captured four Spanish-speaking Yamasee to sell as slaves in Barbados and Jamaica.

In 1702 Jews appeared in numbers and voted at a general election. The early Jewish communities in the South were made up primarily of Sephardic Jews who had immigrated from London and the Netherlands, where they had settled following expulsion from Spain and Portugal in the late 15th century.

The Jewish community at Charleston received a substantial addition during the years 1740–41. Following a Spanish invasion of Georgia in 1733, many Jews moved to Charleston, as they feared another Inquisition. In addition, the illiberal policy of the trustees of Georgia induced both Jews and Christians to leave that colony and to flock to South Carolina. During the mid-1700s, Charleston was the preferred destination of Jewish emigres from London, who represented numerous wealthy merchant families. They became involved in business, trade, finance and agriculture in Charleston, with some owning plantations.

By 1800 there were about 2,000 Jews in South Carolina (overwhelmingly Sephardic and settled in Charleston), which was more than in any other U.S. state at that time, and more than any other town, city, or place in North America. As a community of wealthy Jewish people in Charleston grew, residents formed the Society for the Relief of Orphans and Children of Indigent Parents, later known as the Hebrew Orphan Society, in 1801. This development comes after a splintering of children's orphanages after Catholics and Jews moved to establish institutions of their own because of the decidedly Protestant operation of Charleston's only public orphanage, Charleston Orphan House. A study of the Orphan House's records showed evidence of only two Jewish children residing in the orphanage after discovering papers of commissioners rejecting a request allowing these children from leaving the orphanage to attend Jewish services on a weekly basis. The desire to establish alternatives to public orphanages for Jewish children was therefore driven by a growing push from the Jewish community to care for coreligionist children in private homes, as opposed to public institutions. These may have reflected the exclusivist social attitudes of their neighbors in the city. For example, Congregation Kahal Kadosh Beth Elohim in 1820 would not accept as converts any free people of color, thus rejecting the mixed-race children of Jewish men and African-American women.

Charleston remained the unofficial capital of North American Jewry until about 1830, when the increasing number of Ashkenazi German Jews emigrating to America settled largely in New Orleans, Richmond, Savannah, Baltimore, and the Northeast (particularly in Boston, New York City and Philadelphia). Their numbers, added to by the later immigration of Ashkenazi Jews from eastern Europe to the Northeast and Midwest industrial cities, far surpassed the mostly Sephardic Jewish community in Charleston.

South Carolina was the first place in America to elect a Jew to public office: Francis Salvador, elected in 1774 and 1775 to the Provincial Congress, in 1776 died in action as the first Jewish American killed in the Revolution. The state also claims to be the birthplace of Reform Judaism in the Americas, although this is generally associated more strongly with the seminary in Cincinnati, Ohio.

== First synagogue ==
The first synagogue established at Charleston was that of the Kahal Kadosh Beth Elohim, founded in 1749. Several of its founders had come from Georgia, migrating after that colony was invaded by Spanish forces, as they feared another Inquisition. Its first hazan or cantor was Isaac da Costa; and among its earliest members were the following: Joseph and Meshod Tobias, Moses Cohen, Abraham da Costa, Moses Pimenta, David de Olivera, Michael Lazarus, and Abraham Nuñez Cardozo. The DaCosta family was prominent in London and sponsored the emigration of Jews to South Carolina, where it had bought much land.

The Beth Elohim congregation is still operating, and it has the second oldest synagogue building in the U.S., and the oldest in continuous use. Its first synagogue was a small building on Union Street. Its present edifice is situated at 90 Hasell St. The Jews of Charleston at an early date also established a Hebrew Benevolent Society, which still survives.

While the earliest congregation was composed mainly of Portuguese Jews, the German element soon became prominent. Even before 1786 the city possessed not only a Portuguese congregation (Sephardic), but a distinct German-Jewish (Ashkenazi) one as well. The Jewish community soon became very prosperous, and before the Revolution several Jews had acquired wealth and gained distinction. Among these was Moses Lindo, inspector-general and surveyor of indigo, drugs, and dyes for South Carolina.

Rabbi Burton Padoll, who served as the synagogue's rabbi during the 1960s, was an outspoken activist for the rights of African Americans. Rabbi Padoll was forced to resign as rabbi after prominent members of the congregation objected to his support for the civil rights movement.

== War of Independence ==
During the American Revolutionary War the Jews of Charleston joined the cause of independence. The majority did good service in the field, several as officers. The most prominent Jew at the outbreak of the war was Francis Salvador, who had a 7,000-acre plantation in Ninety-Six District. He had established relations with the leaders of the Revolutionary movement at Charleston, and was elected to the first and second Provincial Congresses, which met in that city. He was one of the leading patriots of the American South.

In 1779 a special corps of volunteer infantry was composed largely of Jews who resided on King St in the city of Charleston. Among its Jewish members were David N. Cardozo, Jacob I. Cohen, and Joseph Solomon. This body subsequently fought under General, Colonel at that time, William Moultrie at the battle of Sullivan's Island, South Carolina, one of the most significant early battles of the revolution, it has been remembered every year on June 28, since the first anniversary of the battle in 1777. There is a monument located in White Point Garden, to those who fought that day. Others who served in the field included Jacob de la Motta, Jacob de Leon, Marks Lazarus, the Cardozos, and Mordecai Sheftall, who was deputy commissary-general of issues for South Carolina and Georgia. He was properly a resident of Savannah, Georgia rather than of Charleston. Major Benjamin Nones, a French Jew in Kazimierz Pułaski's regiment, distinguished himself during the siege of Charleston and won the praise of his commander for gallantry and daring. Mordecai Myers was also prominent at this period.

In 1790 the Jews of Charleston sent an address of congratulation to George Washington upon his accession to the presidency. In 1791 the congregation of Beth Elohim, then numbering fifty-three families, was incorporated by the legislature; and in 1794 its synagogue was consecrated at a ceremony attended by General William Moultrie and many of the chief dignitaries of the state.

Shortly after this period, Charleston attracted other Jews from New York, Virginia, and elsewhere, owing to its commercial opportunities and the welcome of the large Jewish community already established there. Until about 1830 or so, Charleston had the largest Jewish population of any city in the United States.

== State officials ==
During the early portion of the nineteenth century, several Charleston Jews held high offices in the state. Among these were Myer Moses, elected to the state legislature in 1810, and later appointed as one of the first commissioners of education; Abraham M. Seixas, a magistrate; and Lyon Levy, state treasurer.

Other prominent Charleston Jews during the early part of the nineteenth century were: Penina Moise, born in 1797, who became widely known as a poet, and Mordecai Cohen, in whose memory the city of Charleston erected a tablet in the Orphan House in recognition of his charity. Charleston Jews also rendered valuable service during the War of 1812 and in the Mexican–American War.

At the outbreak of the American Civil War, the Jewish community in Charleston joined their non-Jewish neighbors in the Confederate cause. Among the prominent soldiers of the Confederacy were General Edwin Warren Moïse and Dr. Marx E. Cohen.

After the war, leaders included Gen. Edwin Warren Moïse, adjutant-general of the state of South Carolina from 1876 to 1880; Franklin J. Moses, Sr. (born Israel Franklin Moses), who became chief justice of the South Carolina supreme court in 1868; and his son Franklin J. Moses, Jr., governor of South Carolina from 1872 to 1874.

In 1902 Charleston had fewer than 2,000 Jews, a population smaller than 86 years earlier in 1816.

== Reform, Beth Elohim and the courts ==
The first Jewish Reform movement in the United States originated in Charleston. In 1824 a large number of the members of Congregation Beth Elohim petitioned its trustees to shorten the service and to introduce the English language. The petition was rejected. The petitioners resigned and organized the Reform Society of Israelites. David Nuñez Carvalho was the first reader of the society; but the most influential man in the movement was Isaac Harby, a distinguished journalist and playwright. He was editor of The Quiver, The Charleston Mercury, and several other publications.

In the 1840s there was a major split in Congregation Beth Elohim, which many historians of American Jewish history see as the beginning of the American Reform movement. The conflict began after the introduction of an organ into the synagogue when it was rebuilt following a fire in 1840. The series of conflicts between Reform and Traditionalist elements in Beth Elohim resulted in a complicated dispute between the President, who favored Reform, and the Board of Trustees, which was controlled by the Traditionalists. The President refused to call the Board of Trustees to meet (as was required by the synagogue's constitution) because he knew they would admit new traditionalist, members and obtain control of the congregation. The Board ignored him and met on their own, a move which the Reformers challenged in court.

The resulting case, State v. Ancke, has become known as an early example of U.S. courts refusing to intervene in complex religious questions. The ruling was more complicated. Judge A.P. Butler, delivering the opinion for the South Carolina Court of Appeals, ruled that the Board had violated the synagogue's constitution by meeting without the President's approval. He ruled the admission of the new members was invalid. While some have claimed that the decision ignored the question of religious disagreement and focused on the legal question, the case's strong endorsement of progress and change in religious ceremony and observance seems to show that the Court's (or at least Butler's) sympathies lay with the reformers. The decision resulted in the formation of a new congregation by the more traditional members, known as "Shearith Israel". In 1866, it reunited with the old congregation.

== Notable Jews from Charleston ==
- Robert F. Furchgott, scientist, born in Charleston 1915, winner of the 1998 Nobel Prize in Medicine.
- Elias Marks, physician and educator.
- Moses Lindo, Inspector General of Indigo, Drugs and Dyes
- Penina Moïse, a poet and writer.
- Moses Cohen Mordecai, a businessman, politician, and parnas (synagogue administrator).
- Billy Simmons, an African-American Jew who attended Kahal Kadosh and was a scholar in Hebrew and Arabic.
- Sarah Visanska, a clubwoman who served as president of the South Carolina Federation of Women's Clubs from 1910 to 1912.

== See also ==
- Jews in the Southern United States
- John Henry Devereux, an architect who designed the Brith Sholom Beth Israel Synagogue.
