= Harby =

Harby may refer to:

== Places ==
- Harby, Leicestershire, England
  - Clawson, Hose and Harby, a civil parish in Leicestershire
  - Harby and Stathern railway station, a former station in Leicestershire
- Harby, Nottinghamshire, England
  - Doddington and Harby railway station, a former station on the Notts-Lincs border
- Hårby, Denmark
- Harby near Kalmar in Sweden

== People ==
- Harby baronets
- Arthur Harby (1906–1989), English rower
- Harold Harby (1894–1978), Norwegian-born Los Angeles councillor
- Isaac Harby (1788–1828), American teacher, playwright, literary critic etc.
- Kathryn Harby-Williams (born 1969), Australian netball player and TV presenter
- Lee Cohen Harby (1849–1918), American writer
