= Sarah Brandon Moses =

African-American Jew in New York City

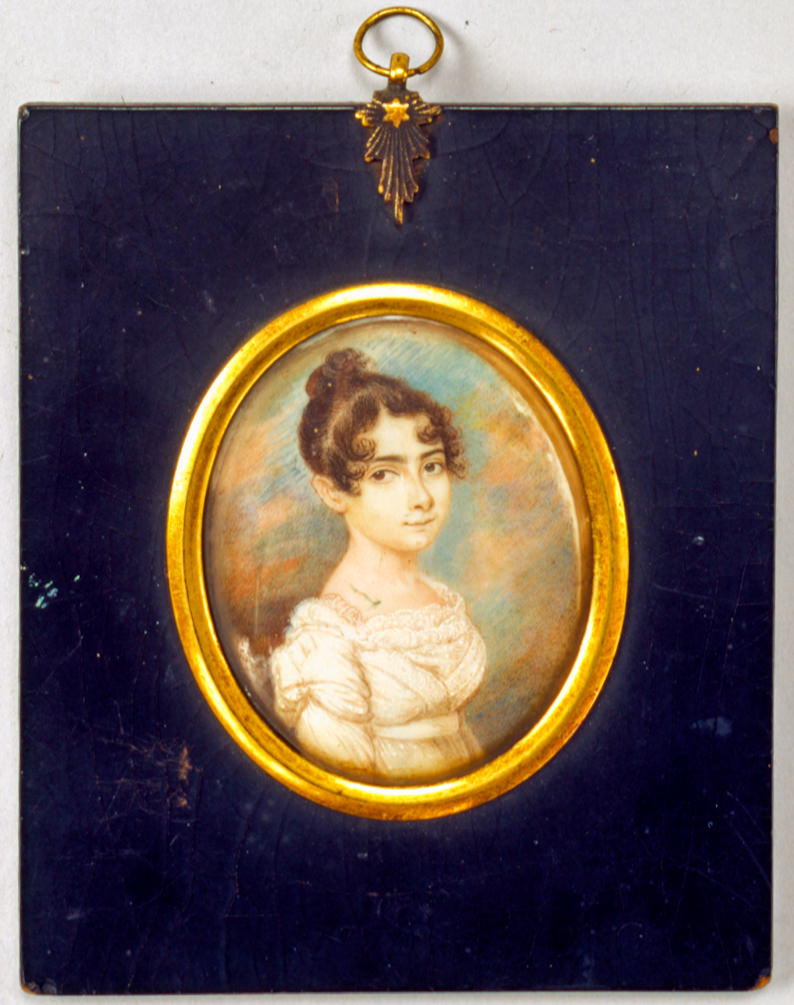
- Born: 1798
- Died: 1828
- Spouse: Joshua Moses
- Father: Abraham Rodrigues Brandon

Sarah Brandon Rodrigues Moses was a Barbadian-born Jew, one of the earliest recorded Jewish women of African descent in American history. Born in Barbados, she and her brother Isaac Lopez Brandon went on to become part of the Sephardic upper class in New York City. Portraits of her and her brother Isaac are the earliest known paintings of Jews of African descent in North American history.

== Life ==
Moses was born in Bridgetown, Barbados in 1798. Her mother, Esther Gill (Sarah Esther Lopez), was a mixed-race Black woman enslaved by the Sephardic slave owner Hannah Esther Lopez. The Lopez family also enslaved her brother Isaac, grandmother Jemima Gill, and great-grandmother Deborah Lopez. The Lopez family lived near Nidhe Israel Synagogue, the heart of the Barbadian-Jewish community. Her father, Abraham Rodriguez Brandon, was a Sephardic slave owner, the wealthiest Jew in Barbados, parnas (synagogue president) of Nidhe Israel, and friend of the Lopez family. Neither Moses nor her mother was born Jewish, since the Jewish community of Barbados forbade Black people to convert to Judaism. She was baptized as an Anglican shortly following her birth and released from slavery. Moses' maternal grandfather was a white Anglican; upon his death, Esther Gill inherited a home and slaves of her own.

In either 1811 or 1812, Sarah and her brother Isaac relocated to Paramaribo in the Dutch colony of Suriname and underwent formal conversions to Judaism. Sarah was 13 and her brother Isaac was 19. Synagogue records from Suriname list both siblings as converts and as Portuguese Jews. Following her conversion, her father sent her to Greater London in 1815 to receive an education at an elite Sephardic girls' school. Once in England, Sarah had servants of her own. While in England, she and her brother's portraits were painted. In the paintings, the painter used a technique to exaggerate the lightness of their skin. At age 18, Sarah married a wealthy American Ashkenazi Jew named Joshua Moses, the son of German-born American banker Isaac Moses; their wedding occurred at Bevis Marks Synagogue, the Portuguese synagogue in London. Her wedding dowry was £10,000, or approximately $30 million in 2020.

Moses' husband worked with Stephen Girard, a wealthy French-American banker, who moved them to Manhattan in 1817. In Manhattan, she gave birth to 10 children. She died in 1828 at age 30. Moses' mother Esther had died in 1823 and was buried as a Jew in New York City. On United States Census records, Moses and her family are listed as "white".

== Legacy ==
The portrait of Moses is a watercolor on ivory painting. The artist is unknown. It is held by the American Jewish Historical Society in Manhattan.

In 2020, the historian Laura Arnold Leibman wrote The Art of the Jewish Family, a chapter of which is about Moses and her family.

== See also ==
- Black Jews in New York City
- History of the Jews in Barbados
- Billy Simmons
- Lucy Marks
