= Isaac Lopez Brandon =

African-American Jew in New York City

Isaac Lopez Brandon was a Barbadian-born Jew, one of the earliest recorded Jews of African descent in American history. Born in Barbados, he and his sister Sarah Brandon Moses went on to become part of the Sephardic upper class in New York City. Portraits of him and his sister are the earliest known paintings of Jews of African descent in North American history. In Barbados, Brandon fought for the equal civil rights of the Jewish minority.

== Life ==
Brandon was born in Bridgetown, Barbados. His mother, Esther Gill (Sarah Esther Lopez), was a Black woman enslaved by the Sephardic slave owner Hannah Esther Lopez. The Lopez family also enslaved his sister Sarah, grandmother Jemima Gill, and great-grandmother Deborah Lopez. The Lopez family lived near Nidhe Israel Synagogue, the heart of the Barbadian-Jewish community. His father, Abraham Rodriguez Brandon, was a Sephardic slave owner, the wealthiest Jew in Barbados, parnas (synagogue president) of Nidhe Israel, and friend of the Lopez family. Neither Moses nor his mother was born Jewish, since the Jewish community of Barbados forbade Black people to convert to Judaism. He was released from slavery at age 9. Moses' maternal grandfather was a white Anglican; upon his death, Esther Gill inherited a home and slaves of her own.

In either 1811 or 1812, Isaac and his sister Sarah relocated to Paramaribo in the Dutch colony of Suriname and underwent formal conversions to Judaism. Synagogue records from Suriname list both siblings as converts and as Portuguese Jews. Following his conversion, his father sent him to Greater London to receive an education at an elite Sephardic school. While in England, he and his sister's portraits were painted. In the paintings, the painter used a technique to exaggerate the lightness of their skin.

In the 1820s, Brandon married Lavinia Moses, the daughter of the banker Isaac Moses. His sister Sarah married Lavinia's brother Joshua Moses. Lavinia died in 1828 while giving birth to their daughter who was also named Lavinia. Brandon's daughter Lavinia died at age 2 and Brandon never remarried.

On United States Census records, Brandon and his family are listed as "white".

== Legacy ==
The portrait of Brandon is an oil on ivory painting. The artist is unknown. It is held by the American Jewish Historical Society in Manhattan.

In 2020, the historian Laura Arnold Leibman wrote The Art of the Jewish Family, a chapter of which is about Brandon and his family.

== See also ==
- Black Jews in New York City
- History of the Jews in Barbados
- Billy Simmons
- Lucy Marks
