= David L. Lopez =

Builder, industrialist, slave owner, philanthropist, and defender of the Confederacy

- Born: January 16, 1809; Charleston, South Carolina, U.S.
- Died: April 21, 1884 (aged 75); Philadelphia, Pennsylvania, U.S.
- Occupations: Builder; carpenter; contractor; industrialist; mining superintendent
- Years active: 1834–1884
- Known for: Construction of Kahal Kadosh Beth Elohim (KKBE) synagogue; Farmers' and Exchange Bank; Institute Hall (Secession Hall); Confederate superintendent of state works
- Political party: Democratic
- Spouse(s): Catherine Dobyn Hinton (m. 1832; died 1843) Rebecca Moise (m. 1846; died 1858)
- Children: 12 (including John Hinton, Moses E., David III, Aaron M., Julian L., Edward H., and Priscilla)
- Parents: David Lopez Sr. (father); Priscilla Moses Lopez (mother)
- Relatives: Aaron Lopez (half-great-uncle); Sally Lopez (sister); David Lopez Cohen (nephew)

David L. Lopez (1809-1884) was a builder, industrialist, slave owner, philanthropist, and defender of the Confederacy who lived in Charleston, South Carolina.

He constructed numerous significant buildings in Charleston, including the second Kahal Kadosh Beth Elohim synagogue (1839–1841), which was the first synagogue in the Americas built by a practicing Jew.

== Early life ==
Lopez was born on January 16, 1809, in Charleston, South Carolina, into a religiously observant Sephardi Jewish family of Portuguese descent. His father, David Lopez Sr. (1750–1812), died when David Jr. was two, leaving his mother, Priscilla Moses Lopez (1775–1866), along with older siblings and household slaves, to raise him. His father's will bequeathed him an enslaved boy named Mathew and two Union Bank shares, making him a slave owner from age two. His paternal half-uncle was Aaron Lopez, a wealthy merchant and philanthropist in Rhode Island.

David Lopez Sr. had been president of Kahal Kadosh Beth Elohim (KKBE) and a founding president of Charleston's Hebrew Orphan Society. The Lopez family were shomer Shabbat (Sabbath-observant) and followed Sephardic Orthodox traditions, belonging to KKBE's traditionalist faction in opposition to the reformers who formed the Reformed Society of Israelites. Despite this divide, Lopez's eldest brother Moses provided financial assistance for Judah P. Benjamin to attend Yale College.

The family owned a six-volume Hebrew Bible (chumash) with Spanish commentary, published in Amsterdam ca. 1726, suggesting Lopez was familiar with Hebrew and Spanish in addition to English. As a youth, he attended KKBE's first synagogue, described in 1833 by a visiting observer as having a central bimah, lively Hebrew chanting, congregants wearing tallitot and hats, and an energetic atmosphere.

In 1832, Lopez married Catherine Dobyn Hinton of Edgefield, South Carolina, a non-Jew who did not convert—unusual for the era but not unheard of. They had six children, two of whom died in infancy. After Catherine's death in 1843, he married Rebecca Moise in 1846, with whom he had six more children. Despite intermarriage, Lopez remained an active member of the synagogue.

== Career ==
In 1834, Lopez began advertising his services as a carpenter and joiner in local newspapers. It remains unclear where he learned his trade—his father had owned a store selling architectural ornaments, and his great-uncle Aaron Lopez had experimented with prefabricated housing, but neither was directly involved in building construction. By 1834, he was advertising for five to six carpenters to work for him. He purchased his first enslaved carpenters, Kit and George, in 1837 and 1839 respectively.

The Great Fire of 1838 launched Lopez's career. His first architecturally significant project was the second KKBE synagogue (1839–1841), built on the same parcel as the first. The Greek Revival design by Cyrus L. Warner was selected, with Lopez as contractor. This was the first synagogue in the Americas erected by a practicing Jew. Enslaved laborers, including skilled carpenters Kit and George, worked on the building, as documented by "Negro hire" payments in KKBE's minute books. Highly skilled enslaved individuals also repaired Torah finials and painted the Ten Commandments on the east wall.

The installation of an organ at KKBE in 1841 sparked controversy. Lopez and his brother Moses were initially members of the Hebrew Harmonic Society that raised funds for the organ, but they later sided with the traditionalist faction that left to form Shearit Israel in 1846. However, Lopez did not build the breakaway synagogue; his nephew, David Lopez Cohen, did. Lopez's first wife, a non-Jew, was refused burial in Shearit Israel's new cemetery, so Lopez purchased adjacent land for a family burial ground.

Lopez constructed many buildings throughout Charleston, including his own house with indoor plumbing (a rare innovation), the Browning & Leman Department Store (1852), the Farmers' and Exchange Bank (1853–1854, a National Historic Landmark), and Institute Hall (1854), where the Ordinance of Secession was signed in 1860. He also built Zion Presbyterian Church (1858–1859), a congregation of enslaved people, making it likely the second church in the Americas built by a practicing Jew. Architect Edward C. Jones collaborated with Lopez on several projects.

He used enslaved workers, both as manual laborers and as skilled craftsmen, and owned fourteen enslaved people by 1860. In 1864, he advertised a $200 reward for the return of an enslaved carpenter named Jim, whom he claimed to have raised himself.

== Civil War ==
Lopez played a crucial role in preparing Confederate defenses. In 1861, he was summoned by Governor Pickens to rebuild gun carriages at Fort Moultrie after Major Robert Anderson had burned them. He was subsequently involved in constructing siege and coastal defense works around Charleston harbor.

In March 1862, Lopez was appointed South Carolina's general superintendent of state works. He selected Greenville as the site for a state armory due to its access to iron ore, timber, water power, and railroad connections, as well as its remoteness from enemy forces. He built a complex of more than fifteen buildings and recruited skilled workers, including enslaved mechanics. By 1863, the Greenville Armory employed 144 workers, eighty of whom were enslaved. Lopez also acquired machinery from Nashville's captured armory.

Lopez was dismissed in August 1863 following an altercation in which his son Moses threatened an employee with a gun. The incident involved a dispute over spoiled bacon, and though Lopez was exonerated regarding the bacon, the confrontation led to his termination.

== Later life ==
Following the Civil War, Lopez helped repair KKBE's synagogue and was elected president of the Hebrew Orphan Society (1866–1868). In 1868, he resigned from KKBE over the congregation's move toward Reform, objecting to "a mode of worship not (in my conception) ever contemplated by the contract made between the two Congregations." He also resigned from KKBE due to the hiring of Joseph Haim Chumaceiro, whom he likely viewed as too liberal.

From 1870 until his death, Lopez served as superintendent of the Coosaw Mining Company, developing underwater mining technologies and managing over six hundred employees. His son Moses assisted him, and together they made the company profitable, positioning South Carolina prominently in the phosphate mining industry. By 1881, the company was valued at over one million dollars.

Lopez died suddenly on April 21, 1884, while on a trip to Pennsylvania. His estate was the subject of a lawsuit among his children, which reached the South Carolina Supreme Court. He was buried in the family burial ground originally purchased for his first wife.

== Legacy ==
Lopez constructed numerous significant buildings, including two National Historic Landmarks: KKBE synagogue and the Farmers and Exchange Bank. Other buildings he built, including the South Carolina Institute Hall, 141 East Bay Street, the Browning & Leman Department Store, Zion Presbyterian Church, and the Greenville Armory, were destroyed or demolished. He used enslaved workers, both as manual laborers and as skilled craftsmen. He also trained his sons and nephew in the building trades.

The Kahal Kadosh Beth Elohim synagogue in Charleston was constructed by enslaved people owned by Lopez. In 2020, a monument was installed at the site of the synagogue to commemorate the forced human labor of Black Africans in the construction of the site, as well as the cleaning of silver casings used to contain the Torah scroll. Rabbi Stephanie Alexander said: "We're being honest and transparent about what has enabled us to come together and has enabled us to come to this space."

Lopez served as the first president of the Hebrew Orphan Society of Charleston, the oldest continually existing incorporated Jewish charity in the United States.

== See also ==
- History of the Jews in Charleston, South Carolina
