= Mikveh Israel Cemetery =

Jewish cemetery in Philadelphia, US

- U.S. National Register of Historic Places
- Pennsylvania state historical marker
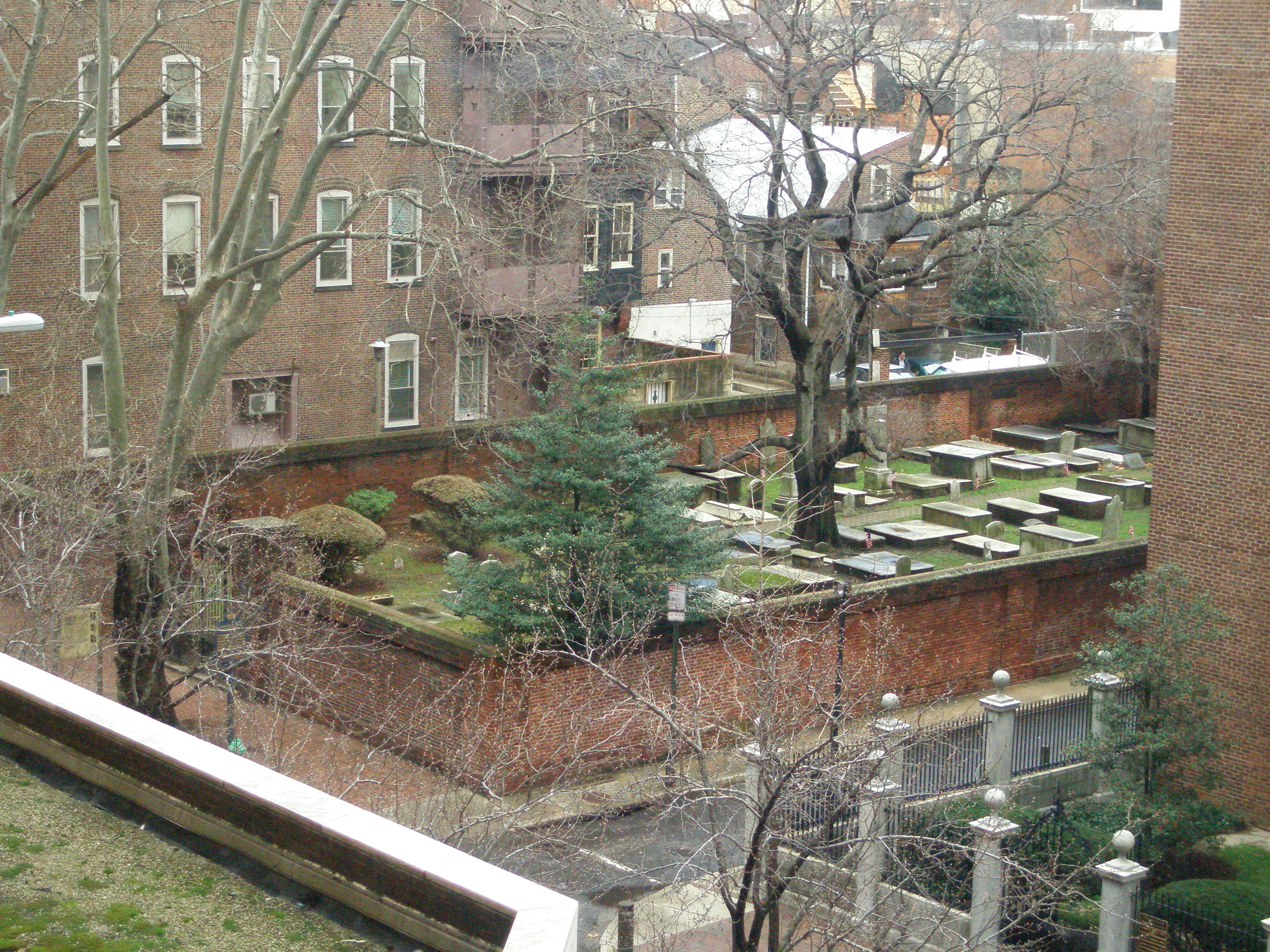
- Mikveh Israel Cemetery seen from Pennsylvania Hospital

- Location within Philadelphia Location within Pennsylvania Location within the United States
- Location: 831 Spruce Street, Philadelphia, Pennsylvania, U.S.
- Coordinates: 39.9461°N 75.1557°W
- Built: 1740
- NRHP reference No.: 71000061

Significant dates
- Added to NRHP: June 24, 1971
- Designated PHMC: n/a

Mikveh Israel Cemetery is the oldest Jewish cemetery in Philadelphia, Pennsylvania, United States, giving evidence of a settled community as early as 1740. A number of outstanding patriots, pioneers, and other notables of the Jewish faith who made important contributions to the history and freedom of America during the Colonial and Revolutionary period were interred here, and for this reason, in 1959, by an act of Congress, the burial ground was designated as a unit of the Independence National Historical Park, while continuing to be maintained by the sponsoring Congregation Mikveh Israel. The cemetery was certified by the Philadelphia Historical Commission, and in 1971, it was listed on the National Register of Historic Places.

The site is 60 by 80 feet (18 m × 24 m), less than 0.2 acres (810 m^{2}) in size, and is located in the Washington Square West neighborhood, in the center city section of Philadelphia, about 1/4 mi west and 1/4 mi south of Independence Hall.

== History ==
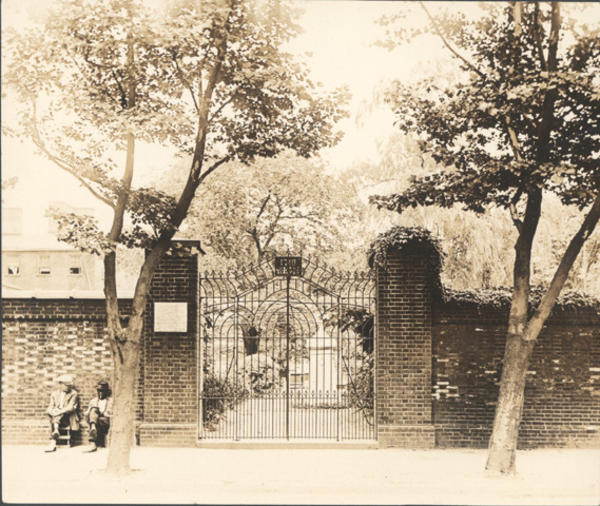
Mikveh Israel Cemetery in 1923

Mikveh Israel Cemetery was originally a private burial ground for the family of Nathan Levy. In 1738, one of Levy's children died. Rather than bury the child in unsanctified ground, he applied to John Penn (chief of Pennsylvania's proprietary government at that time) for "a small piece of ground" with permission to make it a family cemetery. This property was at the corner of 9th and Walnut Streets, the present site of the Walnut Street Theatre. Two years later, Nathan Levy secured a larger plot from the Penn family at the present location of Mikveh Israel Cemetery. This was meant to be a permanent burial ground for the entire Jewish community of Philadelphia. Levy was buried there upon his death in 1753.

The cemetery in 1740 was a 30' x 30' plot. In 1752, Nathan Levy received an additional grant of land north of the first plot. In 1765, John Penn granted Mathias Bush an adjacent piece of ground for burial purposes. By that time, the burial place was managed by the Sephardic synagogue Congregation Mikveh Israel (official name: קהל קדוש מקוה ישראל, Kahal Kadosh Mikveh Israel, or "Holy Congregation Hope of Israel"), founded in 1740 and still active in the 21st century.

In 1791, the Congregation appointed trustees for the burial ground, and in 1793, the Levy family recognized the right of the Congregation Mikveh Israel to the Spruce Street Cemetery. However the dissensions among the descendants of the buried still disputed the right of ownership, until April 14, 1828, when the Legislature passed an act giving the burial ground to the Jews of Philadelphia, with the names of the trustees affixed to the petition.

After the purchase of the Federal Street Cemetery, the burials on Spruce Street had almost ceased, the last recorded one being Hetty Pesoa, July 3, 1886. Mikveh Israel would acquire the Beth El Emeth Cemetery in 1895.

Congress voted and approved in 1956 the cemetery's addition to the National Park system.

The cemetery was plagued by vandalism and damage in the early 1960s leading the Jewish War Veterans to offer to post custodians at the site. The Colonial Philadelphia Historical Society initiated a significant restoration and preservation of the cemetery under the supervision of the National Park Service in 1976.

In the present day, Congregation Mikveh Israel continues to steward these three cemeteries.

== Burials ==
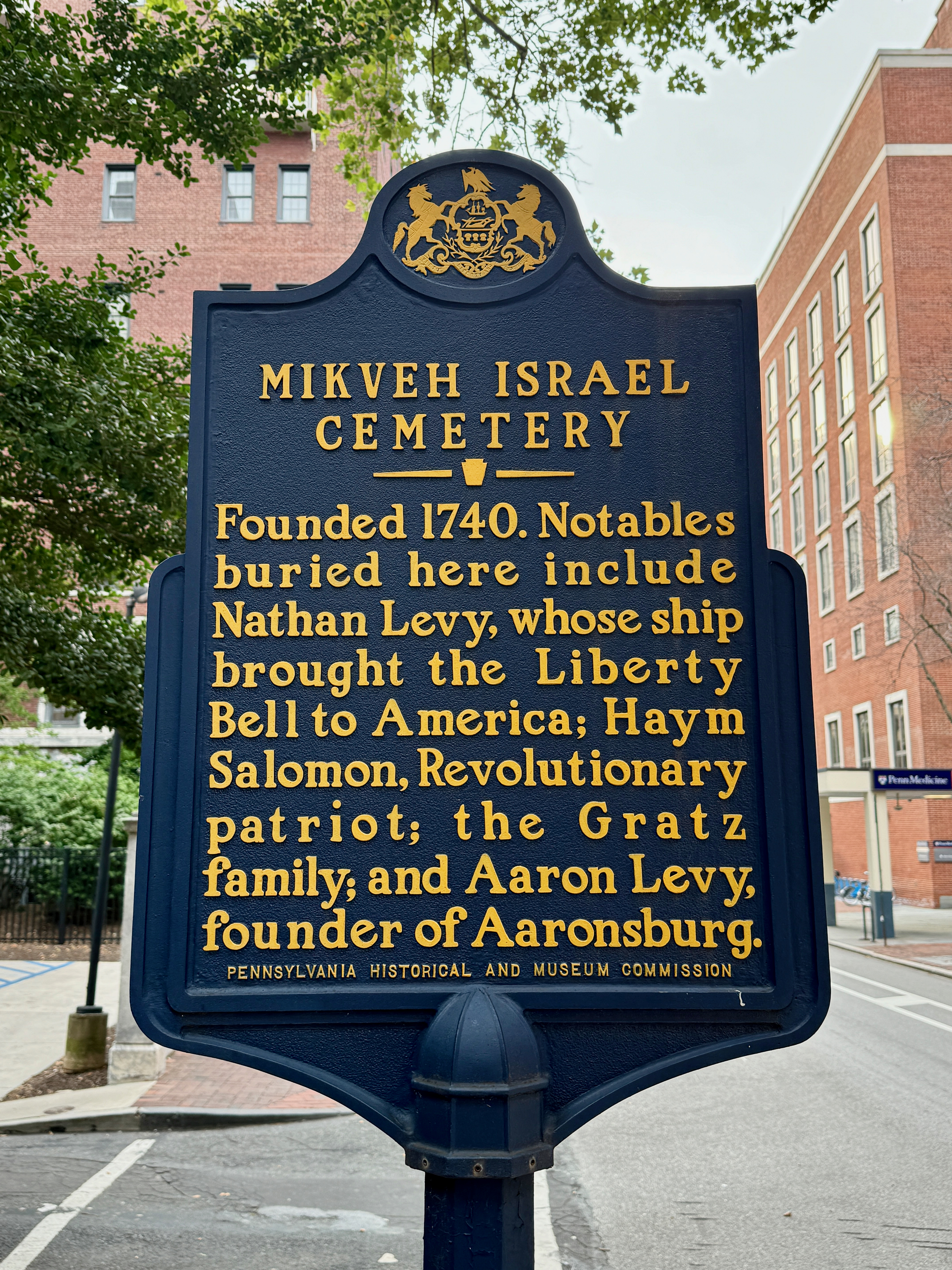
Mikveh Israel Cemetery sign

Many distinguished Americans are buried in Mikveh Israel Cemetery. They include:

- Nathan Levy (1704–1753), a merchant, he was the founder of the Jewish community of Philadelphia and established first Mikveh Israel Cemetery. Born in New York City, he moved to Philadelphia at a young age where he would engage in business with David Franks, under the firm name of Levy & Franks, this being the first Jewish business-house in Philadelphia. Levy's ship, Myrtilla, was long reputed to have transported the Liberty Bell from England to Philadelphia in 1752 (though the Hibernia, captained by William Child, is more likely to have transported the bell).
- Lucy Marks (1823), Lucy Marks was a slave owned by the Marks Family. Lucy took her owners surname which was common practice during slavery during this era. Lucy observed the traditions of Judaism and was a member of Congregation Mikveh Israel in the 1790s. Upon her death in 1823, the family applied for the customary burial in the synagogues cemetery. After a short delay and intense support from other members, Lucy was buried in an unmarked grave
- Haym Solomon (1740–1785), Polish-born patriot and financier of the American Revolution, arrived in New York in 1772, joined the Sons of Liberty, one of George Washington's personal friends, captured and sentenced to death by the British in 1776, used his knowledge of German (he spoke eight languages) to convince his Hessian jailer to escape with him to Philadelphia, where he arrived penniless.
- Michael Gratz (1740–1811), signed the Maryland's Resolution of Non-Importation of 1765 to protest the Stamp Act, and, with his brother Barnard Gratz, encouraged the opening of the West to settlement.
- Jacob Gratz (1790–1856), son of Michael Gratz, served in the Pennsylvania House of Representatives and State Senate, veteran of the War of 1812.
- Rebecca Gratz (1781–1869), daughter of Michael Gratz, noted for her philanthropy, regarded as the model for the character Rebecca in Walter Scott's Ivanhoe, and the first Jewish female college student in the United States (at Franklin College, later part of Franklin and Marshall College in Lancaster, Pennsylvania).
- Aaron Levy, founder of Aaronsburg, Centre County, Pennsylvania in 1786. Named for him, Aaronsburg is the first town in Pennsylvania (and probably in the entire United States) that was planned by and named after a Jew. He was also a known benefactor of Christian churches there. A pioneer and fur trader, he was a close friend and financial supporter of Haym Salomon.
- Benjamin Nones (1757–1826), born in France, he served on the staffs of both General Washington and General Lafayette. While still a private under Count Pulaski, he received a letter of commendation in 1779 written by Captain Verdier, a splendid testimonial to his courage. He fought in almost every action in the Carolinas. Nones became a Major of the Hebrew Legion of 400 men attached to Johann de Kalb’s command. Several years after the war, he was appointed an interpreter of Spanish and French for the United States government.
- John Moss (1771–1847) Philadelphia merchant, shipping magnate, and civic leader.
- Phillip Moses Russell, with the Continental Army at Valley Forge and surgeon's mate to General Washington.
- At least 21 Jewish soldiers of the Revolutionary War, and others from the War of 1812 and the Civil War, are interred in the burial grounds, including: Coshmon Pollock, the patriot from Georgia who fought in the siege of Savannah during the Revolution; Jacob I. Cohen, who fought in Pulaski's South Carolina campaign; Joseph Phillips, Benjamin Phillips, Abraham Mitchell, and Elias Pollock, veterans of the War of 1812.

The cemetery ceased to be a regular place of burial in 1886 except for the interment of Josephine Etting in 1913, Fanny Polano Elmaleh, wife of Reverend Leon H. Elmaleh, in 1966, and Reverend Leon H. Elmaleh in 1972.

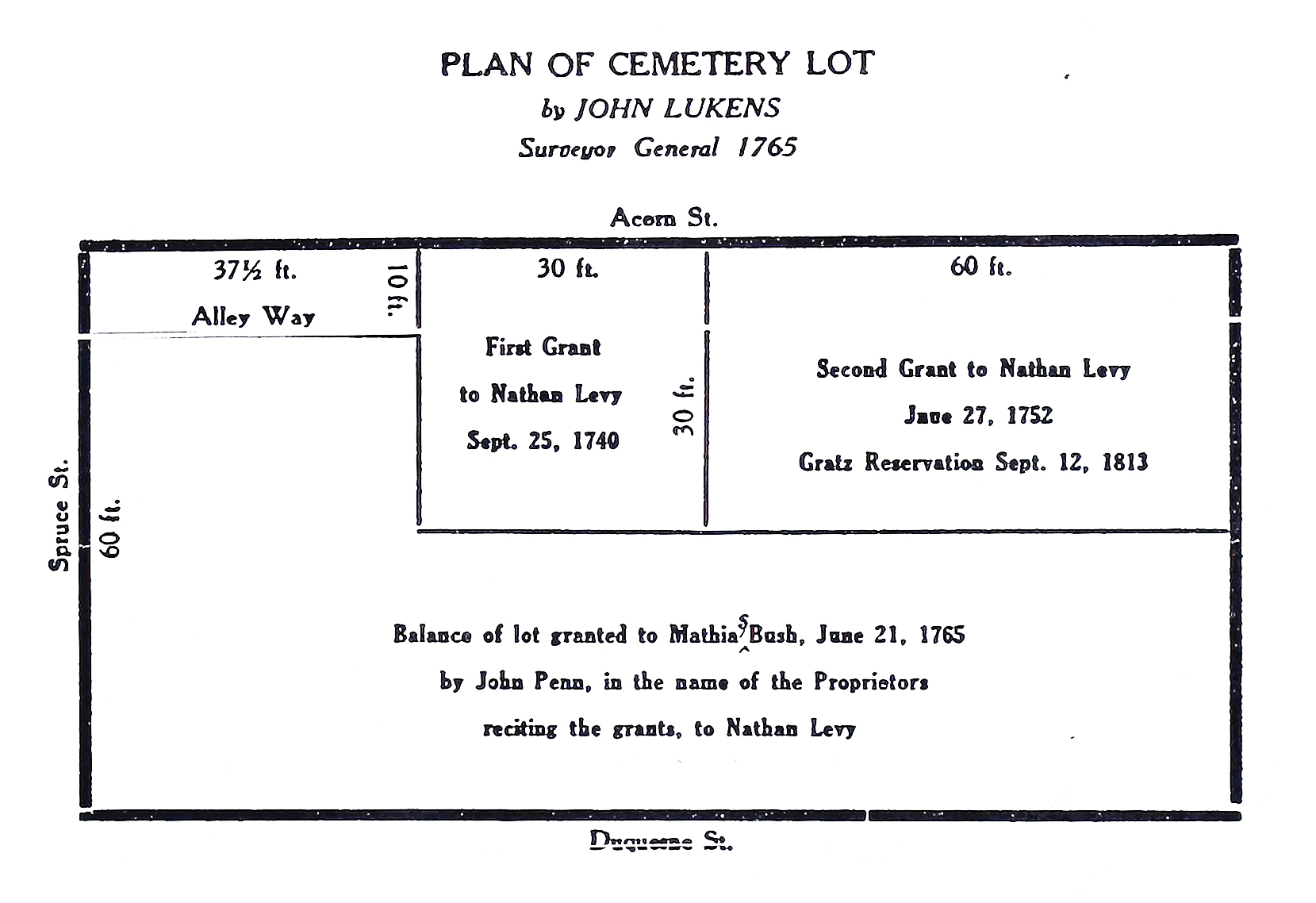
1765 Lot Plan

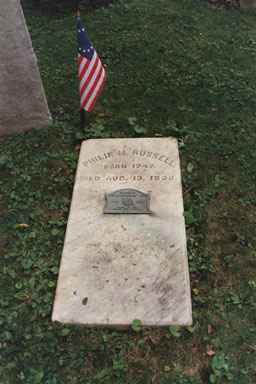
Philip Moses Russell

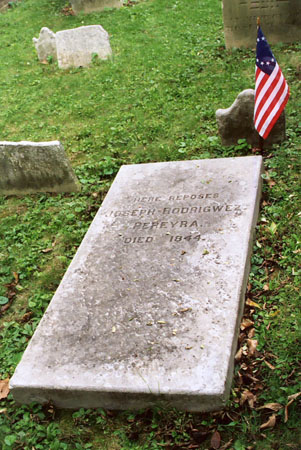
Joseph Rodriguez Pereyra

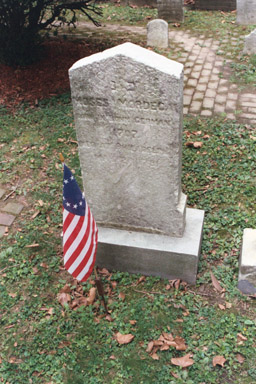
Moses Mordecai

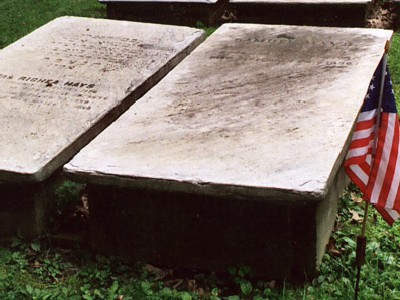
Samuel Hays

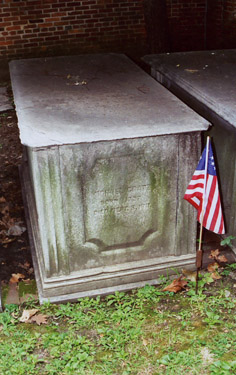
Michael Gratz

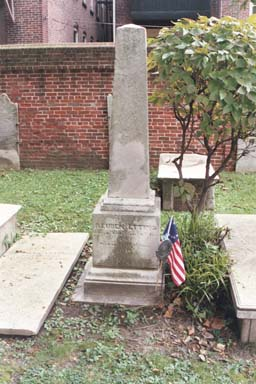
Reuben Etting
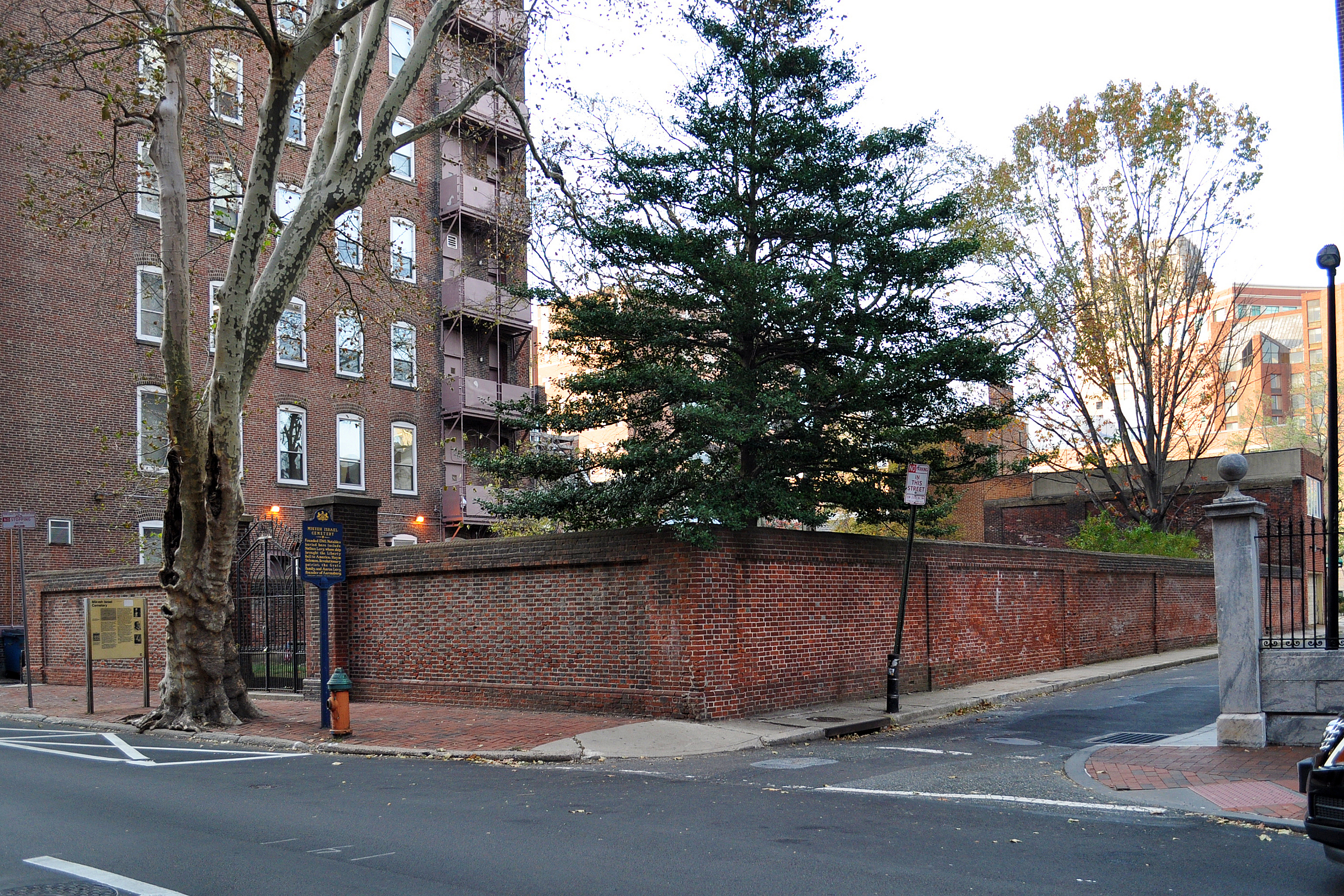

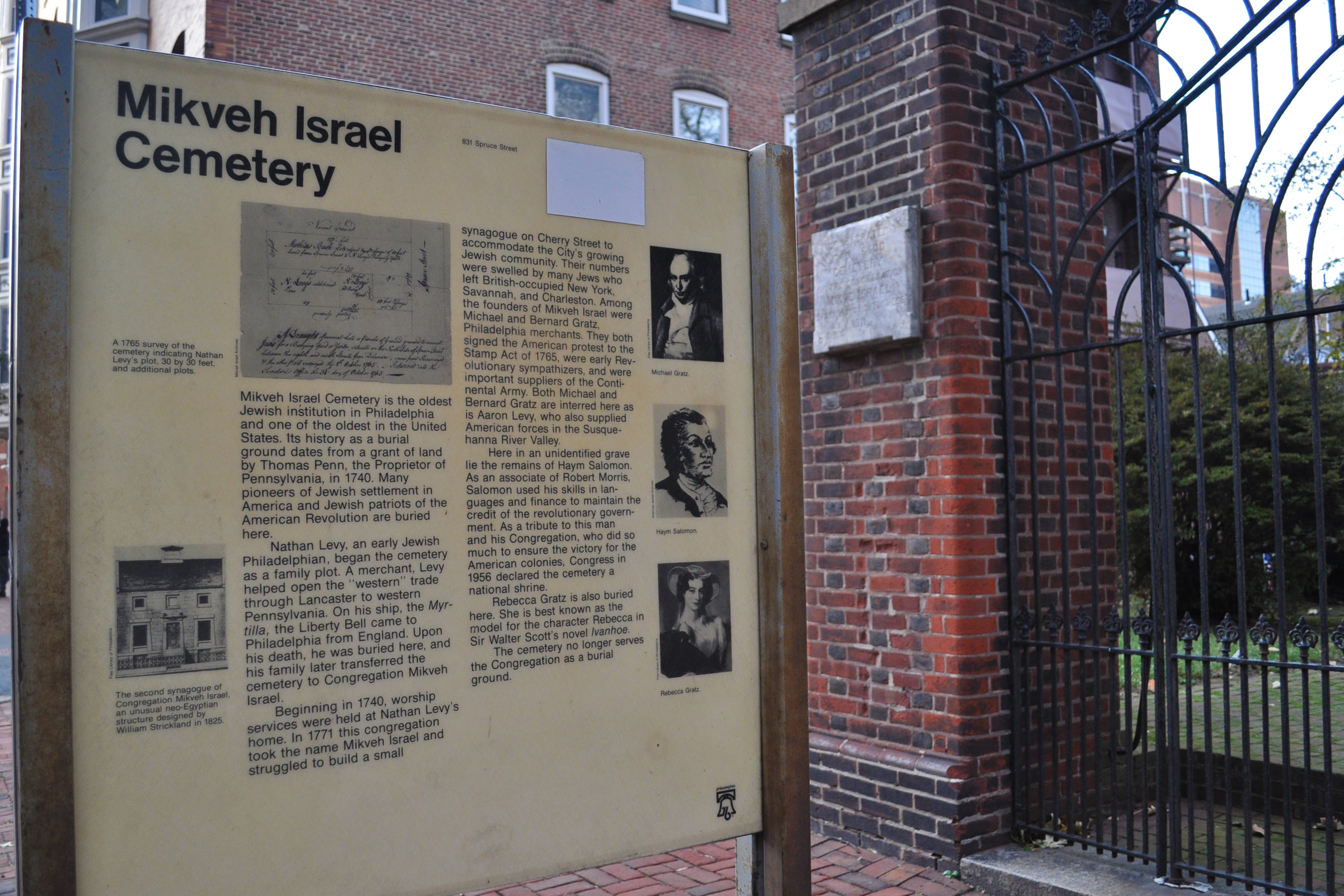

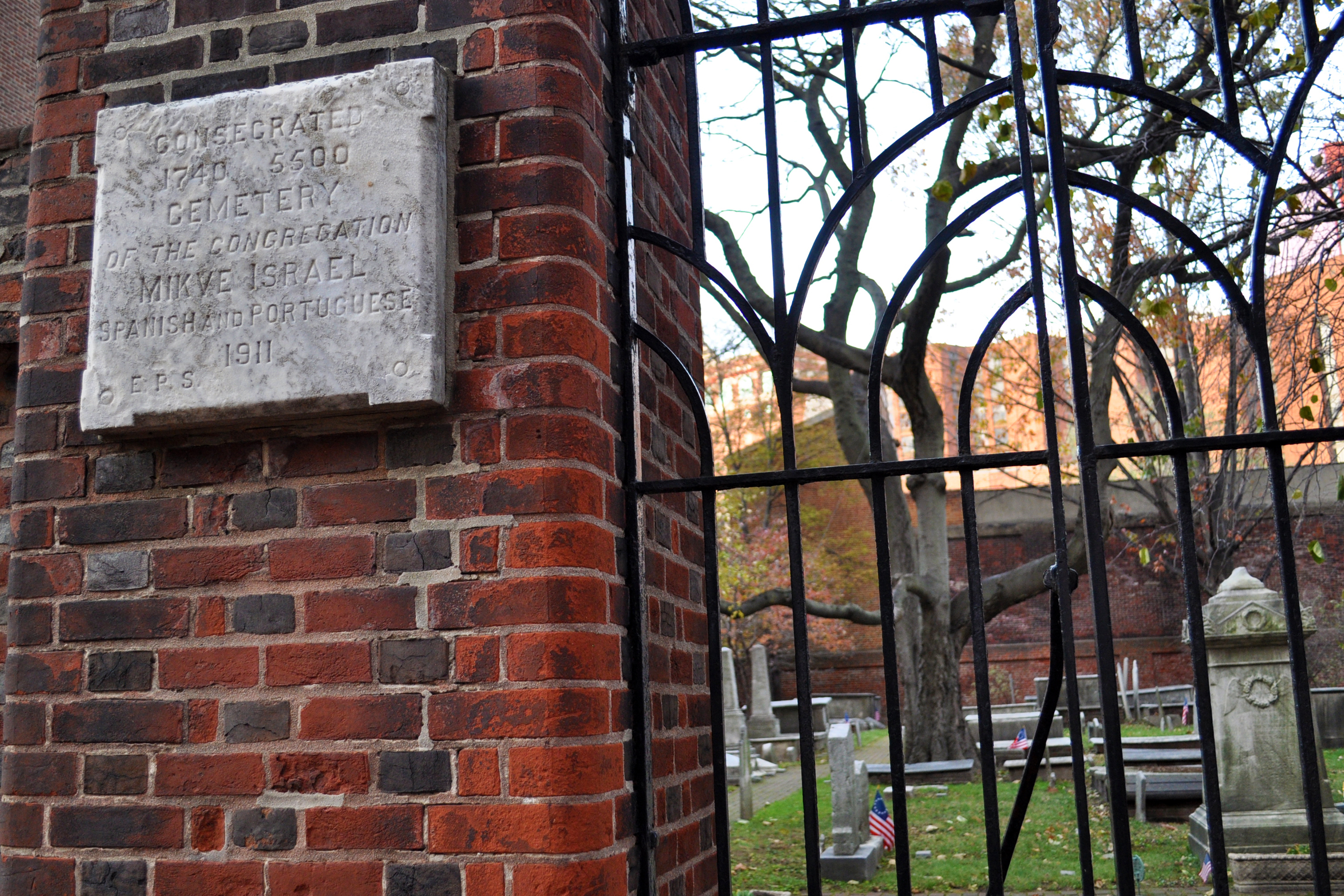

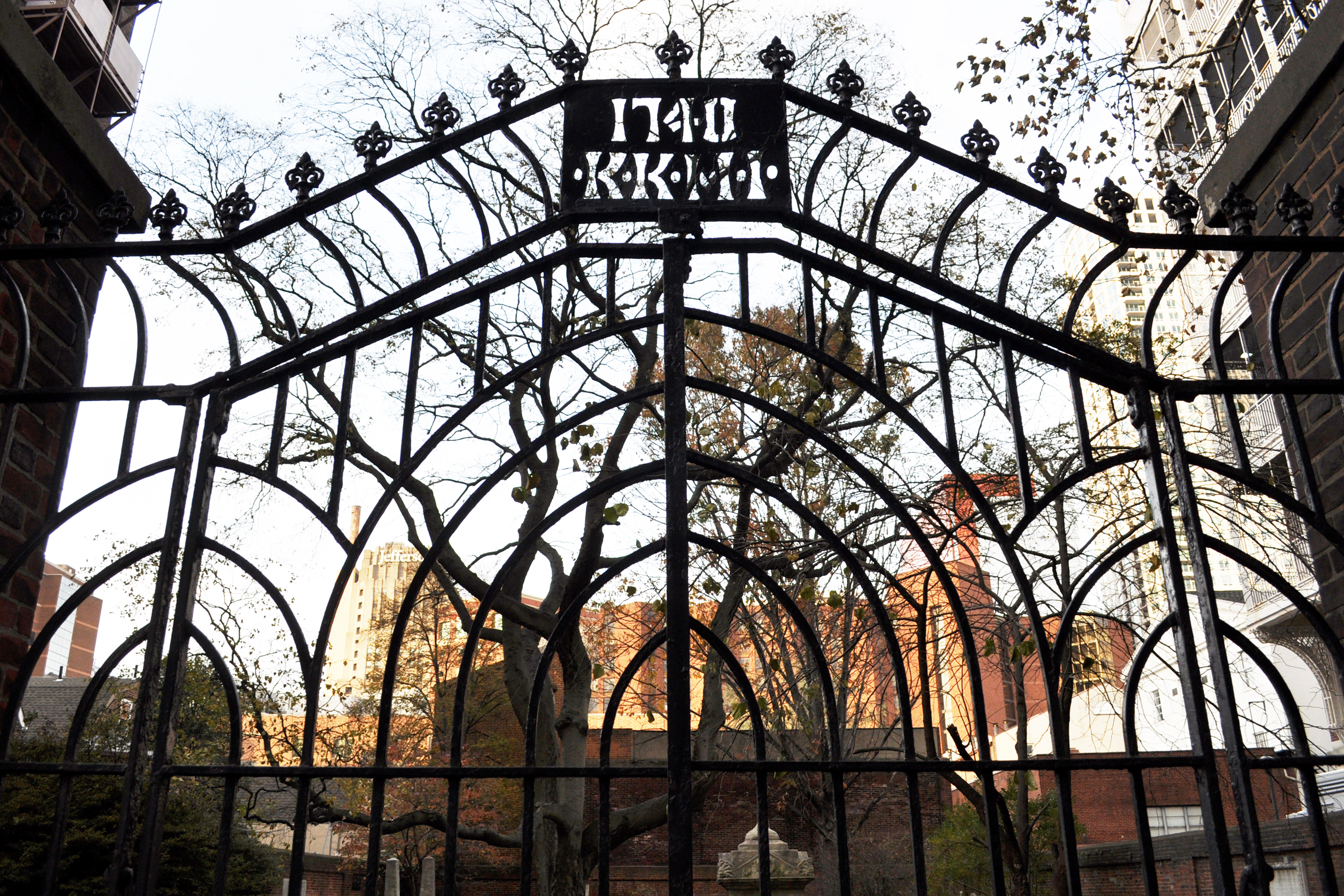

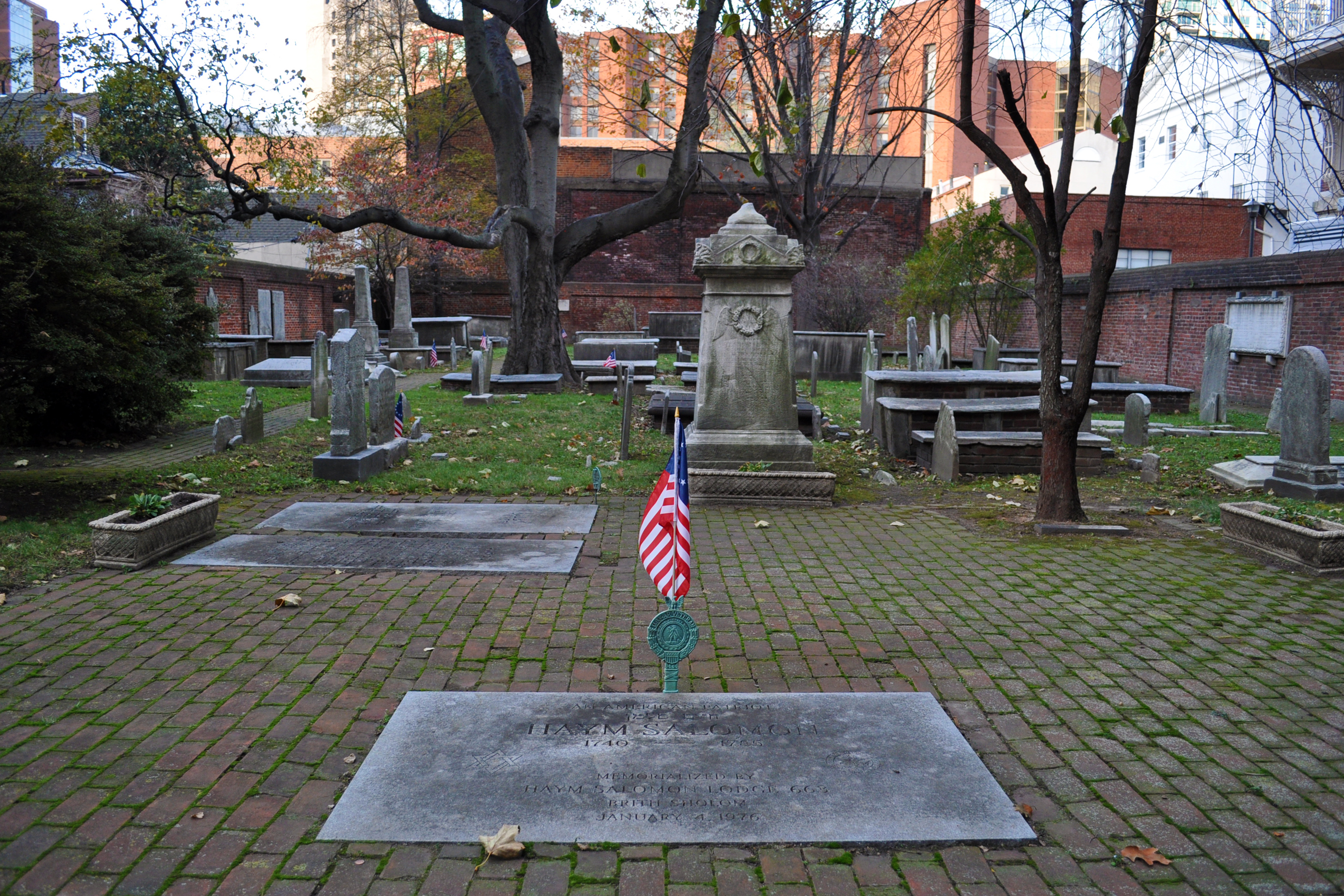

== See also ==
- Sons of the American Revolution
- Jewish history in Philadelphia
- Mikveh Israel Cemetery (Federal Street Burial Ground), 11th and Federal Streets, Philadelphia
- Mikveh Israel Cemetery (Beth El Emeth), 55th and Market Streets, Philadelphia
- Wikipedia:Jewish Encyclopedia topics
