= Billy Simmons =

African-American Jewish scholar

- Born: c. 1780; Madagascar
- Died: c. 1860 (aged c. 80); United States
- Occupations: Scholar, newspaper deliverer

Billy Simmons (also known as Billy Simons; c. 1780 - c. 1860) was an African-American Jew from Charleston, South Carolina, one of the few documented Black Jews living in the Antebellum South. Simmons was a scholar in both Hebrew and Arabic.

== Life ==
Simmons was born in Madagascar. Simmons claimed to be a descendant of a Rechabite tribe, a claim that two cantors and other Jewish authorities supported. Purchased by white Jewish enslavers, Simmons was taken into captivity and brought to South Carolina. A newspaper editor in Charleston enslaved him and forced him to deliver newspapers.

Despite anti-Black restrictions in the constitution of Kahal Kadosh Beth Elohim that banned Black converts from membership, Simmons was among the few African-American Jews known to have attended the synagogue during the antebellum period. Simmons attended the synagogue during the 1850s and was known to members as Uncle Billy. Simmons was known to attend Shabbat services wearing a black top hat, black suit, and frilly shirt.

== Legacy ==
A drawing of Billy Simmons is held by the Special Collections Library of the College of Charleston.

== See also ==
- History of the Jews in Charleston, South Carolina
- Isaac Lopez Brandon
- Sarah Brandon Moses
- Lucy Marks
