= Penina Moïse =

American poet

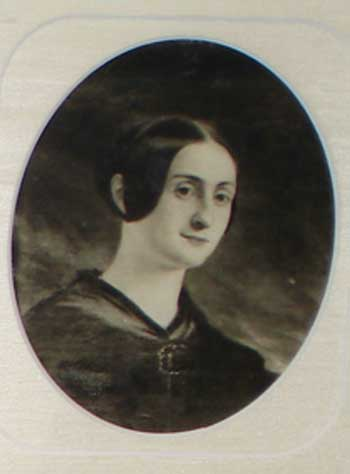
Penina Moise

Penina (Nina) Moïse (23 April 1797, in Charleston, South Carolina – 13 September 1880, in Charleston, South Carolina) was an American poet who made important contributions to the canon of hymns in Jewish services in America.

== Family ==
Penina Moïse was one of nine children born to French parents of Jewish origin, Abraham and Sarah Moise, who came to Charleston from the island of St. Eustatius in 1791 after fleeing a Black slave insurrection.

Her father was born in 1762 in Alsace, France; he immigrated to the West Indies and lived at Cape Francois, Santo Domingo. When a Black slave insurrection broke out in 1791, Abraham and his family fled to South Carolina. He became a successful merchant with a small shopkeeper and later an auctioneer.

Her mother was born Sarah Lindo in 1774. The Lindo family was known for their cultural contributions and active participation in the Jewish community. Her original Jewish community was on the Caribbean island of Sint Eustatius in the Netherlands Antilles. Her siblings were: Cherie, Aaron, Hyman, Benjamin (born in the islands), Rachel, Jacob, Abraham and Isaac (born in the United States).

== Career ==
Moïse left school at 12 when her father died. One of her brothers, Isaac, had severe asthma, and her mother was regularly sick with varying illnesses, and Penina became the family nurse, spending her days caring for her family. She studied on the side, developing her literacy and scholarship, and began her prolific writing career in 1830.

She was the author of hymns used in Jewish religious services, contributed verses to the Home Journal, the Washington Union, and other publications, and published Fancy's Sketch-Book (Charleston, 1833), a book of poems, and Hymns Written for the Use of Hebrew Congregations (1856), a compilation for her synagogue, Beth Elohim. She became a superintendent of the Congregation Beth Elohim Sunday School in 1845. After the American Civil War, she founded her own Sunday school which she operated out of her home with her sister and niece.

== Later life ==
Moïse faced significant health challenges in the 1850s, particularly the deterioration of her eyesight that was most likely due to cataracts, causing her to spend the last twenty years blind. Despite this impairment, she remained dedicated to her literary and community activities. She cared for her widowed sister Rachel Levy and Rachel's daughter Jacqueline after the war. At the same time, she continued to write, often with the assistance of others who transcribed her works. Some contributions made were to the Reform Jewish Congregation at Kahal Kadosh Beth Elohim in Charleston, South Carolina. She was pivotal in writing the congregational hymn book "Hymns Written for the Use of Hebrew Congregations," one of the first Jewish hymnals in the United States, composing numerous hymns and poems. Moïse, Rachel, and her niece established a small private girls' school in their home in Charleston to support herself and her family. Despite her blindness, she taught by memory.

She died in Charleston, South Carolina on September 13, 1880, at the age of 83.

== Publications ==
1. Lines XVI
2. Lines for the Fourth of July
3. Lines XIX
4. Lines of a Broken Tea Cup
5. Lines IX
6. Lines XIV
7. Lines XX

=== Books ===
1. Fancy Sketch Book (1833)
2. Hymns Written for the Use of Hebrew Congregation (1856)
3. Secular and Religious Works of Penina Moïse with a Brief Sketch of Her Life (1911, published posthumously)

=== Hymns ===
1. Great Arbiter of Human Fate
2. My God, My Father, and My Guide!
3. Lift, Lift the Voice of Praise on High
4. God of the Sabbath! to Thy praise
5. God of my fathers! in Thy sight

Penina Moïse wrote 190 hymns for her congregation, the Beth Elohim. The 1932 Reform Movement Union Hymnal included over 10 of her hymns. In 1842, Beth Elohim published a hymnal, and 60 of its 74 songs in the hymnal were Penina Moïse hymns.

== Legacy ==
Moïse's hymns dealt with many contemporary debates around religion, politics, and their intersection. Her poems have been primarily discussed in the context of women's literature of the nineteenth century and, more specifically, Jewish women writers.

The Jewish Women's Archive honors Moïse's life and works, highlighting her role as a pioneering Jewish poet and hymnist. The archive provides extensive biographical information and discusses her impact on Jewish American history. The Southern Jewish Historical Society, which recognizes Moïse for contributions to Jewish culture in the American South. She is celebrated as one of the significant figures in Southern Jewish history, and her works and legacy are discussed in various publications and lectures. The South Carolina Historical Society commemorates Moïse as an influential figure in the State's history. Their records acknowledge her achievements in literature and her contributions to Jewish religious life.

In 1999, Penina Moïse was posthumously inducted into the South Carolina Academy of Authors.
