= Lucy Marks =

African-American Jew from Philadelphia

- Died: 1838; Philadelphia, Pennsylvania, U.S.

Lucy Marks (fl. 1778 – died 1838) was an African-American Jew from Philadelphia, one of the few documented black Jews during early American history. She may have been a member of Congregation Mikveh Israel, and she is buried in Mikveh Israel Cemetery.

== Life ==
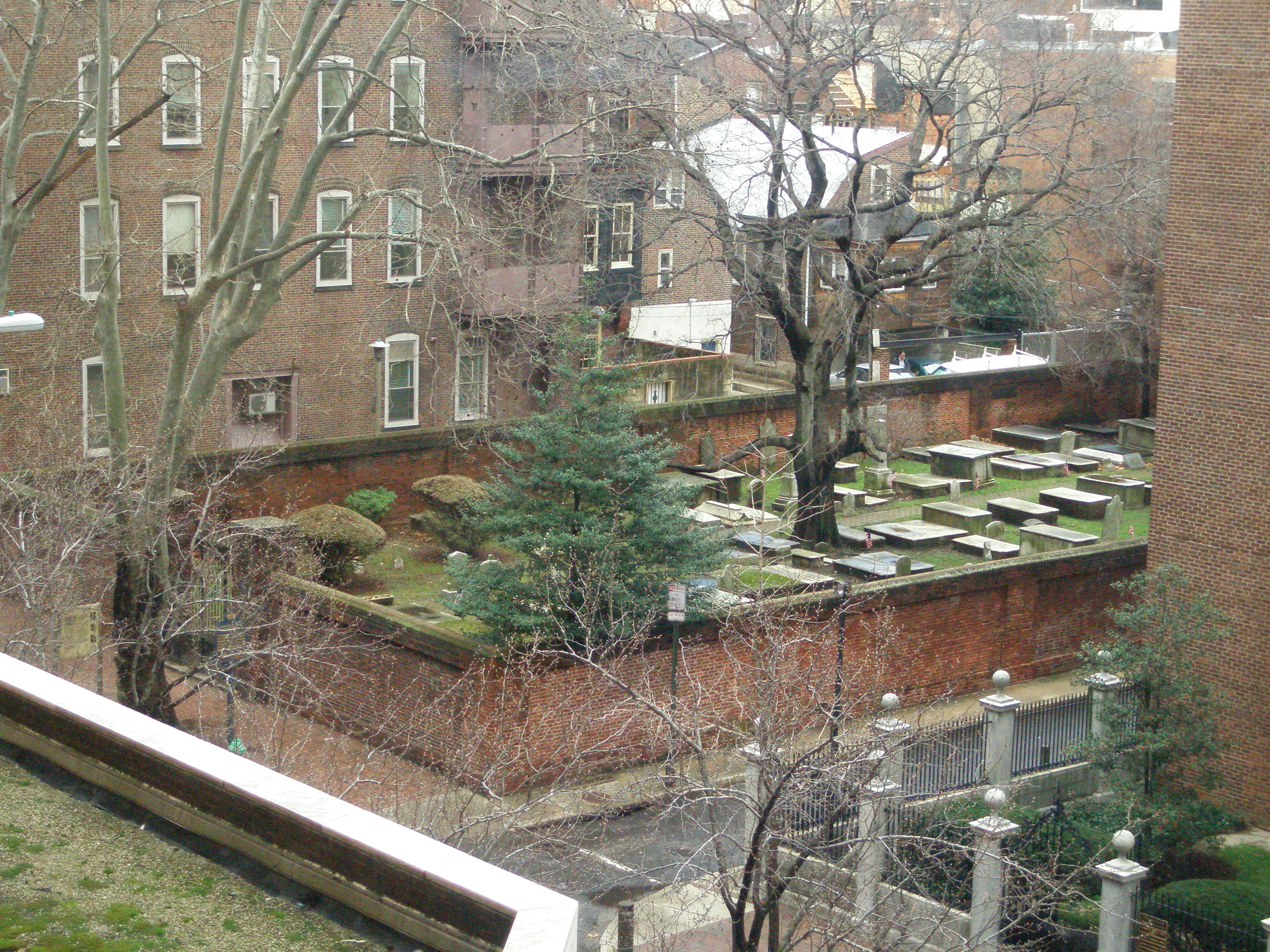
The Mikveh Israel Cemetery in Philadelphia

Lucy was enslaved by and lived with the Marks family, an Ashkenazi Jewish family in Philadelphia, whose surname she adopted. She worked for the family as a cook. During the 1790s, Marks practiced Judaism and attended Congregation Mikveh Israel in Philadelphia.

It is unknown whether Rachel Marks enslaved Marks or she descended from Black Caribbean Jews, but it is believed that she was not born Jewish. Unlike many white synagogues in the Caribbean and elsewhere, Congregation Mikveh Israel did not have anti-Black constitutional provisions and was more accepting of Jews of color and converts of color.

Lucy observed the traditions of Judaism and was a member of Congregation Mikveh Israel in the 1790s. She was a "devout observer of the precepts of Judaism" and sat in the women's section of Mikveh Israel during services. Marks lived until old age. Upon her death in 1838, the family applied for the customary burial in the Mikveh Israel Cemetery. While Black people who were enslaved and or worked for Jews were often encouraged to follow the practice of Judaism, they were also repeatedly denied burial in Jewish cemeteries. A number of synagogue members objected to the burial, "horrified" that a Black woman would be buried in the cemetery alongside members of the city's Jewish aristocracy. After a short delay and intense support from other members, Marks was buried in an unmarked grave next to the grave of Haym Salomon. Marks still rests in the cemetery today.

An April 6, 1778 letter written to Marks by an elderly slave is preserved at the Manuscripts Division of the Special Collections Department of the University of Virginia Library in Charlottesville.

== See also ==
- Billy Simmons
- Isaac Lopez Brandon
- Sarah Brandon Moses
- History of the Jews in Philadelphia
