= Benjamin Nones =

American soldier

Benjamin Abraham Nones
- Born: March 9, 1757; Bordeaux, France
- Died: May 2, 1826 (aged 69); Philadelphia, Pennsylvania, US
- Occupations: Soldier, merchant
- Spouse: Miriam Marks

Benjamin Abraham Nones was an American patriot, soldier, merchant, slave owner, and abolitionist. He was a respected merchant in Philadelphia and a prominent member of the city's Jewish community. He served as a major in the Continental Army.

== Life ==
Nones, a Sephardic Jew, was born in Bordeaux, France in 1757. He was the son of Rachel and Abraham Nones. Nones was a respected merchant in Philadelphia. Influential in the city's Jewish community, he was a member of Congregation Mikveh Israel. Nones served as the parnas of Mikveh Israel for 13 years and was an officer for the Society of Ezrath Orchim, Philadelphia's first Jewish charity. Nones was appointed a major in the Continental Army during the American Revolutionary War. He served on the staffs of George Washington and of the Marquis de Lafayette. He also fought in the siege of Savannah in 1779. He was captured by the British at the siege of Charleston in 1780, and remained a prisoner of war until the Franco-American victory at the siege of Yorktown in October 1781.

In the summer of 1800, an antisemitic attack against Nones was printed in the Gazette of the United States. Nones responded in writing that "I am a Jew, and if for no other reason, for that reason I am a republican...In republics we have rights, in monarchies we live but to experience wrongs." Nones is buried at Mikveh Israel Cemetery in Philadelphia. The actress Jill Clayburgh is the great-great-great-granddaughter of Nones and the actress Lily Rabe is his great-great-great-great-granddaughter.

== See also ==
- History of the Jews in Colonial America
