= Francis Salvador =

American politician

- Born: 1747; London, England
- Died: 1 August 1776 (aged 29) Keowee River, South Carolina
- Allegiance: United States
- Service years: 1776
- Children: 3 daughters and 1 son

Francis Salvador (1747 – 1 August 1776) was an English-born American planter in the Province of South Carolina. Born into a Sephardic Jewish family in London, in 1774 he was the first professing Jew to be elected to public office in the American colonies when chosen for the Provincial Congress. He had joined the Patriot cause and in 1776 was the first Jew killed in the American Revolutionary War, fighting with the militia on the South Carolina frontier against Loyalists and their Cherokee allies.

== Early life ==
Coat of Arms of Francis Salvador

Francis Salvador was born to Jacob Salvador and his wife in London, where a Spanish and Portuguese Jewish (Sephardic) community had developed since the 17th century. His uncle, Joseph Salvador, was a prominent businessman, investing in the British East India Company. His grandfather Francis Salvador was the boy's namesake. Francis' father died when he was two, and his younger brother Moses was born soon after.

The boys were tutored privately and raised in wealth. When the sons came of age, they each inherited £60,000. Salvador became active with his uncle Joseph and the wealthy DaCosta family of London in plans to settle poor Jews and their family members in the New World.

Francis Salvador married Sarah Salvador, his first cousin and Joseph's second daughter. Her father gave her a £13,000 dowry. They had a son, John Lovel Salvador, and three daughters before the senior Salvador emigrated in late 1773 to South Carolina.

== Emigration to North America ==
In 1733, the London Sephardic community sent 42 Jews to Savannah with the first English settlers in present-day Georgia. In the 1730s, Sephardic Jews from London began emigrating to Charleston as a preferred destination. They were later joined by Jews from Germany, the Netherlands and the West Indies. When Spain attacked Georgia in 1740, most of the Jewish families fled north to Charleston, fearing the Spanish Inquisition might be imposed in Georgia.

The Salvador and DaCosta families in London bought 200,000 acres (810 km^{2}) in the new district of Ninety-Six (known as "Jews Land") in the western frontier of the Carolina colony. They began to settle it. The Salvador family was financially ruined by the Lisbon earthquake of 1755, as they still held properties there, and subsequent failure of the East India Company, in which they had interests. They retained their land in South Carolina and little other wealth.

== Representative to the Provincial Congress ==
Francis Salvador acquired 7,000 acres (28 km^{2}) in Ninety Six District, Carolina Colony, and emigrated intending to send for his wife, Sarah, and their four children as soon as he was able. Arriving in Charleston in December 1773, Salvador quickly joined the American cause. He became close friends with the rising leaders of the Revolution in the South, including Charles Cotesworth Pinckney, John Rutledge, William Henry Drayton, Henry Laurens, and Samuel Hammond.

Buying African slaves to work his land, Salvador settled at Coroneka (commonly called Cornacre) in 1774, joined for a while by his friend Richard A. Rapley, as neither wanted to live alone. They were both elected as delegates to South Carolina's Provincial Congress; Salvador was the first Jew elected to public office in the Thirteen Colonies in North America. He was re-elected to the second Provincial Congress in 1775, holding the post until his death. At the time, Jews legally could neither hold office nor vote, but no colonists objected when Salvador and his friend Richard A. Rapley were elected as two among the several frontier representatives from Ninety-Six District to the Provincial Congress. They were joined by Andrew Williamson, then a major in the militia.

When the Provincial Congress first met in Charleston in January 1775, Salvador was chosen for important committee assignments: drawing up the declaration of the purpose of the congress to the people; obtaining ammunition; assessing the safety of the frontier, and working on the new state constitution. The group also framed a bill of rights and composed an address to South Carolina's royal governor, setting forth the colonists' complaints against the Crown. Salvador was appointed to a commission that tried to convince the Tories in the northern and western parts of the colony to join the American cause.

The second Provincial Congress assembled in November 1775. Salvador was one of the champions for independence; he urged his fellow delegates to instruct the colony's delegation to the Continental Congress to cast their vote for independence. Salvador chaired the Ways and Means Committee of this second Provincial Congress, at the same time serving on a select committee authorised to issue bills of credit as payment to members of the militia. He was also selected for a commission to preserve the peace in the interior parts of South Carolina.

== Fighting in the American Revolution ==
Early in 1776, the British had induced their Indian allies to attack the South Carolina frontier to create a diversion in favour of British operations on the sea-coast. On 1 July 1776, Indians began attacking frontier families in Ninety Six District. Salvador rode from his lands to the White Hall plantation of Major Andrew Williamson, 28 miles (45 km) away, to raise the alarm. Salvador took part in the engagements that followed. On 31 July, Williamson captured two Loyalists. They led his 330-men militia into an ambush by their fellow Loyalists and Cherokee allies at the Keowee River. Alexander Cameron, deputy to Captain John Stuart, led the Loyalist forces. Salvador was shot and fell into the bushes, but was discovered and scalped by Cherokee warriors that night. He died from his wounds at age 29.

Concerning his death, Colonel William Thomson wrote to William Henry Drayton, in a letter dated "Camp, two miles below Keowee[a Cherokee town], 4 August 1776, as follows:

Here, Mr. Salvador received three wounds; and, fell by my side. . . . I desired [Lieutenant Farar], to take care of Mr. Salvador; but, before he could find him in the dark, the enemy unfortunately got his scalp: which, was the only one taken. . . . He died, about half after two o'clock in the morning: forty-five minutes after he received the wounds, sensible to the last. When I came up to him, after dislodging the enemy, and speaking to him, he asked, whether I had beat the enemy? I told him yes. He said he was glad of it, and shook me by the hand – and bade me farewell – and said, he would die in a few minutes.

A Patriot journal, The Rememerance, wrote of Salvador: "he was universally loved and esteemed."

Salvador became caught up in the Revolution before he could bring his family to the colony. His wife and children stayed in London, aided by his estate and their families.

== Legacy and honours ==
- His son John Lovel Salvador converted to the Anglican Church and became a minister.
- In 1950, to celebrate the 200th anniversary of Charleston's Jewish congregation, the City of Charleston erected a memorial to Francis Salvador, the first Jew to die for the American Revolution.

Born an aristocrat, he became a democrat;

An Englishman, he cast his lot with the Americans;

True to his ancient faith, he gave his life;

For new hopes of human liberty and understanding.

- Ninety Six National Historic Site has been designated a National Historic Landmark to commemorate actions there and the history of the settlement; in addition to earlier Patriot engagements, Loyalists resisted an American siege in 1781.

== See also ==
- History of the Jews in Charleston, South Carolina

== Sources ==
- Drayton, John. (1821/2009) Memoirs of the American Revolution, Charleston: A.E. Miller, 1821, online at Open Library Internet Archive
- Gerber, Jane S. (1992). The Jews of Spain : A History of the Sephardic Experience. New York: Free Press. ISBN 0-02-911573-6.
- Gibbes, Robert Wilson (1853–1857). Documentary History of the American Revolution. New York: D. Appleton & Co.
- Huhner, Leon. (1901) "Francis Salvador, A Prominent Patriot of the Revolutionary War," Publications of the American Jewish Historical Society (1893–1961), ISSN 0146-5511, 1901, Volume 9, p. 107
- Levitan, Tina (1952). The Firsts of American Jewish History 1492–1951. Brooklyn: The Charuth Press.
- Lyons, Renee Critcher (2014). "Foreign-Born American Patriots-Sixteen Volunteer Leaders In The Revolutionary War." North Carolina-McFarland Publishing.
- Pencak, William (2005). Jews and Gentiles in Early America 1654–1800. Ann Arbor: University of Michigan Press. ISBN 978-0-472-11454-2.
- Rosengarten, Dale and Ted. (2003) A Portion of the People: Three Hundred Years of Southern Jewish Life Columbia: University of South Carolina Press, catalogue for exhibit noted below.
