= Harby baronets =

Extinct baronetcy in the Baronetage of England

- Escutcheon of the Harby baronets of Aldenham
- Creation date: 1660
- Status: extinct
- Extinction date: 1674

The Harby Baronetcy, of Aldenham in the County of Hertford, was a title in the Baronetage of England. It was created on 17 July 1660 for Job Harby. The title became extinct on the death of the second Baronet in 1674.

== Harby baronets, of Aldenham (1660) ==
- Sir Job Harby, 1st Baronet (c. 1590–1663)
- Sir Erasmus Harby, 2nd Baronet (1628–1674)
