= Lee Cohen Harby =

American writer (1849–1918)

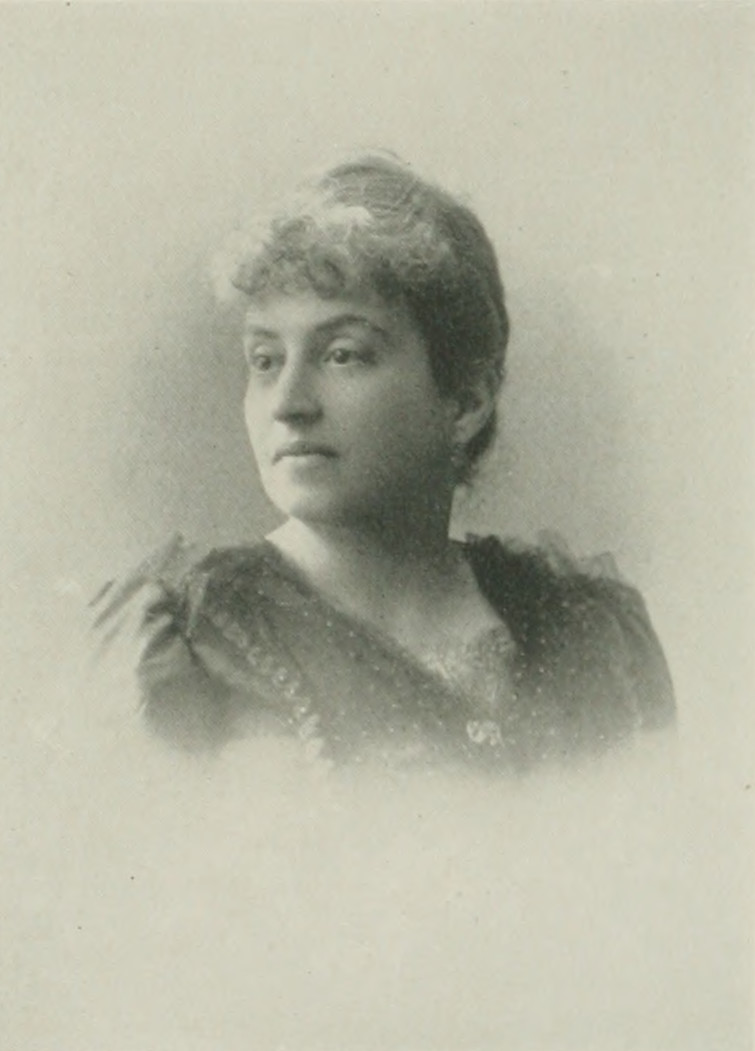
Lee Cohen Harby

Lee Cohen Harby (September 7, 1849 – October 21, 1918), also seen as Leah Cohen Harby, was an American writer on Southern and Jewish topics.

== Early life ==
Leah (or Lee) Cohen was born in Charleston, South Carolina, the daughter of Marx E. Cohen and Armida Harby Cohen. Her grandfather was Isaac Harby (1788–1828), a writer and leader in Southern Jewish society. Her sister Caroline Cohen Joachimsen was also a writer.

== Career ==
Harby moved to Texas as a new bride. She wrote for local newspapers there, including an 1873 essay, "Christmas Before the War". Her 1883 essay, "On Women and Their Possibilities", encouraged Jewish women in particular to become educated and independent. She wrote often on Texas history subjects, in essays and stories for national periodicals, including "The Old Stone Fort at Nacogdoches" (1888), "The City of a Prince" (1888), "Texas Types and Contrasts" (1890), "The Earliest Texas" (1892), "Judy Robinson – Milliner" (1893), "The Tejas: Their Habits, Government, and Superstitions" (1894). By recent scholars' estimation, she was "one of the most widely-published women writers in nineteenth-century Texas."

Harby also wrote poetry. She wrote lyrics for "Flag Song of Texas" for a contest in 1903, and won a cash prize when it became the official state flag song. She was a member of the United Daughters of the Confederacy and the Daughters of the American Revolution. She wrote poems to be read at United Confederate Veterans reunions, and was honored by that organization for her contributions. "I love everything Confederate until it is painful," she declared in a 1906 publication. She donated items to the Museum of the Confederacy in Richmond, Virginia.

== Personal life ==
Lee Cohen married her first cousin once removed Jacob "Jack" de la Motta Harby in 1869. They had two children, Marx Edwin Harby and Lily Lee Harby, and lived in New York from 1890 to 1900. She was widowed in 1916 and she died in 1918, aged 69 years, in Charleston. A few of her papers are archived at the University of Texas at Austin, Briscoe Center for American History; others are at the College of Charleston.

There is a historical marker about Lee Cohen Harby in Charleston, placed by the Daughters of the American Revolution of South Carolina in 1924, for her "patriotic and untiring efforts".
