= Nidhe Israel Synagogue =

Former Conservative synagogue in Bridgetown, Barbados

- Hebrew: בית הכנסת נדחי ישראל
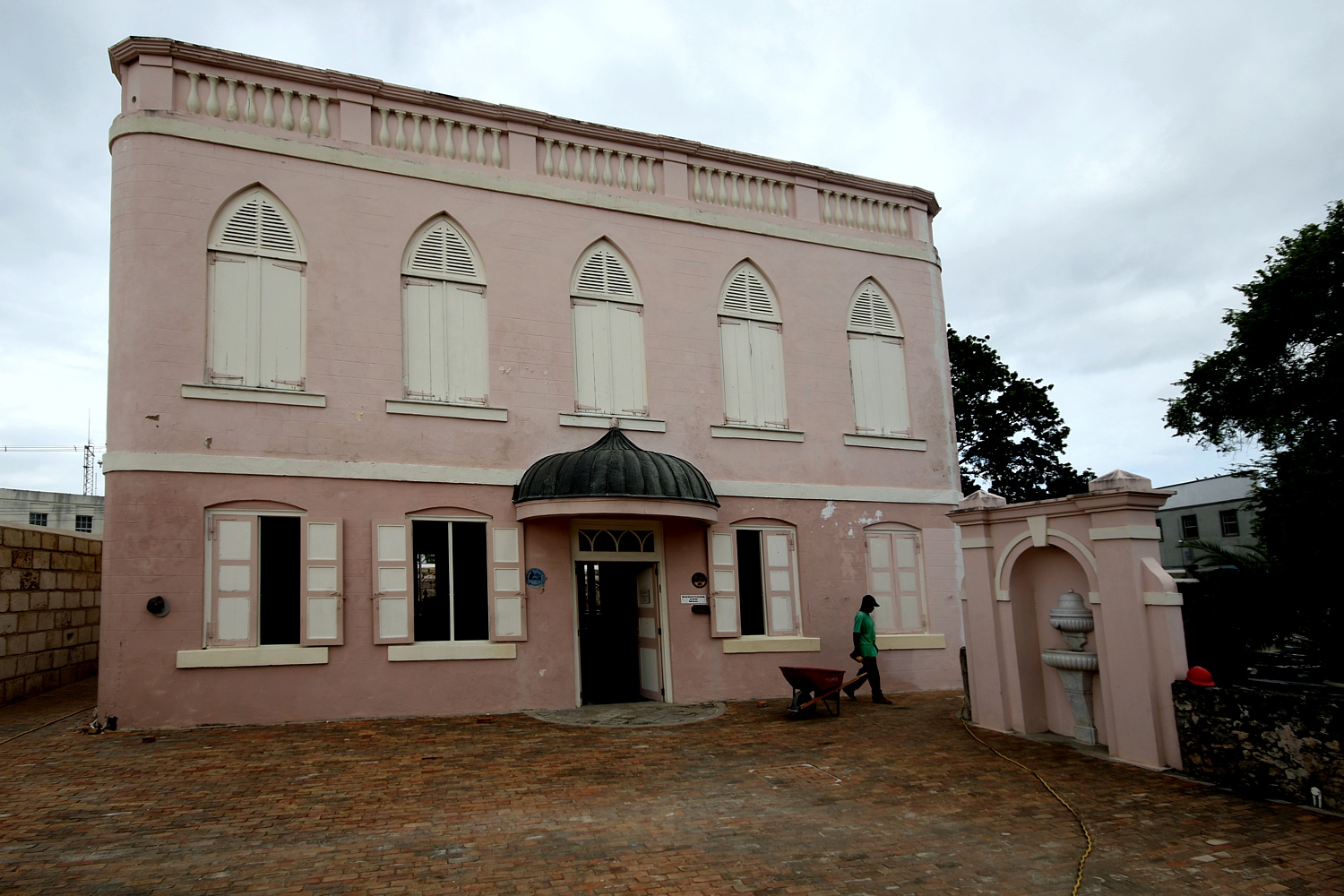
- Exterior of the former synagogue, in 2016

- Location of the former synagogue in Barbados

Religion
- Affiliation: Conservative Judaism (former)
- Rite: Sephardi
- Ecclesiastical or organisational status: Synagogue (1654–1929)
- Status: Active

Location
- Location: Synagogue Lane, Bridgetown, St. Michael
- Country: Barbados
- Coordinates: 13°05′58″N 59°36′55″W

Architecture
- Completed: 1654

UNESCO World Heritage Site
- Part of: Historic Bridgetown and its Garrison

The Nidḥe Israel Synagogue (Hebrew: בית הכנסת נדחי ישראל, romanized: Bet Knesset Nidḥe Yisrael, lit. 'Synagogue of the Scattered of Israel') is a Conservative Jewish congregation and synagogue, located on Synagogue Lane in Bridgetown, Barbados. It is the only synagogue in Barbados, and is bordered by the wider Magazine Lane, James, Coleridge and Pinfold streets, it is a part of the Synagogue Historic District.

In 2011 the synagogue and excavated mikveh were designated as UNESCO protected properties within the World Heritage Site of Historic Bridgetown and its Garrison area. It is one of the oldest synagogues in the Western hemisphere and a Barbados National Trust property.

== History ==
Built in 1654, it was destroyed by a hurricane in 1831, was rebuilt, but then fell into disrepair until it was sold in 1929.

Haim Isaac Carigal was in Barbados, perhaps acting as rabbi of the congregation, at the time of his death in 1777.

About 300 Jews from Recife, Brazil, persecuted by the Portuguese, settled in Barbados in the 1660s. Skilled in the sugar industry, they quickly introduced the sugarcane crop and passed on their skills in cultivation and production to the Barbados land owners.

=== Present day ===
From the time that the synagogue was deconsecrated in 1929, it underwent numerous changes. The women's gallery that looked down on the ark and bimah was converted into a full second floor. Arches around the windows and the original floor were replaced. The building changed ownership many times as well and the Jewish cemetery outside became a dumping site.

In 1983, the building was seized by the Barbados Government, which intended to raze the building and erect a courthouse. Two years later, it turned the building over to the Barbados National Trust, in thanks to petitioning by the local Jewish community. In 1986, the renovation process began led by Sir Paul Altman. The building was returned to use as a synagogue when the renovation was complete, though it is still owned by the National Trust.

In 2008, an American archaeologist, Michael Stoner, was excavating the former rabbi's house on the premises. As he was digging, two Israeli tourists happened by and uttered the word mikveh. After excavating for three weeks, Stoner had indeed discovered a mikveh, probably dating to the 17th century.

The Nidhe Israel Museum was also opened in 2008.

== Gallery ==
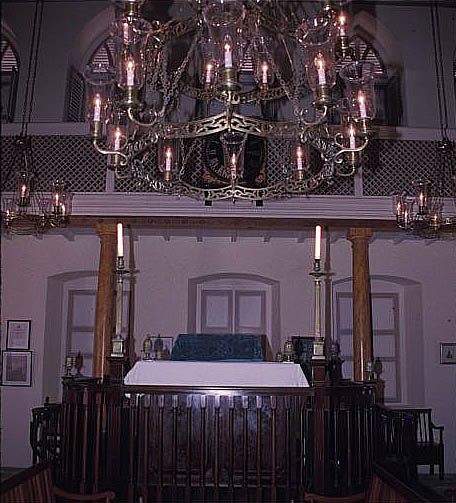
The synagogue's bimah

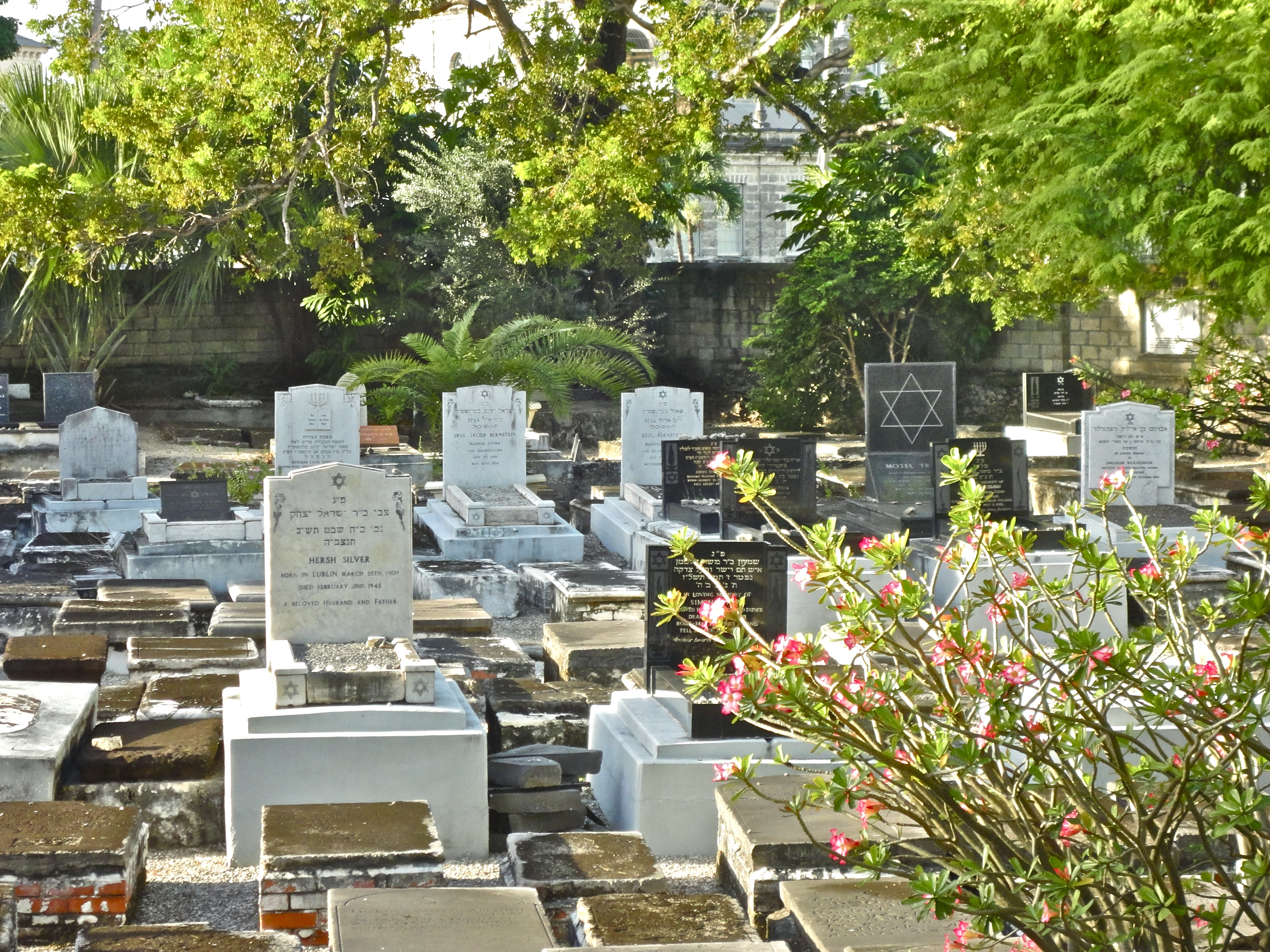
Bridgetown Synagogue Cemetery

== See also ==
- Dutch Brazil
- History of the Jews in Barbados
- History of the Jews in Latin America
- List of historic buildings in Bridgetown and Saint Ann's Garrison
