= Isaac Harby =

American journalist (1788–1828)

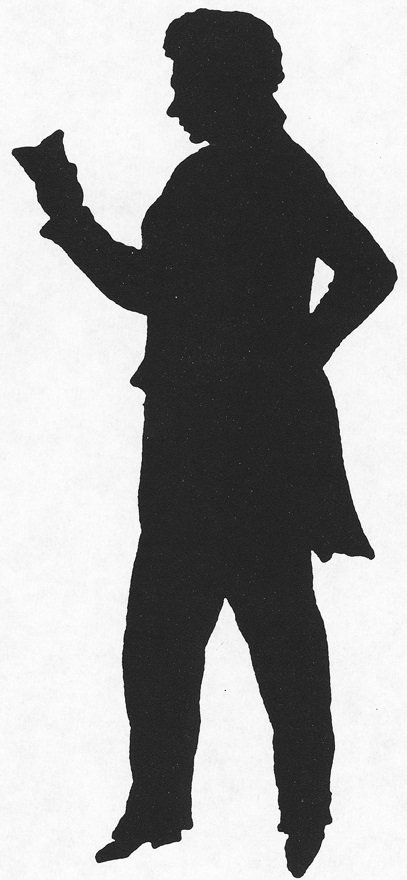
- silhouette of Isaac Harby by an unknown artist, 1810
- Born: November 9, 1788; Charleston
- Died: December 14, 1828 (aged 40)
- Occupation: Writer

Isaac Harby (1788–1828), from Charleston, South Carolina, was an early 19th-century teacher, playwright, literary critic, journalist, newspaper editor, and advocate of reforms in Judaism. His ideas were some of the precedents behind the development of Reform Judaism.

Harby's writings were anti-Northern, anti-abolitionist, and staunchly supportive of slavery.

Harby came from a Sephardic Jewish family. He and some associates created a new synagogue in 1824 because they felt the existing Sephardic ritual was too hard to understand. The words were spoken in a language that few Jews at the time understood, and all associated with their pain in the Sephardi diaspora. The words were spoken too quickly to understand even if the language was known. Beth Elohim in Charleston, South Carolina.

"We wish to worship God, not as slaves of bigotry and priestcraft but as the enlightened descendants of Abraham, Isaac, and Jacob."

His granddaughter Lee Cohen Harby (1849–1918), a writer, was also born in Charleston.
