= History of the Jews in Barbados =

The history of the Jews in Barbados goes back to the 1600s. A Jewish population has been in Barbados almost continually since 1654.

== Origins ==
The Jewish arrival in Barbados is a direct consequence of the Spanish Inquisition, specifically the Alhambra Decree. In 1492, some Sephardic Jews had fled the persecution in the Iberian Peninsula for Brazil where they remained until the 17th century.

In 1628, 300 Dutch Sephardi Jews settled on the island, the first account of Jewish people settling in Barbados.

Jews in Brazil were forced to flee once again from what was formerly Dutch Brazil (specifically Recife, where there existed a large Jewish community) after it was captured in 1654 by the Inquisitorial persecuting Portuguese colonizers who were consolidating their hold over all of Brazil. They fled back to Amsterdam, then to London to seek official clearance to settle in Barbados, which they were granted in 1654.

The early Barbadian population was increased from two other sources. In 1664, the Jewish settlement at Cayenne was dissolved and a few moved to Barbados. In 1674, a number of people also moved from Suriname following its surrender to the Dutch, the majority of these being deported to Jamaica, but a few managed to stay in Barbados. Two communities were established over time, the first being centered around the Nidhe Israel Synagogue in the Capital, Bridgetown, and a smaller one in northerly Speightstown. In Bridgetown, out of a total of 404 householders, 54 were Jews.

The name Barbados, meaning 'the bearded ones' officially comes from the island's bearded fig tree, but local historians doubt this version as there are very few of those trees on the island (he counted 50) and rather emit the hypothesis (while admitting having no physical evidence) that 'the bearded ones' were actually the Sephardi Jews who first inhabited the island.

== Economic success and the resulting discrimination ==
Unlike the case in Suriname, very few of the Barbadian Sephardim were plantation owners. Given the small size of Barbados, all the arable land was already occupied by the 1660s. Many Jewish settlers engaged in sugar and coffee cultivation. While the British government considered Jews to be good businessmen and tradesmen, the British merchants accused them of committing illegal business transactions. Jews were accused of trading more frequently with the Dutch than the British merchants. In 1661, three Jewish traders in Barbados requested to establish trade routes between Barbados and the Dutch Colony of Suriname; through this enterprise, the Jews gained much wealth, but further irritated the British merchants.

By 1679, nearly 300 Jews lived in Barbados.

On October 23, 1668, the Jews of Barbados were banned from all forms of trade. Jews were forbidden from employing Christians, limited from purchasing more than one male slave, and were forced into living in a Jewish ghetto in Bridgetown. They could not owe more than three acres of land and three slaves.

During the 18th century, the Jewish community of Barbados continued to grow and become financially successful, although the Jewish congregation in Speighstown closed. The 1750 census recorded 800 Jews out of the 18,000 White inhabitants of the island.

All the discriminatory laws were removed by 1802, by the colonial government of Barbados and in 1820 the British Parliament also repealed the discrimination laws.

=== Contribution to the sugar industry ===
The Jewish refugees brought their expertise in the production and cultivation of sugarcane and coffee, expertise which contributed to the development of Barbados as a major producer of sugar. They brought new technological methods in the sugar industry, and helped the island become economically established.

Among the first Jewish settlers in Barbados was David Rafael de Mercado who had previously developed in Recife a way to turn windmills into sugar-crushing machines.

== Decline and revival ==
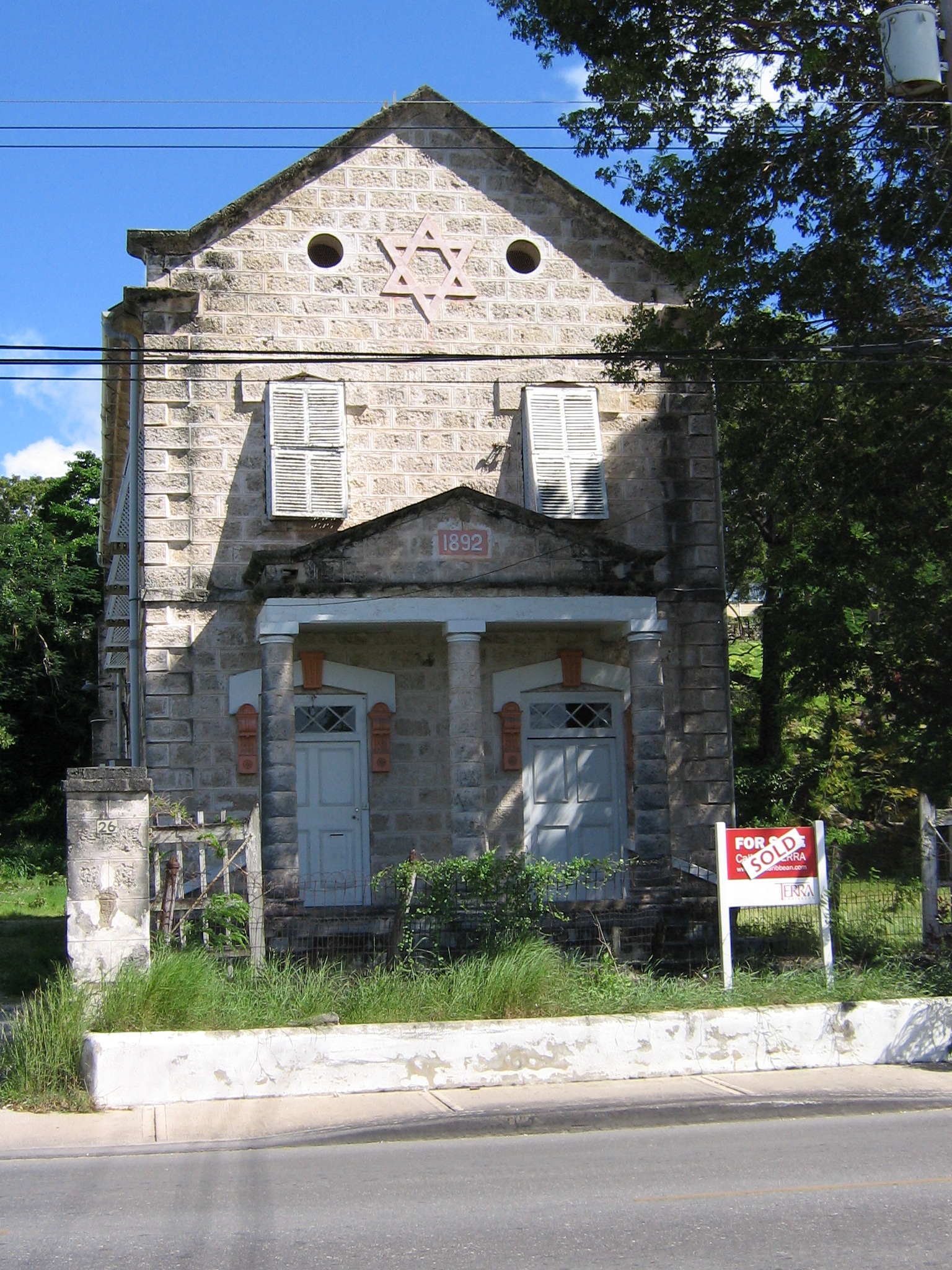
Synagogue in Belleville, Barbados

In 1831, the island was devastated by a hurricane that severely damaged the economy and by 1848 the Jewish population had seen a significant decline in numbers. The storm had killed 1,500 people, destroyed the original Nidhe Israel Synagogue, and flattened most of the island.

Emigration and assimilation eventually took their toll on the original Jewish population of the island; the Jewish population is believed to have vanished by 1929 when it is said that the last of the practicing descendants of the Brazilian Jews left the island. As a result, the community's synagogue fell into a state of disuse. A Jewish presence returned to the island in the aftermath of World War II, in the form of Ashkenazi Jewish refugees from Eastern Europe. In 1968, there were about 80 Jews out of a total population of 251,000.

Although small, the existing Jewish community has taken steps to preserve its heritage: for instance, in maintaining a functioning synagogue, the Nidhe Israel Synagogue, in the capital city Bridgetown. In January, 2008, the Nidhe Israel Museum was opened. The museum tells the story of the Barbadian Jewish community. Also in 2008, the archaeology of the yard of the seventeenth century synagogue was investigated by historians/archaeologists and students from the University of the West Indies. Though the focus is on the long destroyed rabbi's house, excavations have revealed the intact 17th-century mikveh, which was constructed over a still-running freshwater spring.

== See also ==
- Dutch Brazilian
