= Kahal Kadosh Beth Elohim =

One of the oldest Jewish congregations in the US

- Hebrew: קהל קדוש בית אלוהים
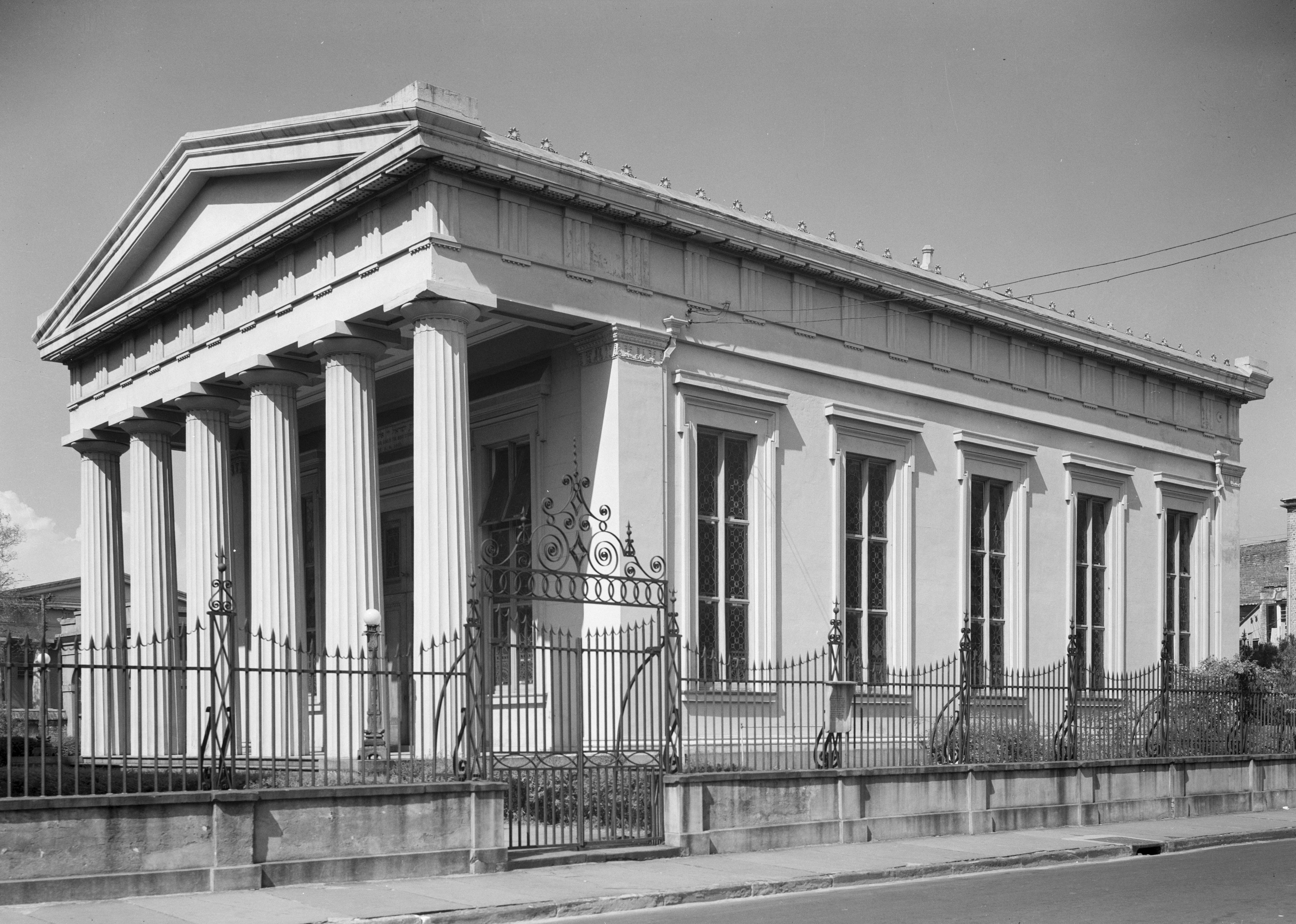
- Kahal Kadosh Beth Elohim synagogue, 1938

- Location in South Carolina

Religion
- Affiliation: Reform Judaism
- Ecclesiastical or organisational status: Synagogue
- Leadership: Rabbi Stephanie Alexander; Rabbi Dr. Greg Kanter; Rabbi Dr. Anthony David Holz (Emeritus)
- Status: Active

Location
- Location: 90 Hasell Street, Charleston, South Carolina
- Country: United States
- Coordinates: 32°46′56″N 79°55′58″W

Architecture
- Architect: Cyrus L. Warner
- Type: Synagogue
- Style: Greek Revival
- General contractor: David Lopez Jr
- Established: 1749 (as a congregation)
- Completed: 1794 (Georgian basilica); 1840 (NRHP site)

Specifications
- Direction of façade: South
- Materials: Brick

Website
- kkbe.org
- Kahal Kadosh Beth Elohim Synagogue
- U.S. National Register of Historic Places
- U.S. National Historic Landmark
- NRHP reference No.: 78002499

Significant dates
- Added to NRHP: April 4, 1978
- Designated NHL: June 19, 1980

Kahal Kadosh Beth Elohim (Hebrew: קהל קדוש בית אלוהים, lit. 'Holy Congregation House of God', also known as K. K. Beth Elohim, or more simply Congregation Beth Elohim) is a Reform Jewish congregation and synagogue located in Charleston, South Carolina, in the United States.

Having founded the congregation in 1749, it was later claimed to be the first Reform synagogue located in the United States. The congregation's first synagogue, in the Georgian Revival style, was built in 1793–1794 and destroyed in an 1838 fire that ravished Charleston's central business district, impacting 500 properties over approximately 150 acres (61 ha). The current architecturally significant Greek Revival synagogue located at 90 Hasell Street, completed in 1840, was designed by Cyrus L. Warner and built by enslaved African descendants owned by David Lopez Jr, a prominent slaveowner and proponent of the Confederate States of America.

The congregation is one of the oldest Jewish congregations in the United States. The congregation is nationally significant as the place where ideas resembling Reform Judaism were first evinced.

== History ==
Before 1830, Kahal Kodesh Beth Elohim (KKBE) was a place of worship in Charleston, South Carolina for Spanish and Portuguese Jews using Portuguese rituals as done in Portugal before the Spanish and Portuguese inquisitions. Commenced as an Orthodox Sephardic congregation, it later adopted a reformed religious ritual after reabsorbing a splinter group originally led by Isaac Harby. In 1824 the Reformed Society of the Israelites was founded by Portuguese Jews. It adopted ideas from the European Reform movement, and itself contributed ideas to the later, widespread American Reform movement, but was also quite different form either of them, with its own unique Reform prayer-book, the first in America.

The founding members of the KKBE were Sephardi Jews of Spanish and Portuguese origin, who arrived into Charleston from London, England to work in mercantile freight and the slave trade. While the congregation is sometimes considered to be the originator of Reform Judaism in the United States, that movement was established by European immigrants mostly from Germany later on.

Rabbi Jacob S. Raisin served as rabbi from 1915 to 1944. Rabbi Burton Padoll, who served as the synagogue's rabbi during the 1960s, was an outspoken activist for the rights of African Americans. Rabbi Padoll was forced to resign as rabbi after prominent members of the congregation objected to his support for the civil rights movement.

== Synagogue building ==
The present Greek Revival building is the second oldest synagogue building in the United States, and the oldest in continuous use, in the United States; in addition, it has the oldest continually operating Jewish cemetery in the United States. It is a single-story brick building, set on a raised granite foundation. The brick is stuccoed and painted white, and is marked in manner to resemble stone blocks. The portico comprises six fluted, equally spaced Doric columns, stucco over molded brick, approximating a Theseion order, supporting a gabled pediment.

The building was added to the National Register of Historic Places on April 4, 1978, as Kahal Kadosh Beth Elohim Synagogue and was designated a National Historic Landmark on June 19, 1980. The Coming Street Cemetery, owned by the Congregation, is listed separately on the National Register of Historic Places.

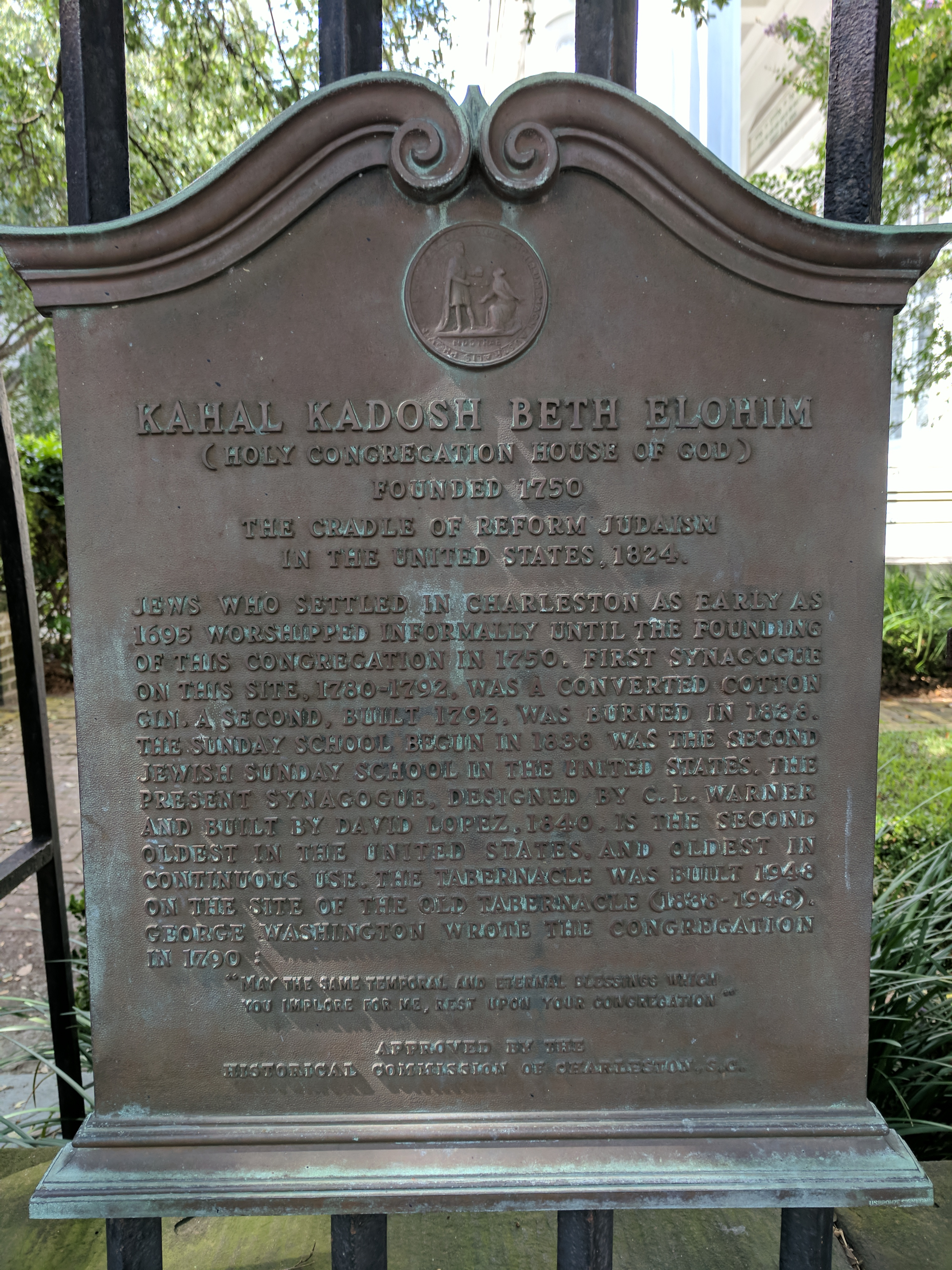
A historical plaque at the entrance to the synagogue grounds.

In 2021, a monument was installed with an inscription at the site of the synagogue, to commemorate the forced human labor extracted from Black Africans owned by industrialist and slaveowner David Lopez Jr in the construction of the site; In acknowledging the past injustice, Rabbi Stephanie Alexander says "We're being honest and transparent about what has enabled us to come together and has enabled us to come to this space."

Inside the synagogue, there is a mural which includes a Jewish Confederate soldier sitting with a broken sword, an artistic depiction of the Lost Cause of the Confederacy.

== Notable members ==
- Joseph Levy, a soldier
- Moses Lindo, a trader
- David Lopez Jr, a builder, industrialist, slave owner
- Francis Salvador, a plantation owner and the first Jew elected to U.S. public office
- Billy Simmons, an African-American Jew in the Antebellum period

== See also ==
- List of National Historic Landmarks in South Carolina
- National Register of Historic Places listings in Charleston, South Carolina
- Oldest synagogues in the United States
- Touro Synagogue
