= International Israelite Board of Rabbis =

African-American Black Hebrew Israelite Organization

The International Israelite Board of Rabbis is the oldest Black Hebrew Israelite religious board in the United States, whose founders preserved synagogues in Black neighborhoods in New York City and Chicago, and whose teachings launched the spread of nonviolent Torah observance among thousands of Black Hebrew Israelites in New York City since 1919. The board originated from the 1925 incorporation of Ethiopian Hebrew Rabbinical College in New York City. As a non-denominational institution, it has focused on guiding religious leaders and scholars under its auspices to advance Torah observance among Black Hebrew Israelites in New York City, and build bridges with both mainstream American Jewish communities and non-Messianic Black Hebrew congregations. With time, the board has grown to represent religious leaders of congregations in the United States, the Caribbean, and Africa. The board tolerates leniency in Halakha provided that religious leaders adhere to a maximalist view of the Tanakh, and require observance of Biblical commandments by members of their congregations (see: De-'oraita and de-rabbanan, meaning "Torah commandments vs. Rabbinic enactments").

== Liturgy and culture ==
Congregational worship among constituents of the International Israelite Board of Rabbis can be characterized as Conservadox, complementarian, and based on Sephardic liturgy (using the ArtScroll Siddur as their standard prayerbook). The African Israelite minhag, which is the cultural expression of their religion, uses the upper register of African-American culture as the basis for preserving the positive communal aspects of the Black church in generations past and advancing a positive connection to Africa via the Black Arts Movement, while also serving as a bulwark against assimilation into antisocial urban subcultures. The standards of modest attire (Tzniut) assume knit or capped head coverings for men, and headscarves and ankle-length West African clothing for women, with a Tallit worn by men in suit jackets during worship services. Many men who opt out of wearing a suit jacket instead wear formal West African clothing with Tzitzit affixed on each corner. Musical expression ranges from Spirituals that exclusively draw from Old Testament themes, to chanting Pizmonim and Zemirot to the beat of Afro-Caribbean music. Cuisine for Friday night Kiddush and Saturday afternoon Oneg Shabbat often consists of Soul Food and Caribbean cuisine prepared in accordance with Kashrut.

== History ==
The board in its current form was organized in 1970 by students of Chief Rabbi Wentworth Arthur Matthew. The board has its roots in the Rabbi's 1919 founding of the Commandment Keepers Ethiopian Hebrew Congregation.

Capers Funnye served as the Chief Rabbi for the organization beginning in 2015; he died in 2026.

In 2025, the board voted to allow women to be ordained as rabbis, and women rabbis joined the board. However, the board also ruled that when women rabbis are considered ritually impure (for example, during menstruation or after childbirth) others must do their religious duties.

== Chief Rabbis ==
While congregational Rabbis have local oversight of affairs (see: Mara d'atra), the International Israelite Board of Rabbis holds the Chief Rabbi responsible for advocating for its constituents' interests and recognition by other national bodies. He also presides over the ordination of the Rabbis, and serves as the Rosh Yeshiva of the Israelite Academy (founded in 1925 as the Ethiopian Hebrew Rabbinical College).

1. Chief Rabbi Arnold Josiah Ford (23 April 1877 – 16 September 1935): Prominent member of the Universal Negro Improvement Association and African Communities League who studied in Ethiopia in order to promote the way of life of Ethiopian Jews during the Great Migration (African American) as an alternative to Black Christianity for those seeking spiritual enlightenment. He is said to have gained an ordination in Ethiopia with the approval of the Beta Israel, and went on to ordain Wentworth Arthur Matthew in his "Ethiopian Hebrew" approach to the Torah. This is the origin of the appellation "Hebrew" to followers of Biblical Judaism of African descent.
2. Chief Rabbi Wentworth Arthur Matthew (1892-1973): Founder of the board and founder of the Commandment Keepers Ethiopian Hebrew Congregation, the first Black synagogue to formally incorporate in New York City (1919).
3. Chief Rabbi Levi Ben-Levy: Served from 1935-1999.
4. Chief Rabbi Capers (Shemuel) Funnye: Inaugurated in 2016 and member of the Chicago Board of Rabbis. In 2009, he led the first Passover Seder at the White House, at the invitation of his cousin, then-First Lady Michelle Obama. He died in 2026.

== Relations with normative American Judaism ==
Black Hebrew Israelites are not considered Jewish by the mainstream, normative American Jewish community, but have long sought recognition as Jews. The International Israelite Board of Rabbis is not recognized by the New York Board of Rabbis, which represents Rabbinic Judaism in New York City.

== See also ==
- African-American Jews
- Black Jews in New York City
- African American–Jewish relations
- List of African-American Jews
