= Mordecai Herman =

Black Hebrew Israelite religious leader

- Born: Mordecai Herman; West Indies
- Occupations: Rabbi, Black Hebrew Israelite leader
- Spouse: Mary Billingsley Herman

Mordecai Herman was a pioneering Black Hebrew Israelite religious leader in New York City who founded the Moorish Zionist temple at 127 West 134th Street in Harlem.

== Life ==
A West Indies immigrant to New York City, Herman claimed direct Ethiopian lineage. Like other Black Hebrew Israelite religious leaders, Herman believed that Afro-Caribbean people had admixture with Iberian Sephardi Jews. Herman spoke Hebrew, as well as some Yiddish. Herman founded the Moorish Zionist temple in Harlem in 1921.

One of the earliest Black Hebrew Israelite congregations in New York City, the Congregation of the Moorish Zionist Temple of the Moorish Jews in Harlem blended the belief that Black people were the descendants of the Biblical Israelites with aspects of traditional Judaism, elements from Christianity, and aspects of pan-African nationalism. Herman was a supporter of the Garveyist movement and was a member of Marcus Garvey's Universal Negro Improvement Association (UNIA). Herman was a Zionist who supported a shared homeland for Black Jews and others in Palestine.

He was inspired by the pre-Israeli state Zionist movement, encouraged his black congregants to stand in solidarity with pre-Israeli state Zionists, and saw his own fate as intertwined with the fate of other Jewish people. He wrote in a Hebrew-language flyer: " It is a fact that our Jewish brothers in Europe and America ca not hold and defend Palestine; but our black Jewish brothers in India, China and Abyssinia have a little more skill in warcraft than the normal and heroic Jew."

== Legacy ==
In 2016, a mural in Jerusalem was unveiled that honors Mordecai Herman. The mural was painted by the British Israeli artist Solomon Souza.

According to the opinion of Black Orthodox Jewish writer and activist Shais Rishon, Mordecai Herman was non-Jewish as no records have been located to support that Herman ever "belonged or converted to any official branch of Judaism." However, it is probable that Herman was, in fact, an Ethiopian Jewish rabbi, as he operated a formal Hebrew school for Jewish boys until his death. Rishon believes that the Black Hebrew Israelite movement is not part of "the mainstream normative Black Jewish community" that practices Rabbinic Judaism.

== See also ==
- Black Jews in New York City
