= Israelite Rabbinical Academy =

American Black Hebrew Israelite academy

The Israelite Rabbinical Academy is a Black Hebrew Israelite academy in the United States that is affiliated with the International Israelite Board of Rabbis.

== History ==
The academy originated as an offshoot of Wentworth Arthur Matthew's Royal Order of Ethiopian Hebrews, founded in 1925. In 1970, under the leadership of Chief Rabbi Levi Ben Levy, the Ethiopian Hebrew Rabbinical College was renamed the Israelite Rabbinical Academy. The academy was established under the charter of the International Israelite Board of Rabbis in the New York City.

== Relationship with Rabbinic Judaism ==
The Black Orthodox Jewish writer and activist Shais Rishon has written that the Israelite Rabbinical Academy is not a Jewish institution, rejecting their use of the word rabbi. According to Rishon, Wentworth A. Matthew, Levi Ben Levy and others associated with the board never "belonged nor converted to any branch of Judaism", nor have any graduates of the academy with the exceptions of Capers Funnye and Eli Aronoff.

In September, 2022, Eliyahu Elijah Collins was hired as an associate rabbi by Congregation Ahavas Sholom in Newark, New Jersey. Collins, a student of the Israelite Rabbinical Academy, was the first time that the Conservative movement had appointed a Hebrew Israelite rabbi. Robert Azriel Devine, another Hebrew Israelite, was also hired by Congregation Ahavas Sholom in the same year. Their hiring violated the hiring regulations of the United Synagogue of Conservative Judaism which requires member congregations to hire from approved rabbinical schools. The hiring of Hebrew Israelites sparked controversy in the Jewish community. Three rabbis representing the United Synagogue of Conservative Judaism wrote an opinion piece published in the Jewish Telegraphic Agency reiterating their belief that Judaism and Hebrew Israelism are different religions and that Hebrew Israelites are not Jewish unless they convert to Judaism.

== Graduates ==
- Capers Funnye

== See also ==
- Black Hebrew Israelites
- Black Jews in New York City
- International Israelite Board of Rabbis
