= Arnold Josiah Ford =

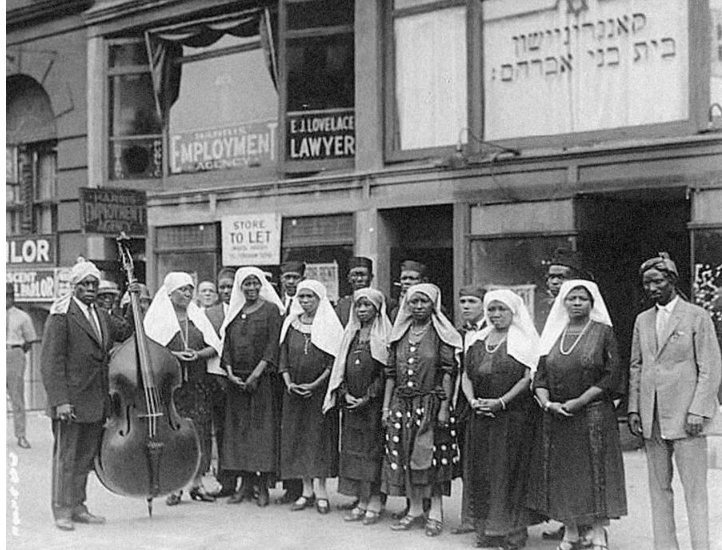
Congregation of the Beth B’Nai Israel Synagogue, Harlem, 2925. Josiah Ford is on the left

Arnold Josiah Ford (23 April 1877 – 16 September 1935) was a Barbadian American spiritual leader, recognized as a pioneering figure of the Black Hebrew movement.

== Biography ==
Ford was born in Barbados to Edward Thomas Ford and Elizabeth Augustine Ford. He grew up to become a musician in the Royal Navy before settling in the United States. Talented as a linguist, poet, musician and composer of many Universal Negro Improvement Association and African Communities League (UNIA-ACL) songs, Ford co-authored The Universal Ethiopian Anthem with Benjamin E. Burrell. Ford officially functioned as director of UNIA Band, Orchestra, Band of the African Legion, and the Liberty Hall Choir. He published the Universal Ethiopian Hymnal in 1920.

Following Garvey’s arrest and conviction, Ford founded the Beth B’Nai Israel Synagogue in a Harlem storefront, and declared himself to be a rabbi. He was never recognized as such by the wider Jewish community. In 1930 he and a small group of Black Jews went to Ethiopia, where they participated in the coronation of Emperor Haile Selassie. They created a school, and acquired 800 acres (320 ha) of land for the purpose of uniting Black Jews of the Diaspora with their brothers already in Ethiopia. He died there in 1935. His daughter Arlein Ford Straw became a composer, music educator, and church music director in New York City.

While Ford's religious congregations did not survive, his influence is strongest through Wentworth Arthur Matthew, one time student of Ford, and founder of the Commandment Keepers. Ford provided Matthew with a certificate of rabbinic ordination from Ethiopia, signed by himself as the "Chief Rabbi of Ethiopia".

Shais Rishon, a Black Orthodox Jewish writer and activist, has claimed that "Ford never belonged nor converted to any branch of Judaism."
