= African-American Jews =

People who are both African American and Jewish

Total population
- c. 100,000 - 200,000

Regions with significant populations
- United States

Languages
- English, Hebrew, Yiddish, French, Portuguese, Amharic, Tigrinya, Sefwi, Igbo, Venda, IsiNdebele, Karanga, Pedi and other African languages

Religion
- Judaism

Related ethnic groups
- African American, African-American Muslims, American Jews, African Jews, African Muslims

African-American Jews are people who are both African American and Jewish, whether by mixed ancestry or conversion. African-American Jews may be either Jewish from birth or converts to Judaism. Many African-American Jews are of mixed heritage, having both non-Jewish African-American and non-Black Jewish ancestors. Many African-American Jews identify as Jews of color, but some do not. Black American Jews from Africa, such as the Beta Israel from Ethiopia, may or may not identify as African-American Jews.

== History ==
=== Early history ===
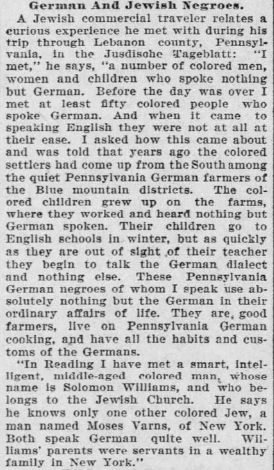
An 1899 Baltimore Sun article mentioning German-speaking Black Jews in Pennsylvania and New York.

Caribbean Jews became members of Ashkenazi Jewish synagogues in the United States and also contributed to the formation of early Black Hebrew Israelite congregations in Harlem during the early 20th century.

Several historic Jewish congregations in the United States mention early African-American worshippers. Lucy Marks (1778-1838), who lived with and worked for the Marks family of Philadelphia, was known as a "devout observer of the precepts of Judaism" and sat in the women's section of Mikveh Israel during services. Upon her death, the Marks family successfully petitioned to have her buried in the Spruce Street Cemetery, where today she rests in an unmarked grave next to Haym Salomon. Billy Simmons (1780-1860) attended services at Beth Elohim in Charleston, South Carolina, even though its constitution forbade converts with African ancestry from being members.

=== 20th century ===
By the first part of the 20th century, at least eight different African-American run religious organizations self-identified as Jewish. Most traced or claimed connections either to the Caribbean or Ethiopia. Today African-American Jews worship both in predominantly African-American congregations and predominantly mixed congregations.

In New York City, African-American Jews have been present since colonial times, with many having Caribbean Sephardi roots. The portraits of Sarah Brandon Moses and Isaac Lopez Brandon, both born enslaved in Barbados and later living in New York City, are the oldest known paintings of Jews with African ancestry.

A Black Sephardi community existed in Harlem during the 1970s; it descended from Black Southerner slaves who had been owned by white Sephardi slave owners. In accordance with Deutoronomy Chapter 15, which implies that "bondsmen" in Jewish households should also be Jewish, Sephardi slave owners converted their slaves to Judaism. Many of the freed Sephardi slaves passed their religion on to their children and grandchildren. Birmingham wrote that "Black Sephardim are as fiercely proud of their ancient religion as white Sephardim, and consider themselves among the elite of Jewry."

=== Contemporary African-American Jews ===
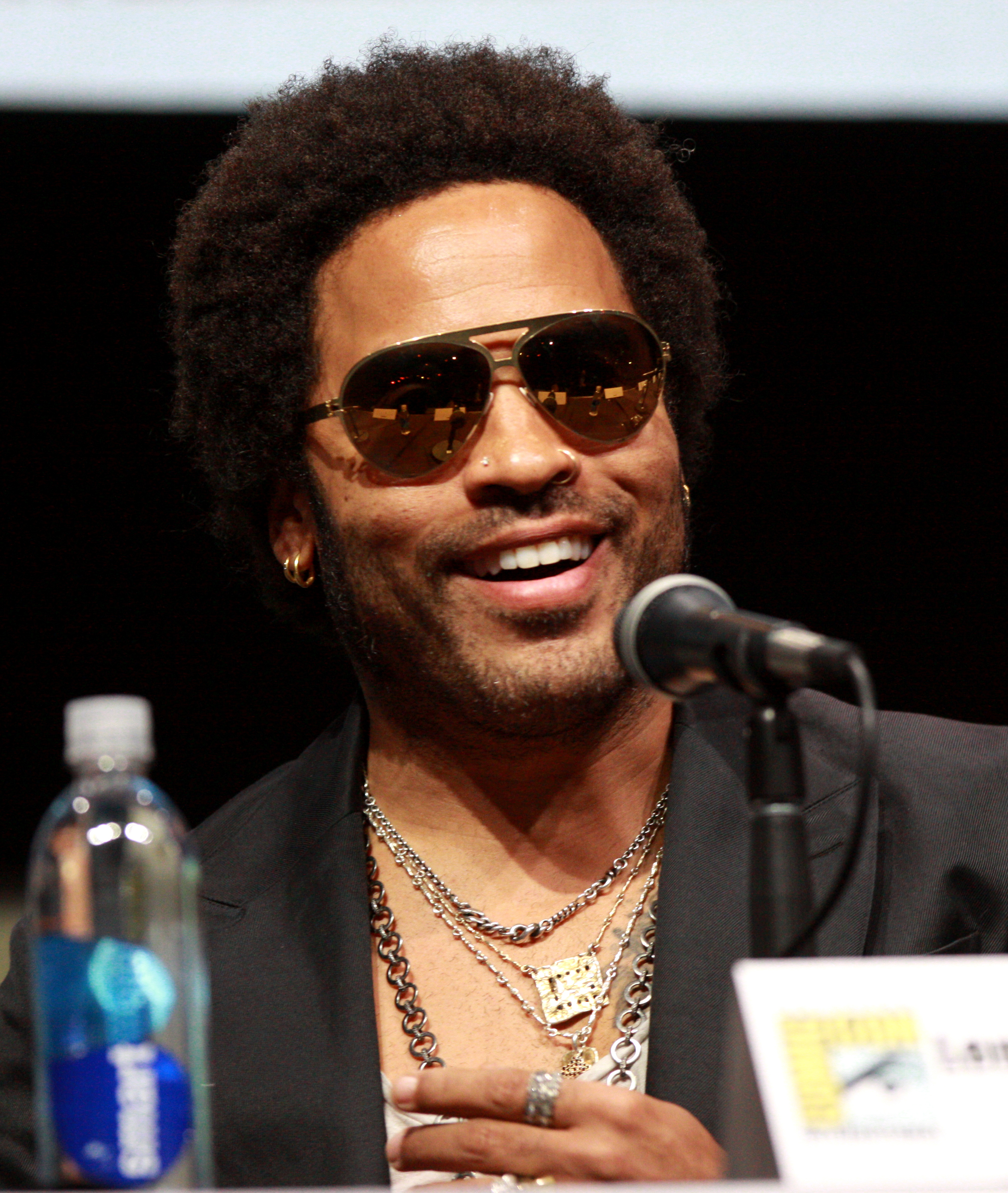
Musician Lenny Kravitz (whose father was of Ashkenazi ancestry and Ukrainian-Jewish background) refers to himself as being "half-Jewish"

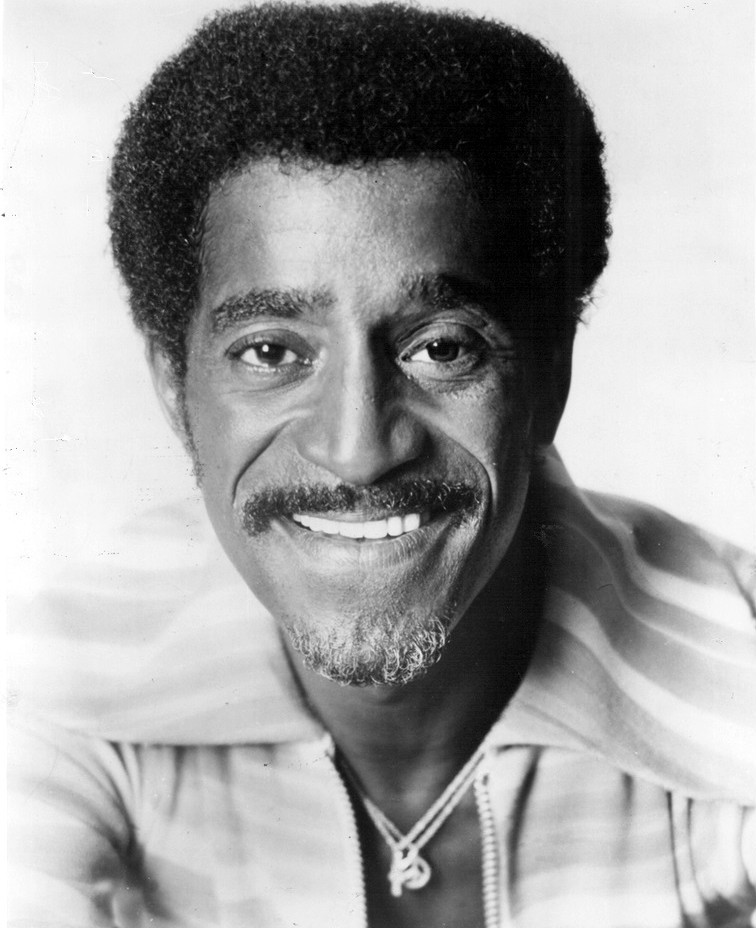
Singer, actor, and comedian Sammy Davis Jr., who was a convert to Judaism

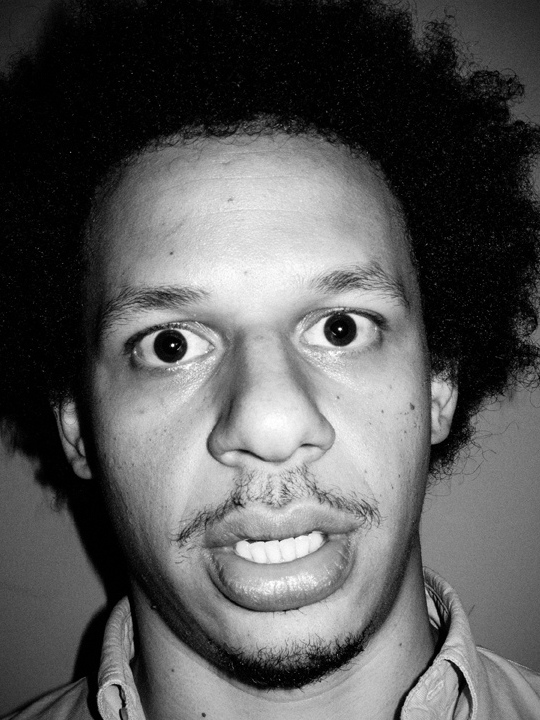
Comedian Eric André, the son of an Ashkenazi Jewish mother and an Afro-Haitian father

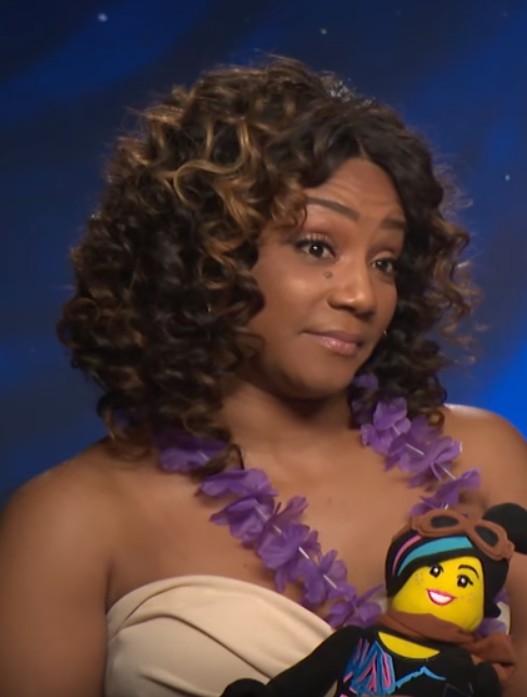
Actress and comedian Tiffany Haddish, who converted to Judaism after learning that her late father had been African Jewish

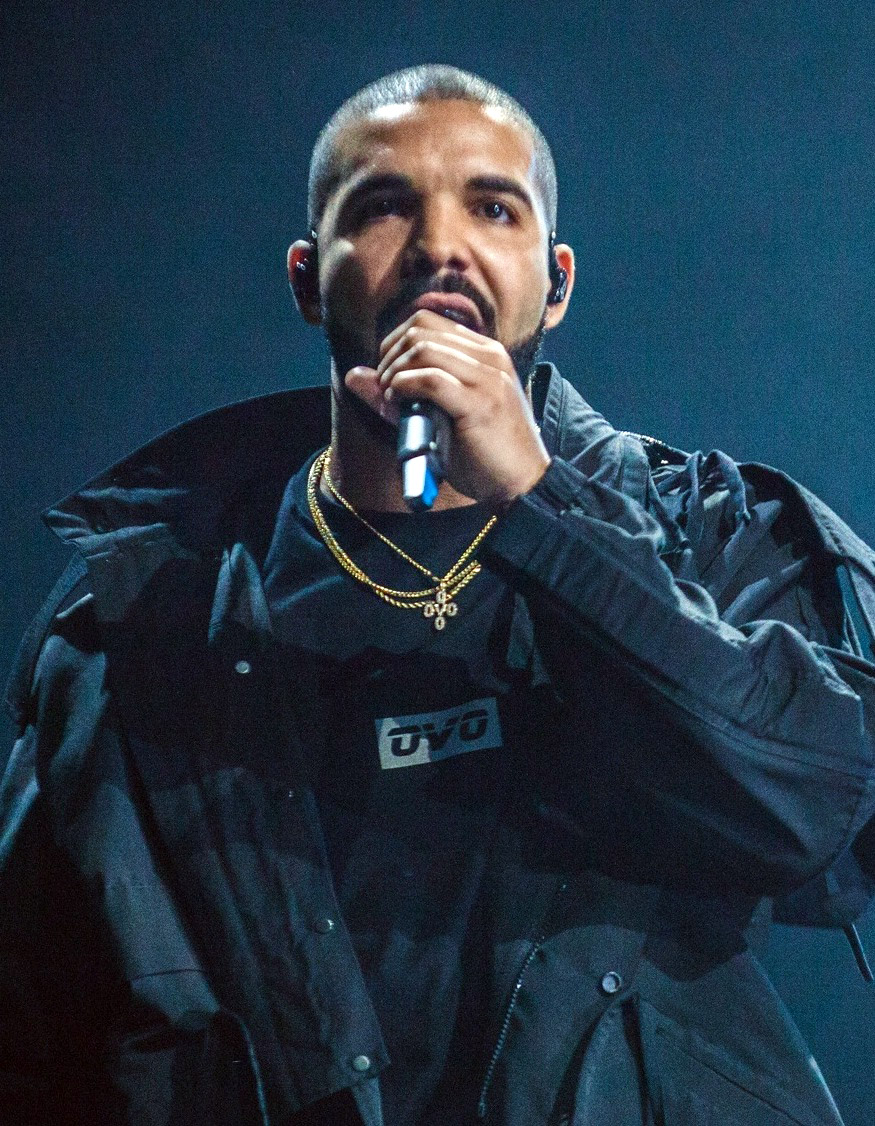
Rapper Drake (a dual-citizen of Canada and the United States), born to an African-American father and a Canadian Ashkenazi Jewish mother and an adherent of the Jewish faith since youth

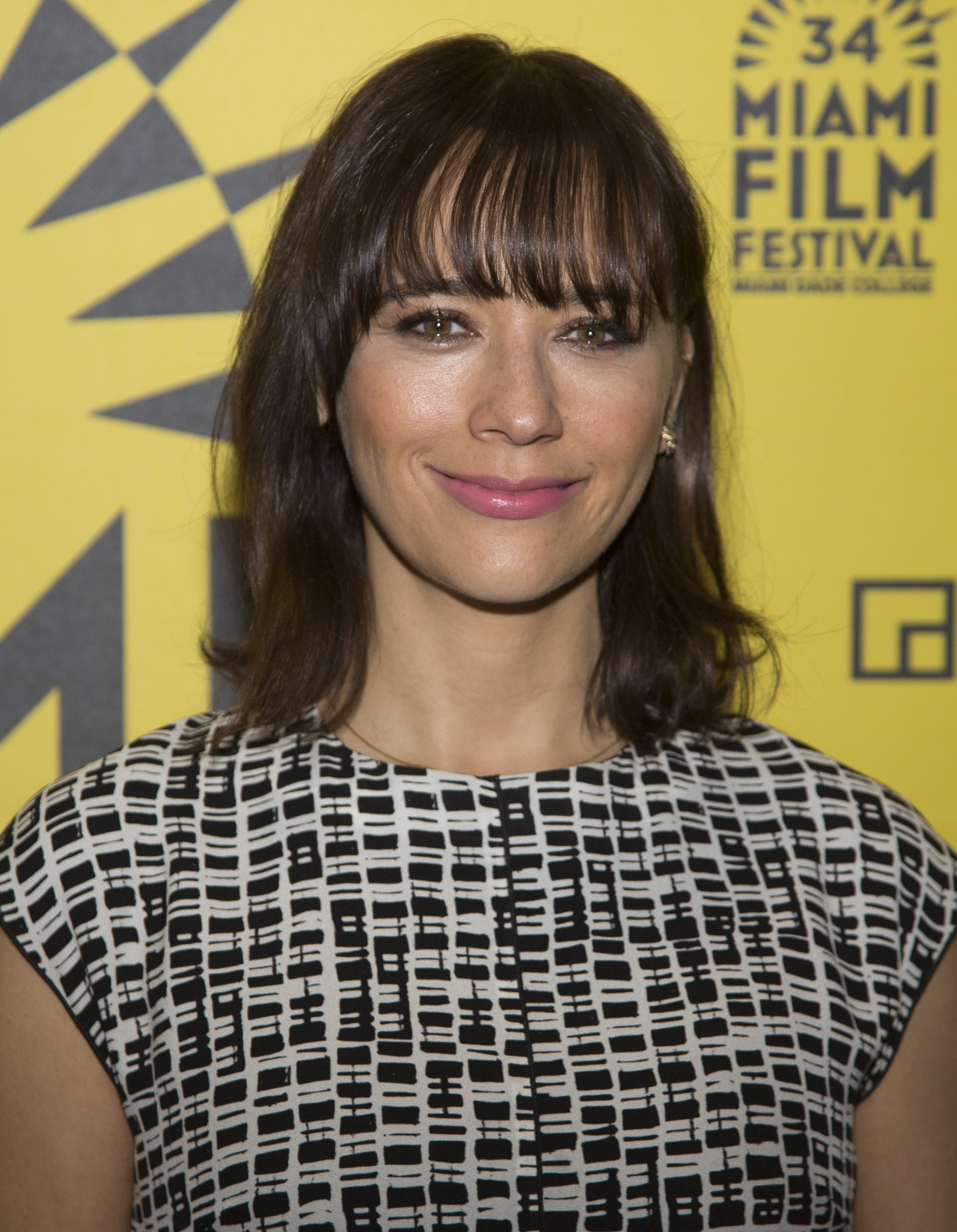
Actress and filmmaker Rashida Jones is the daughter of an African-American father (Quincy Jones) and an Ashkenazi Jewish mother (Peggy Lipton), and was raised in the tradition of Reform Judaism

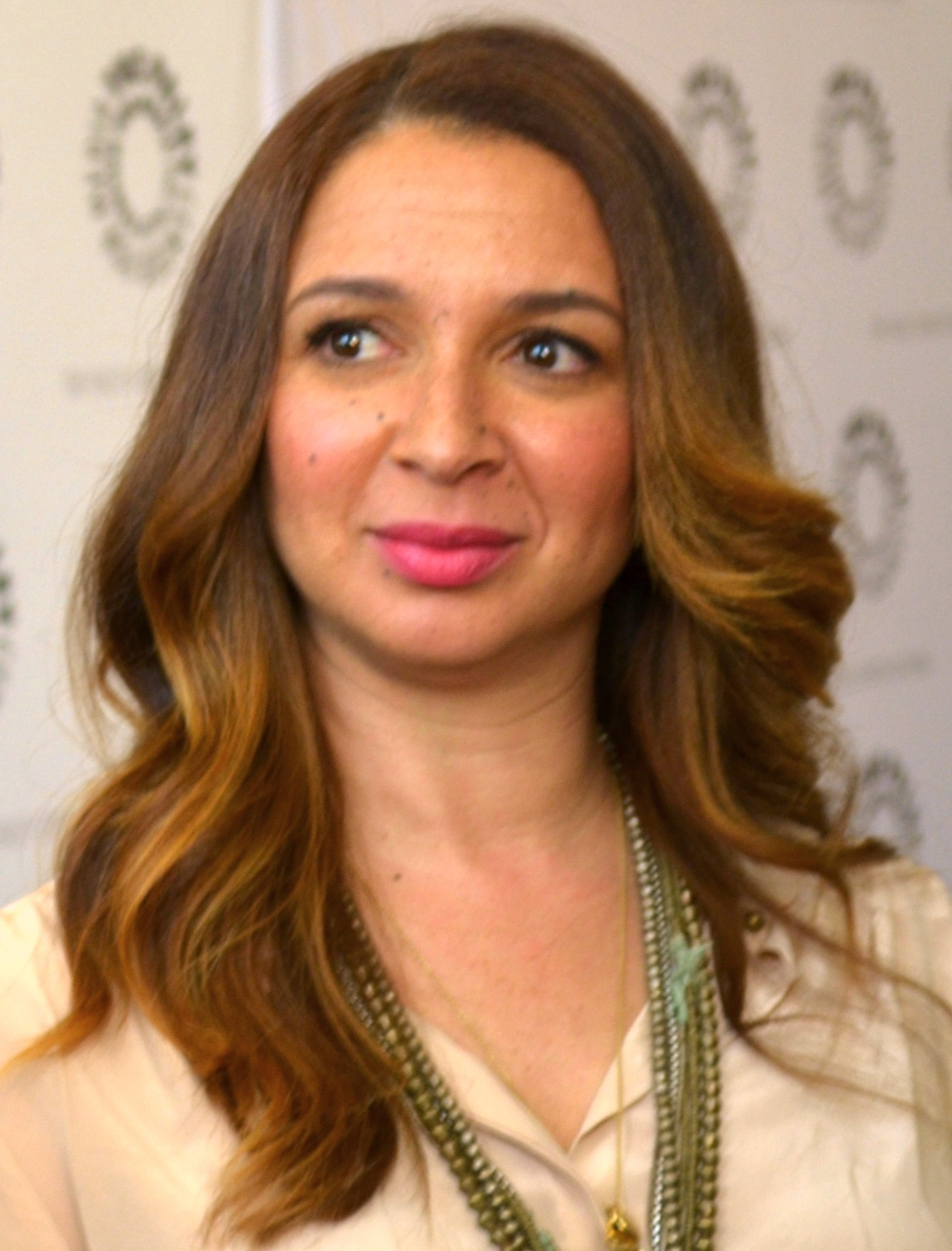
Actress and comedian Maya Rudolph is the daughter of a Jewish father (Richard Rudolph) and an African American mother (Minnie Riperton)

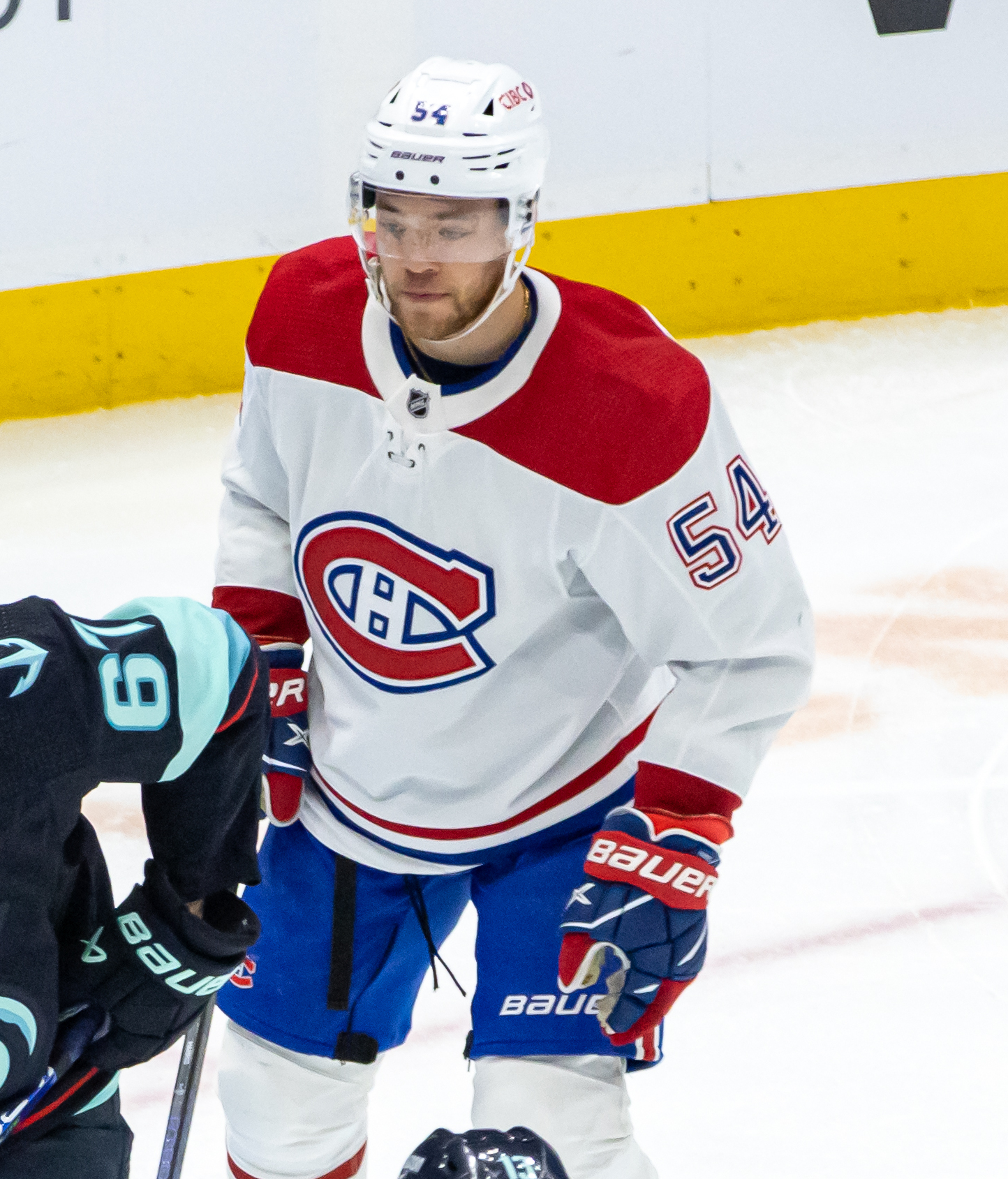
Ice hockey player Jordan Harris is the son of an African-American Jewish father and was raised Jewish

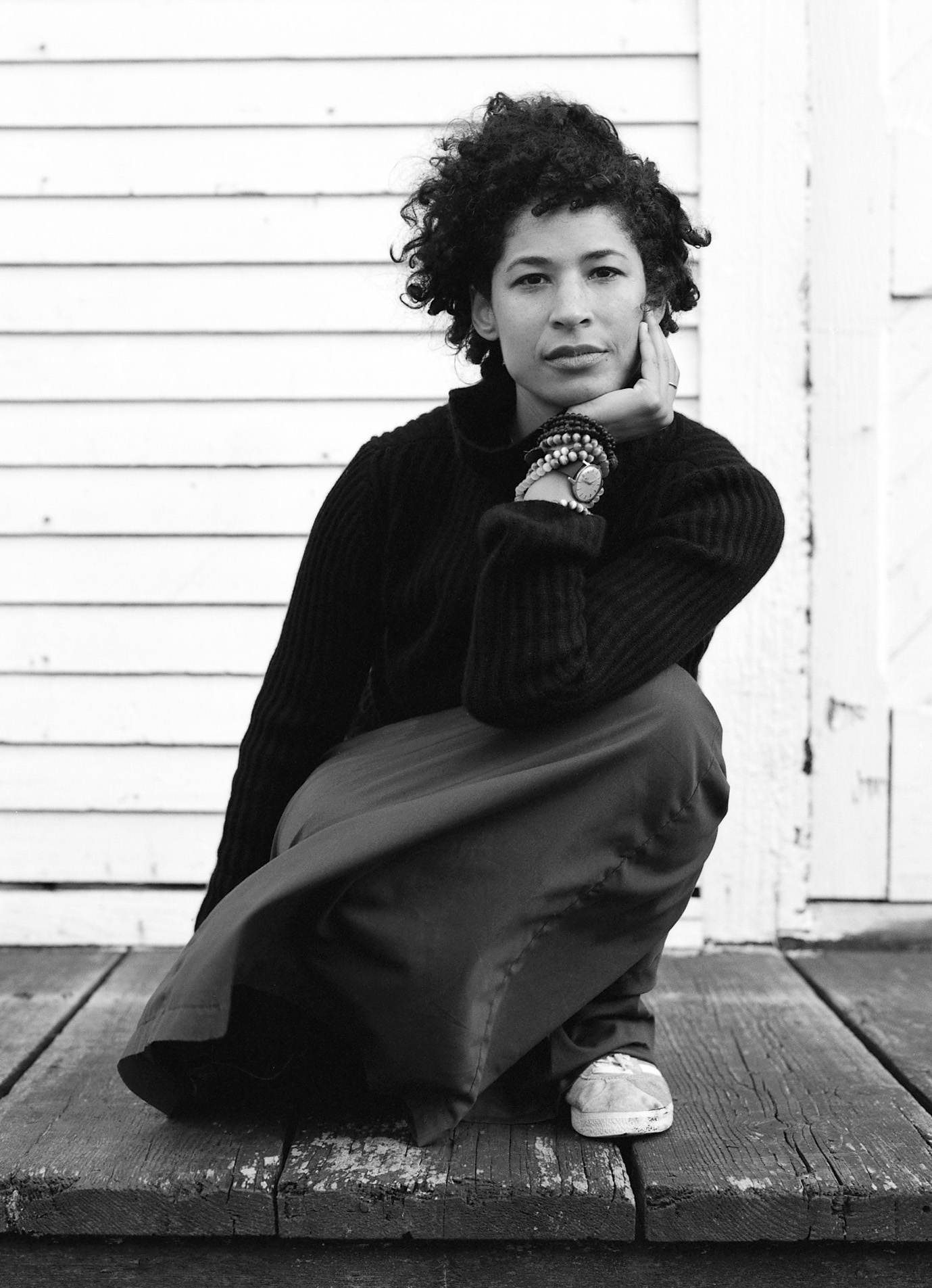
Feminist activist Rebecca Walker, the daughter of an African-American mother (Alice Walker) and Jewish father (Melvyn R. Leventhal)

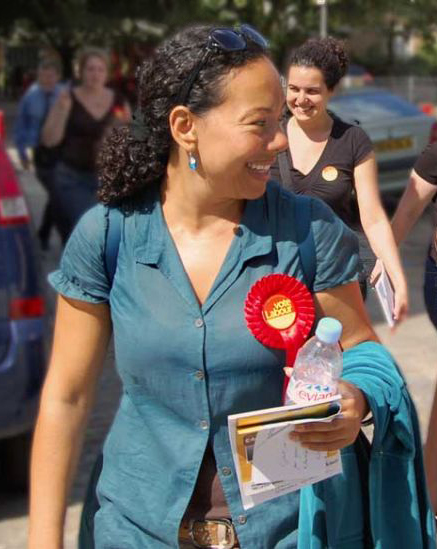
British politician Oona King, the daughter of an African-American father (Preston King) and British Jewish mother

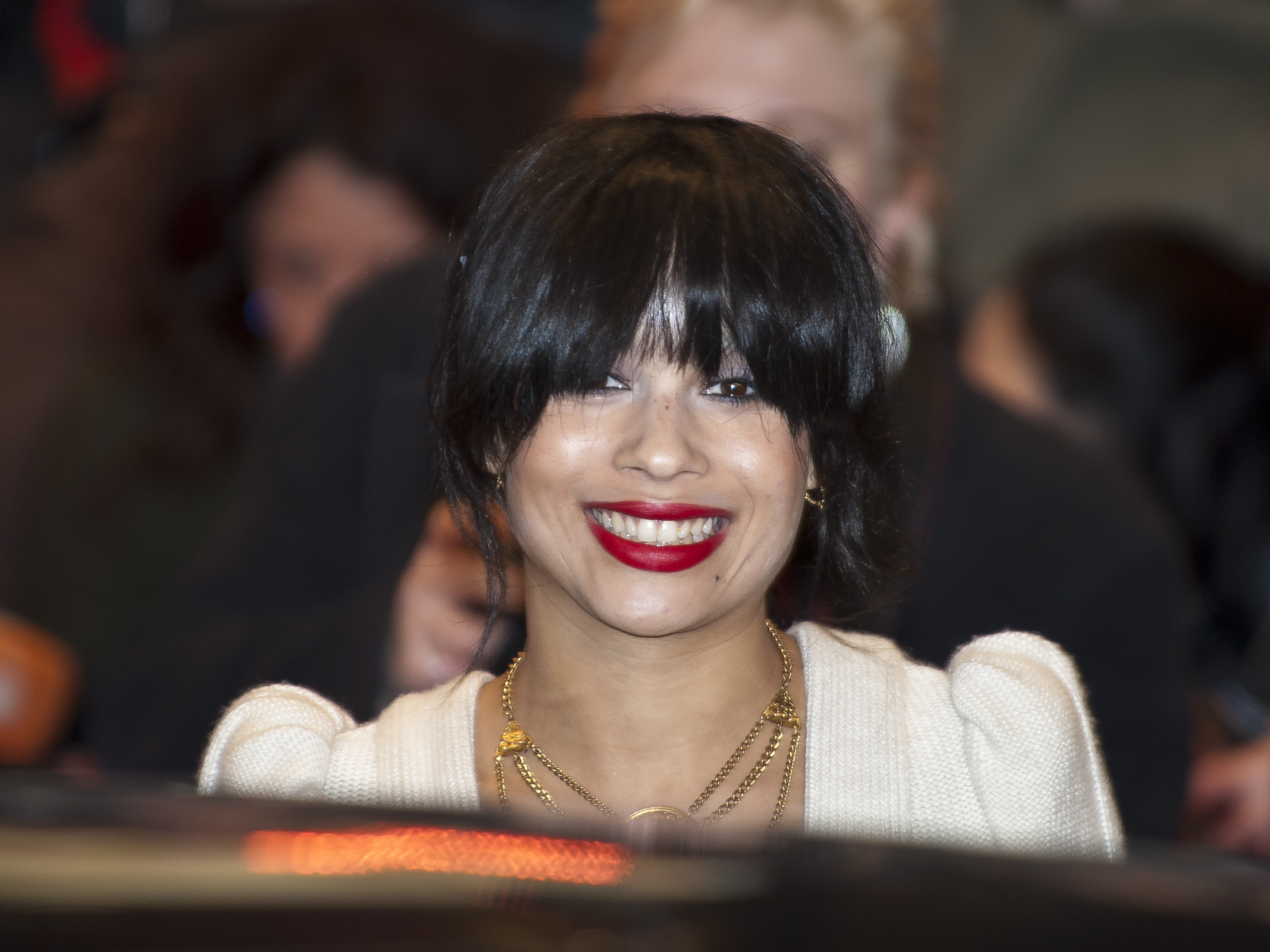
Actress Zoë Kravitz's (whose father is Lenny Kravitz and mother is Lisa Bonet) has Ashkenazi Jewish heritage through both maternal grandmother and paternal grandfather and African-American heritage through both her maternal grandfather and paternal grandmother. Kravitz, who does not practice the Jewish faith, considers herself "mixed" and having Jewish heritage

The American Jewish community includes Jews with African-American backgrounds. Like their other Jewish counterparts, there are African-American Jewish secularists and African-American Jews who may rarely or never take part in religious practices.

A small, tight-knit Black Orthodox Jewish community exists in Brooklyn, about 50 or 60 among the 500,000 Orthodox Jews in the New York City area as of 2012. There is no specific documentation of the exact number of Black Orthodox Jews in New York City, but the numbers are small yet growing. Black Orthodox Jews have struggled to form a minyan in Crown Heights.

In 1963, the Central Conference of American Rabbis issued a responsa written by Rabbi Solomon Freehof titled "Miscegenation and Conversion of Negroes", stating that there was no prohibition in Reform Judaism against interracial marriage, citing the marriage of Moses to Zipporah, an Ethiopian woman. The responsa describes the conversion of African-Americans to Judaism as a "troublesome situation", because a "Negro becoming a Jew subjects himself to double difficulties." Freehof wrote that he would discourage an African-American man who wanted to marry a Jewish woman "For the sake of their happiness", but would not refuse.

Robin Washington, an American journalist and filmmaker, became one of three founders of the National Conference of Black Jews, later called the Alliance of Black Jews. It was conceived to build bridges among all African-American Jews, who are affiliated with many different groups. Estimates of the number of black Jews in the United States range from 20,000 to 200,000.

There are several predominantly African-American Jewish or Black Hebrew Israelite congregations in the United States, most of which are affiliated with the Black Hebrew Israelite movement. Most notably, Beth Shalom B'nai Zaken Ethiopian Hebrew Congregation is a Black Hebrew Israelite synagogue in Chicago, Illinois. The congregation leader of Beth Shalom is Conservative Rabbi Capers Funnye, a Black Hebrew Israelite leader. Its assistant rabbis are Avraham Ben Israel and Joshua V. Salter. The congregation, which has about 200 members, is mostly African-American. The congregation was started by Rabbi Horace Hasan from Bombay (now Mumbai), India, in 1918 as the Ethiopian Hebrew Settlement Workers Association, and it was influenced by Wentworth Arthur Matthew's Commandment Keepers.

Shais Rishon, a Black Orthodox Jewish writer and activist, has stated that the "mainstream normative Black Jewish community" is distinct from the Black Hebrew Israelite movement and that Black Hebrew Israelites do not share the same identity, community, or issues as Black Jews. Rishon objects to the erasure of Black Jews, saying that Black Hebrew Israelites are not a denomination of Judaism and that the two communities are commonly confused or conflated.

Black Jewish communities, such as those founded by Rabbi Wentworth Matthew in the 1920s, have existed in cities like New York since the late 19th/early 20th century. A 2021 Pew Research Center survey indicated that 8% of American Jews identify as non-White, with studies noting this population is growing, despite historically being undercounted.

== See also ==
- Alliance of Black Jews
- African American–Jewish relations
- African Americans in Israel
- Black Hebrew Israelites – groups of African Americans who believe that they are the descendants of the ancient Israelites
  - Black Judaism
- Darhe Jesarim
- Genetic studies of Jews
- History of the Jews in Africa
- History of the Jews in Suriname
- Jewish diaspora
- Jewish ethnic divisions
- Jewish history
- Jews of color
- List of African-American Jews
- Black, White, and Jewish
- Racism in Jewish communities
  - Racism in Israel
- Religion of Black Americans
- The Whipping Man
- The Color of Water
- Who is a Jew?
