= Executive Order 60 =

2025 New York City executive order

Government of New York City
- Long title: Procurement and Investment Decisions Relating to Israel and Israeli Citizens
- Territorial extent: New York City
- Enacted by: Mayor of New York City
- Enacted: December 2, 2025
- Repealed: January 2, 2026
- Status: Repealed

Executive Order 60, titled Procurement and Investment Decisions Relating to Israel and Israeli Citizens was an executive order issued by then Mayor of New York City Eric Adams on December 2, 2025. The order barred city agencies from participating in Boycott, Divestment and Sanctions (BDS) efforts. The order was opposed by the Council on American–Islamic Relations.

It was revoked by Adams' successor Zohran Mamdani on January 2, 2026, his first day as mayor. The revocation was criticized by the UJA-Federation of New York, the New York Board of Rabbis, and the Israeli Ministry of Foreign Affairs.
