= Jewish Council on Urban Affairs =

American nonprofit organization

- Formation: 1964
- Type: Social justice
- Headquarters: Chicago, Illinois
- Board President: Sara Cantor
- Executive Director: Jessica Schaffer
- Website: www.jcua.org

Jewish Council on Urban Affairs (JCUA) is a nonprofit organization based in Chicago that mobilizes the Jewish community of the region to advance racial and economic justice. JCUA partners with diverse community groups across the city and state to combat racism, antisemitism, poverty and other forms of systemic oppression, through grassroots community organizing, youth education programs, and community development.

== About ==
According to Slingshot, a Resource Guide to Jewish Innovation, "For 45 years, the Jewish Council on Urban Affairs (JCUA) has been perceived by many as the social consciousness of the Chicago-area Jewish community". According to Sojourners magazine, JCUA is the preeminent model for today's Jewish social justice organizations. As a Chicago-based organization, JCUA pioneered the American Jewish community's participation in social justice work. Since 1964, JCUA has been working with neighborhoods targeted by social and economic depression and collaborates actively with immigrant communities to promote human rights and social justice. Working with other community-based organizations, JCUA focuses on issues that affect urban communities, such as "poverty, education, employment, housing, transportation and crime". JCUA mobilizes the Chicago-area Jewish community in an effort to build partnerships and to advocate on behalf of disenfranchised Chicago residents.

== History ==
=== Early activity ===
JCUA was founded in 1964 by Rabbi Robert Marx, who at the time was the Midwest Director of the Union of American Hebrew Congregations (now the Union for Reform Judaism) and a committed civil rights activist.

JCUA's origins can be traced to the civil rights movement of the 1960s when Rabbi Robert Marx marched alongside Rev. Dr. Martin Luther King Jr. in his Open Housing March in Marquette Park. JCUA was established as a Jewish voice promoting human rights and social justice for Chicago's neighborhoods. In its early years, JCUA worked with the Contract Buyers League to fight unfair real estate practices in Westside homes that were causing excessive fines and evictions of black homeowners.

The first staff member of JCUA was Lewis Kreinberg, a young graduate student of the University of Wisconsin. Kreinberg's first assignment was to work with the Northwest Community Organization (NCO) to counter slum landlords who were exploiting tenants. Kreinberg worked extensively with community organizations on the Westside of Chicago such as in Lawndale with the Lawndale Peoples Planning and Action Council and the Westside Federation. Kreinberg represented JCUA as a staff member loaned to Martin Luther King Jr. the Campaign to End the Slums. Kreinberg worked extensively, as well, in Pilsen with 18th St. Development Corporation and Pilsen Housing and Business Alliance.

=== 1970s ===
JCUA continued its extensive work with community-based organizations in very low income and oppressed communities responding to local issues including gentrification, discrimination, school and housing desegregation, political and social disenfranchisement and government corruption. The organization also supported non-profit community-based developers, advocated for improved tenant living conditions, assisted in organizing tenant unions, and aided in the formation and staffing of the Public Welfare Coalition.

JCUA focused on supporting local organizing and the empowerment of Chicago's most oppressed communities, working closely with Chicago's diverse racial, ethnic, and religious groups. By working actively in partnership with grassroots community-based organizations, JCUA helped to build strong relationships with diverse groups, sharing common agendas, strengthening their commitments and capacity to create progressive coalitions and bring about social change. For example, JCUA joined a coalition with African American and Latino communities to address job discrimination in Chicago-area corporations and to protest the Nazi march in Marquette Park. Working with local organizations in West Town, JCUA rallied in opposition to the post office, which at the time was practicing employment discrimination against Latino.

The Union of American Hebrew Congregations (now the Union for Reform Judaism) and JCUA created a summer youth program called the Youth Mitzvah Corps, empowering young people to volunteer in the inner city.

=== 1980s and 1990s ===
Jane Ramsey was the organization's executive director from 1980 to 2012. As the [American] public was awakening to South Africa's system of institutionalized racism, JCUA passed a resolution that condemned South Africa's apartheid policies and called upon the organization's membership to divest from companies engaged in business with South Africa.

As in the previous decade, JCUA continued its focus on local social services, assisting in the formation and staffing of the Chicago Coalition for Voter Registration, a group organized to educate about widespread homelessness in Chicago. Continuing its struggle for increased affordable housing, JCUA developed strategies to provide more low-income rental properties for the Latino community in Humboldt Park and for homeless women in Uptown, Edgewater, and Rogers Park. Working in several coalitions, JCUA continued the struggle for the preservation and rehabilitation of low-income and public housing. The Community Ventures Program allowed JCUA members to provide no-interest loans to non-profit developers.

Other JCUA campaigns focused on hunger and workers rights. Working with ICARE, JCUA organized statements for City Council which advocated for increased city funding and resources for hunger alleviation. With the Living Wage Campaign, JCUA fought for the Living Wage Ordinance which demanded employers with city contracts or city subsidies to pay employees a living wage.

JCUA helped initiate Progress Illinois, a group of Illinois-based organizations that supported a graduated state income tax which would alleviate the tax burden for middle and low-income families, also allowing for additional state revenue to fund education and human service programs.

JCUA developed several Jewish initiatives that worked to organize the American Jewish community around issues of social justice. The Judaism and Urban Poverty (JUP) curriculum was developed to be used in synagogue religious schools in order to teach Jewish youth about the institutional and structural causes of poverty. The JUP curriculum instructed children about the social responsibility, informed by Jewish perspectives, to improve the living conditions of those most in need. JCUA also assisted in the creation of a national organization called AMOS. The mission of AMOS was to make social justice a top concern of American Jewry. The Urban Mitzvah Corp was initiated as a program for Jewish college students over their winter breaks. Program participants rehabilitated housing with Habitat for Humanity and learned about poverty from community experts and local rabbinic leaders. To strengthen relationships between black and white Jews, JCUA created an educational and social program called Shalem (Hebrew for "Making Whole"). The program developed strategies to raise public awareness of African American Jews.

=== 2000s to the present ===
Marking the fifth anniversary of the Congress Hotel strike, JCUA mobilized more than 70 members of the Jewish community, including several rabbis, to support the strikers who are seeking workers' rights, such as living wages and basic benefits. JCUA members and participants have continued to picket along with striking workers at the hotel through the seventh anniversary of the strike in 2010.

Demanding political accountability, JCUA along with several other community organizations created a comprehensive agenda to hold local government officials accountable. This campaign is known as "Developing Government Accountability to the People" or DGAP. In 2010, DGAP published updated information on the records of Chicago aldermen and asked local citizens to grade their alderman on the DGAP website.

JCUA has worked to ensure broad healthcare access in Illinois. JCUA won an increased 2008 budget for the Cook County Bureau of Health along with the creation of an independent board of directors that would take control of managing Cook County's public health care system, the second largest of such programs in the country. JCUA continued its work to preserve affordable housing in the city of Chicago. The organization assisted residents of housing projects in filing a lawsuit, claiming that orders for the residents to relocate violated their human rights.

After 9/11, in the wake of increased prejudice against Muslims, JCUA created the Jewish-Muslim Community-Building Initiative (JMCBI), a program that brings together members from both faith groups through cultural and educational opportunities. JMCBI mobilizes Jews and Muslims to advocate collaboratively around several social justice campaigns.

Together with the Community Renewal Society, JCUA convened the Justice Coalition of Greater Chicago (JCGC), which brought together 100 faith-based, civil rights, other types of organizations to battle police and criminal prosecutorial misconduct. In a landmark success, JCUA and JCGC won a moratorium on the death penalty in Illinois, postponing all lethal injections until investigations could conclude why more Illinois executions had been overturned rather than carried out. JCUA initiated Or Tzedek, the Teen Institute for Social Justice. Or Tzedek is an urban-immersion program aimed at strengthening teens' Jewish identities though social justice education and direct activism.

After the 2008 Immigration and Customs Enforcement (ICE) raid and the subsequent bankruptcy of Agriprocessors, Inc. kosher meatpacking plant in Postville, Iowa, JCUA and Jewish Community Action of St. Paul, Minnesota, were invited to join the Postville Community Benefits Alliance (PCBA). PCBA is a coalition of organizations that is working to ensure that the new owners of the plant (now called Agri Star) continue to distribute kosher meat products and that the company is held accountable to provide employees with safe working conditions and fair treatment.

JCUA has been active in advocating for federal comprehensive immigration reform, and has "often been the public face of the Jewish community's response to the immigration debate in Chicago." JCUA supports legislation that would provide illegal immigrants with an avenue to achieve citizenship and advocates a ban on deportations.

== Current activities ==
JCUA works to end racism, poverty and antisemitism by mobilizing the Jewish community of Chicago to advance racial and economic justice. It is the only Jewish organization based in Chicago using a community organizing model to advance systemic change on domestic issues with a local focus. JCUA has three core program areas: grassroots organizing campaigns, youth engagement and community development.

JCUA works on grassroots organizing campaigns with its 2,000 members and in partnership with more than 100 community organizations across the city and state. As a member-driven organization, JCUA selects issue campaigns based on the input and deliberation from its core membership base. In the past, JCUA has worked on campaigns focused on civil rights, public housing, police brutality, immigration reform, and worker rights.

Currently, JCUA is active on four issue-based campaigns. Its immigration justice campaign, in coalition with the Illinois Coalition for Immigrant and Refugee Rights, focuses on making Chicago and Illinois safer for immigrant communities. The coalition seeks to shut down Chicago's Gang Database, end collaboration between city agencies and federal law enforcement, and remove carve-outs in Chicago's Welcoming City Ordinance. Its police accountability campaign focused on reforming policing and public safety in Chicago, by implementing civilian oversight over the Chicago Police Department and reforming police union contracts. Its Fair Tax campaign focuses on passing the Illinois Fair Tax referendum in the 2020 election, which would amend the Illinois constitution to remove the state's flat tax and implement a progressive tax system. Its Right to Recovery campaign focuses on ensuring an equitable response to the COVID-19 pandemic, and that essential workers and communities of color are adequately served by city and state governments.

JCUA focuses on preserving affordable housing opportunities for low-income Chicagoans and strengthening Chicago neighborhoods through its Community Ventures Program (CVP). CVP functions as a revolving loan fund that provides nonprofit developers with $100,000 zero-interest loans for predevelopment costs on their projects. Since 1991, CVP funds have led to the creation of 4,200 units of affordable housing and more than 1,000 living-wage jobs.

JCUA runs two youth engagement programs for teens and college-aged students focusing on community organizing through a Jewish lens. The programs give participants the opportunity to engage with issues such as affordable housing, health care, immigration, poverty, and homelessness. Participants learn about social justice issues through a Jewish lens while meeting and volunteering with community leaders and experts.

== Recognition ==
- JCUA was included in the 2009–2010 and the 2010–2011 editions of Slingshot, an annual guide that highlights innovative Jewish non-profit organizations. JCUA was the only Chicago-based organization to be selected in Slingshot's most recent publication
- The "Forward 50" is an annual list published by The Jewish Daily Forward that highlights 50 of the most influential leaders in the American Jewish community. In 2009, The Forward included JCUA's former executive director, Jane Ramsey. "In almost every social and economic justice issue that came up in Chicago—homelessness, unemployment, community reinvestment, racism, anti-Semitism—Ramsey was there, providing Jewish leadership".

== See also ==
- Jewish Funds for Justice
- Tikkun olam
- Unite Here
- Jill Jacobs (rabbi)
- Capers Funnye
- Jewish left
