= The Bay State Banner =

African-American newspaper in Boston

- Type: Weekly newspaper
- Format: Tabloid
- Owner(s): Ron Mitchell & André Stark
- Founder: Melvin B. Miller
- Publisher: Ron Mitchell
- Editor: Ron Mitchell
- COO: André Stark
- Founded: 1965; 60 years ago
- Headquarters: Dorchester, Boston
- Circulation: 27,400 (as of 2023)
- ISSN: 1946-6730
- OCLC number: 6749070
- Website: baystatebanner.com
- Free online archives: npaper-wehaa.com/baystatebanner/cs2 (since November 16, 2017)

The Bay State Banner is a weekly newspaper primarily geared toward the readership interests of the African-American community in Boston, Massachusetts. Distributed free of charge, it was founded in 1965 by Melvin B. Miller, who remained the chief editor and publisher until March 2023. In 2015, the publication celebrated its 50th anniversary serving the region's minority-oriented neighborhoods.

Notable journalists who have worked at The Bay State Banner include PBS host Gwen Ifill and NPR commentator Robin Washington. Bryant Rollins, a former reporter for The Boston Globe and a community activist and author, served as the Banner's first editor.

== History ==
The Bay State Banner was started in 1965 by Melvin B. Miller, who served as the publication's chief editor and publisher, with the help of his brother Jack Miller. A native of Boston, Miller graduated from Boston Latin School, Harvard University, and Columbia Law School, and received Doctor of Humane Letters honorary degrees from Suffolk University and Emerson College.

The Bay State Banner’s first issue, on September 25, 1965, ran with a headline reading "What’s Wrong With Our Schools?" next to photographs of the Gibson School in Dorchester, which had an all-black student population, and the newly opened Henry Grew School in predominantly white Hyde Park.

Miller stated that he considered the Banner to be a successor to the Boston Guardian, a local newspaper founded in 1901 that aimed to represent black Bostonians until its closure in the 1950s, in that the Banner offered coverage of issues that affect the diverse community that lives in Boston, rather than those who commute in or visit. Inspired by the passing of the Civil Rights Act of 1964 just one year prior, Miller opened the Banner in an effort to empower black voices, and combat media representation of black Bostonians as "losers" (Miller quipped that Boston is a "city of winners", regardless of race). Miller hoped to expose what he viewed as Boston's unique form of racism, and subvert the control white Irish Catholics held over both the city and the media at the time. The paper went on to cover the Boston desegregation busing crisis, and the actions taken by the NAACP’s Ruth Batson. The Banner has been cited as a precursor to Stokely Carmichael’s work.

From its inception, the Banner has covered and supported local community efforts in Roxbury and its surrounding neighborhoods, including Operation Head Start and Action for Boston Community Development. Miller sought to differentiate the paper from other "black papers" of the time by covering important and controversial stories, and taking strong stances on them.

Miller frequently cited his wife, Sandra Casagrand, as an important business partner who helped him navigate the paper through the "roughest seas".

=== 1966 hiatus ===
In April 1966, less than a year after the Banner was founded, it went out of business for four weeks due to a lack of advertising revenue, the headline read "Banner Being Forced Out Of Business". Almost immediately after the paper folded, community residents formed a Committee to Save the Banner, which put pressure on local businesses to advertise in order to support the paper. Four weeks later the Banner was back on the stands.

=== 2009 hiatus ===
The Banner suspended publication on July 9, 2009, laying off its staff of 12. In the last edition of the paper before this suspension, Miller summarized that he was looking for investors in order to resume publication, but that the Banner's free-distribution of 30,000 copies was not sustainable in the face of falling ad revenue. Harvard University law professor Charles Ogletree started lining up investors to save the Banner but the publication ended up accepting a $200,000 bailout loan by then-Mayor of Boston Thomas Menino from the Boston Local Development Corp., a nonprofit administered by the Boston Redevelopment Authority (BRA). Miller said the loan would help the paper survive while it arranged a new business plan with Next Street Financial LLC, a financial services company. Boston Local Development, the nonprofit arranging the loan, made similar loans to local businesses, including a coffee shop and bicycle company. Menino had been running for reelection at the time and had often been criticized by the Banner, which at one point suggested in an editorial that he step down from office. Menino said he was not trying to influence the paper with the loan offer, but wanted to "help a business that is very important to the minority community."

=== 2013 loan audit and controversy ===
On January 12, 2014, following Menino's end of term, The Boston Globe published an article publicizing Miller's personal financial records, along with the financial situation of the Banner. The article questioned the necessity of the bailout five years prior. The same week, the Banner accused the Globe of defamation in an open letter, claiming bias in their coverage of the Banner's current financial situation, which claimed that the paper remained more than $200,000 in debt following the near closure in 2009, losing nearly $400,000 between 2009 and 2012, with ad revenue dropping 17 percent in three years. This coverage followed an audit launched by the Boston Finance Commission into the BRA-associated loan. The BRA defended the loan, standing by Menino's argument that the loan was important to save a business that was "very important to the minority community".

=== 2018 "Boston Revisited" showcase ===
In 2018, the Banner was the subject of an exhibition at the Howard Gotlieb Memorial Gallery at Boston University's Mugar Memorial Library entitled "Boston Revisited: 50 Years of the Bay State Banner". The exhibit featured a photographic history of Boston's black community through photography from the Banner archives, including examples of Boston's news, politics, editorials, arts, sports, education and business from the last half century. This showcase accompanied a book entitled Boston’s Banner Years: 1965–2015: A Saga of Black Success, produced by Miller and the writers of the Banner.

=== 2023 sale ===
On March 1, 2023, the Banner announced the sale of the publication from Miller, then aged 88, to Ron Mitchell, a former videojournalist at WBZ-TV, and André Stark, a filmmaker. Mitchell was announced as publisher and editor, and Stark as chief operating officer. Also announced was an expanded coverage area for the Banner, with four editions: Boston, Connecticut, Rhode Island, and northern New England.

== Format ==
The Banner's initial format was a 10-page broadsheet, switching to a tabloid in 1968. In 2005, the paper's staff of 20 produced issues up to 40 pages long, distributed on Thursdays.

The Banner is also available online, and the publication's physical archives reportedly contain "about 36 boxes of Bay State material" consisting of more than 60,000 photographs.
