= Capers Funnye =

African-American rabbi (1952–2026)

Rabbi Capers Funnye
- Born: Capers C. Funnye Jr. April 14, 1952; Georgetown, South Carolina, U.S.
- Died: November 2, 2026 (aged 74); Chicago, Illinois, U.S.
- Occupation: Conservative rabbi
- Spouse: Mary White
- Children: 4
- Relatives: Michelle Obama (first cousin once removed)

Capers C. Funnye Jr. (/fəˈneɪ/; April 14, 1952 – November 2, 2026) was an African-American Conservative rabbi. (Note: Funnye took his ordination from the Israelite Board of Rabbis. He participated in two conversion rituals with a panel of Conservative and Orthodox rabbis.) As Chief Rabbi of the International Israelite Board of Rabbis, he led the 200-member Beth Shalom B'nai Zaken Ethiopian Hebrew Congregation of Chicago, Illinois, assisted by rabbis Avraham Ben Israel and Joshua V. Salter. He led efforts to coordinate with both Black Hebrew Israelite groups and mainline Judaism.

== Early life and education ==
Capers C. Funnye Jr. was born on April 14, 1952, in Georgetown, South Carolina, in the Low Country, with paternal ancestry among the Geechee people (or Gullah) of the Sea Islands. They are an ethnic group that kept strong African traditions. Variations of his surname are common in Nigeria and West Africa.

His family moved to Chicago as part of the Great Migration of African Americans to industrial cities out of the South. He grew up on the South Side. There he got to see more of his mother's extended family in Chicago, including future First Lady of the United States Michelle Obama, his first cousin once removed. His mother Verdelle (née Robinson) Funnye was a sister of Fraser Robinson Jr., Michelle (née Robinson) Obama's paternal grandfather; their family also was from Georgetown and had Gullah ancestry.

Funnye was raised in the African Methodist Episcopal Church, the first independent black denomination. At 17, he was encouraged by his minister to enter the clergy. Dissatisfied with Christianity during his college years at Howard University and influenced by movements for civil rights and black nationalism, he investigated other religions, including Islam. After meeting with Rabbi Robert Devine, the spiritual leader of the House of Israel Congregation in Chicago, which practiced a kind of Messianic Judaism, Funnye joined his congregation. Related Black Hebrew Israelite movements in the United States had started in the late 19th century in Kansas.

He became drawn to the teachings of Levi Ben Levy, the Brooklyn-born black chief rabbi of the International Israelite Board of Rabbis. This group has its roots in the Commandment Keepers Congregation of the Living God, founded in 1919 by Wentworth Arthur Matthew in Harlem. It incorporated in 1930 and later moved to Brooklyn, where Matthew established a seminary. After Matthew's death in 1973, there had been little dialog with white Jewish congregations, who disagreed with Black Hebrew Israelite claims of historic descent from ancient Israel. Funnye studied long-distance with Levy for five years, and Levy ordained him in 1985 through the Israelite Rabbinical Academy of Brooklyn, founded by Matthew. The academy does not have ties to any mainstream Jewish denomination.

With the goal of building bridges to United States Judaism, in 1985 Funnye undertook a second formal conversion to Judaism that was certified by a Conservative rabbinical court. He had also studied Judaism more intensively in Chicago, earning a Bachelor of Arts degree in Jewish Studies and Master of Science in Human Service Administration from the Spertus Institute of Jewish Studies there. Funnye said that he felt a sense of intellectual and spiritual liberation in the constant examination that Judaism encouraged.

== Career ==
In 1985, Funnye was selected as assistant rabbi at Beth Shalom B'nai Zaken Ethiopian Hebrew Congregation in Chicago; with 200 members, it is now one of the largest black synagogues in the United States. Its congregation is mostly African American. Funnye was the first African-American member of the Chicago Board of Rabbis, and served on the boards of the Jewish Council on Urban Affairs and the American Jewish Congress of the Midwest. In 1996, Funnye was the only black rabbi in the Chicago area.

Funnye was active in the Institute for Jewish and Community Research, reaching out to historically black Jewish communities outside the United States. These include the Beta Israel in Ethiopia, which are formally recognized by Israeli authorities as Jewish, and the Igbo Jews in Nigeria, which are not.

Funnye's congregation was founded by Rabbi Horace Hasan from Bombay (now Mumbai), India, in 1918 as the Ethiopian Hebrew Settlement Workers Association. Along with African Americans, members include Hispanics and whites who were born Jews; the majority of the congregation has converted to Judaism. As is traditional with Judaism, the congregation does not engage in missionary activity. Members who want to convert must study Judaism for a year before undergoing a traditional conversion, requiring men to be ritually circumcised and women to undergo ritual immersion in a mikvah. The synagogue is "somewhere between Conservative Judaism and Modern Orthodox" with distinctive African-American influences; while men and women sit separately as in Orthodox synagogues, a chorus sings spirituals to the beat of a drum. The congregation occupies a synagogue built by an earlier Ashkenazi congregation in the Marquette Park neighborhood. Funnye said in 1995 that they had not applied to belong to any mainstream synagogue organizations, as they did not feel the need.

In 1995, Funnye was a co-founder, with Michelle Stein-Evers of California and Robin Washington of Boston, of the National Conference of Black Jews. Washington is also Jewish and is the editor of the African-American newspaper, Bay State Banner. They have worked to broaden the conversation among black Jews and Black Hebrews across the country, as well as to build bridges to conventional Judaism, made up predominately of whites. Funnye said, "I am a Jew, and that breaks through all color and ethnic barriers."

On April 2, 2009, Funnye was invited for the first time "to speak at a white, mainstream synagogue in New York", at the Stephen Wise Free Synagogue, a Reform congregation. He called it his "Broadway debut". The congregation had reached out to black Jewish congregations to celebrate Martin Luther King Jr. Day, and about one-quarter of the audience were black Jews. Funnye spoke about King and Barack Obama, the night before the latter's inauguration as president. The next day he and his family went to Washington to join the Obamas in inaugural events.

In October 2015, Funnye was installed as Chief Rabbi of the International Israelite Board of Rabbis. In August 2016, he was inaugurated to that position. The board is made up of "people who identify themselves as Black Jews or Israelites."

In 2021, he ordained Tamar Manasseh; this made her the first woman ordained as a rabbi at the synagogue Beth Shalom B'nai Zaken Ethiopian Hebrew Congregation.

== Personal life and death ==
Funnye married Mary White of Chicago. Her brother Frank White Jr. is a businessman who served on Barack Obama's national finance committee during his first presidential campaign. They had four children.

Funnye died from cancer on November 2, 2026, at the age of 74.
