= Beth Shalom B'nai Zaken Ethiopian Hebrew Congregation =

Black Hebrew Israelite synagogue in Chicago

- Location in greater Chicago, Illinois

Religion
- Affiliation: Judaism
- Rite: Black Hebrew Israelite
- Ecclesiastical or organisational status: Synagogue
- Leadership: Avraham Ben Israel (Assistant); Joshua V. Salter (Assistant)
- Status: Active

Location
- Location: 6601 South Kedzie Avenue, Marquette Park, Chicago, Illinois
- Country: United States
- Coordinates: 41°46′24″N 87°42′09″W

Architecture
- Founder: Horace Hasan
- Established: 1918 (as a congregation)

Website
- bethshalombz.org

Beth Shalom B'nai Zaken Ethiopian Hebrew Congregation, more commonly known as Beth Shalom B'Nai Zaken EHC, or simply Beth Shalom, abbreviated as BSBZ EHC, is a Black Hebrew Israelite congregation and synagogue at 6601 South Kedzie Avenue in Chicago, Illinois, in the United States. The synagogue was led by Capers Funnye, the Chief Rabbi of the International Israelite Board of Rabbis, with assistant rabbis Avraham Ben Israel and Joshua V. Salter. Beth Shalom is affiliated with the International Israelite Board of Rabbis.

== History ==
The congregation was started by Horace Hasan, a rabbi from Bombay, India, in 1918 as the Ethiopian Hebrew Settlement Workers Association, and was influenced by Wentworth Arthur Matthew's Commandment Keepers.

In 2021, Tamar Manasseh became the first woman ordained as a rabbi at the synagogue; she was ordained by Capers Funnye.

== Overview ==
The congregation has approximately 200 members, the majority of whom are African American.

Along with African-Americans, members include Hispanic Jews and Ashkenazi Jews, as well as former Christians and Muslims. As is traditional with Judaism, they do not seek converts, and members must study Judaism for a year before undergoing a traditional conversion requiring men to be ritually circumcised and women to undergo ritual immersion in a mikvah.

The congregation has been described as being "somewhere between Conservative and Modern Orthodox" with distinctive African-American influences; while men and women sit separately as in Orthodox synagogues, a choir sings spirituals to the beat of a drum. It follows traditional Jewish liturgy and laws, including Sabbath and "a modified version of kosher dietary laws".

The congregation is housed in a previously existing synagogue purchased from the Lawn Manor Hebrew Congregation, a Conservative synagogue of Ashkenazi Jews at West 66th Street and South Kedzie Avenue in the Marquette Park neighborhood on Chicago's South Side.
