= Frank Cherry =

Black Hebrew Israelite leader

Frank S. Cherry (c. 1875–1963) was an American man who was the founder and leader of one of the early Black Hebrew Israelite groups in the United States.

== Biography ==
Little is known about Cherry's early and adult life, other than that he was born in the Southern United States. He did not go to school but educated himself in both Hebrew and Yiddish and worked as a sailor, during which he claims to have been declared a prophet. He was a 33rd Degree Scottish Rite Mason, and member of the Big Brothers organization.

Cherry claimed to have had a vision that African Americans are the descendants of the ancient Israelites, during his time abroad. He then established and led a congregation in Chattanooga, Tennessee, in 1886, where he preached that white people were inherently evil and hated by God. He would attempt to spread this belief in Philadelphia, Pennsylvania, where he established the Church of God in 1915. Tenets of his group, known as the Church of the Living God, the Pillar Ground of Truth for All Nations, were based on black nationalist rhetoric of the time and he himself was a supporter of Marcus Garvey. Cherry also espoused antisemitism, claimed that the earth is square, and professed that Jesus would return in the year 2000 to start a race war.

Cherry was engaged in construction and maintenance, working on freight ships and railroads before taking over a religious congregation. He taught that God, Jesus, Adam, and Eve were black and established the Church of the Living God, the Pillar Ground of Truth for All Nations in 1886 which has served as a focal point of the modern Black Hebrew Israelite movement.

After his death, he was succeeded as the church's leader by his son Prince Benjamin F. Cherry.

Shais Rishon, a Black Orthodox Jewish writer and activist, stated that Cherry was "a southern Baptist who never belonged nor converted to any branch of Judaism."

== See also ==
- William Saunders Crowdy
