= New York Board of Rabbis =

The New York Board of Rabbis is an organization of Orthodox, Reform, Conservative and Reconstructionist rabbis in New York State and the surrounding portions of Connecticut and New Jersey.

The roots of the New York Board of Rabbis date to 1881 with the establishment of the New York Board of Jewish Ministers by Rabbis Gustav Gottheil, Adolph Huebsch, Henry S. Jacobs, Kaufmann Kohler, Frederick de Sola Mendes and Abraham Pereira Mendes, who came from differing branches of Judaism, hoping to work together to foster Jewish education and advance Judaism. The New York Board of Rabbis was formally adopted as the organization's name in 1946.

Protests were lodged against the 1948 film Oliver Twist noting that Alec Guinness's portrayal of Fagin was considered antisemitic. Guinness wore heavy make-up, including a large prosthetic nose, to make him look like the character as he appeared in George Cruikshank's illustrations in the first edition of the novel. As a result of objections by the Anti-Defamation League of B'nai B'rith and the New York Board of Rabbis, the film was not released in the United States until 1951 with seven minutes of profile shots and other parts of Guinness's performance removed from the film.

Rabbi Wentworth Arthur Matthew (1892–1973), founder of the Commandment Keepers, a distinct sect of Black Hebrew Israelites which does not spread hateful rhetoric against white people and Jews, applied for membership in the New York Board of Rabbis, but was denied due to neither being Jewish nor having converted to any traditionally Jewish sect.

In 2005, the Board of Rabbis and the New York Catholic League issued a joint statement condemning the pop-culture Chrismukkah, calling it a "multicultural mess" that is "insulting" to both Jews and Christians.

The current president is Rabbi Ammiel Hirsch. Rabbi Joseph Potasnik serves as Executive Vice President and Rabbi Diana Gerson is the Associate Executive Vice President.

== See also ==
- Long Island Board of Rabbis
