= Arlein Ford Straw =

American composer

- Arlein Ford Straw, from a 1967 publication
- Born: January 15, 1920; New York City
- Died: February 10, 2009 (aged 89); New York City
- Other name: Arlene Ford Straw
- Occupations: Music teacher, composer
- Spouse: Irving Straw
- Parent(s): Arnold Josiah Ford, Olive Nurse Ford

Arlein Ford Straw (January 15, 1920 – February 10, 2009) was an American music teacher and composer. She helped create The National Association for the Advancement of Colored People (NAACP) songbook.

== Early life and education ==
Ford was born in New York City, the second daughter of Arnold Josiah Ford and Olive Nurse Ford. Her father was from Barbados, a musician and religious leader known as "Rabbi Ford". After her parents separated in 1924, she lived in Barbados for a few years, then in Harlem, where she played piano with her father and her sister Enid.

Ford graduated from Wadleigh High School for Girls in 1936, and won a Rachel Herstein Scholarship from the NAACP to attend Hunter College. She graduated from Hunter in 1940, and earned a master's degree there in 1962; her thesis was a composition, a musical setting of Psalm 139.

== Career ==
During and after college, Ford and her older sister Enid played piano for children's shows called Ella Gordon's "Peter Pan Kiddies". She taught music at schools in Queens, and chaired Negro History and Brotherhood Week observances for the Jamaica branch of the NAACP. In 1952, her work was performed at the annual meeting of the National Association of Negro Musicians. She contributed music to a 1958 event organized by composer Margaret Bonds, in tribute to poet Langston Hughes. She served on the committee to develop Lift Ev'ry Voice, the NAACP's official songbook. She was a church music director in her later years.

Straw composed several works, including "Sudan" (1951), "Lullaby Little One" (1953), with Rena Greenlee Govern, "Crucifixion" (1957) for three female voices, "Two Songs of Freedom" (1967), with lyrics by her NAACP colleague Florence V. Lucas, and Bent Twig (1998), a "folk opera" with lyrics by her neighbor, social work professor Helen Roberts Williams. When Bent Twig was performed in Baltimore in 1998, she and other members of her church in Queens took a bus together to attend the performance.

== Personal life ==
Arlein Ford married railroad worker Irving Straw in 1940. They had two children, Clyde and Gerald. She died in 2009, at the age of 89, in New York City.
