= Florence V. Lucas =

American lawyer

- Florence V. Lucas, from a 1960 issue of The Crisis
- Born: October 10, 1915; New York City
- Died: September 6, 1987; New York City
- Occupation(s): Lawyer, state official

Florence Victoria Lucas (October 10, 1915 – September 6, 1987) was an American lawyer and state official. She was president of the Jamaica, Queens branch of the NAACP in the 1950s and 1960s, and was Deputy Commissioner of the New York State Division of Human Rights from 1972 to 1975. She was the first Black woman elected to the Judicial Council of the United Methodist Church.

== Early life ==
Lucas was born in New York City, the daughter of Charles Lucas and Maybelle L. Hunter Lucas. She graduated from John Adams High School, Hunter College, and Brooklyn Law School in 1939.

== Career ==
In 1940, Lucas was the first Black woman from Queens admitted to the New York bar. In 1941 she worked in the Office of Price Administration (OPA) in Washington, D.C. After World War II she returned to New York and had a private law practice in Queens from 1954 to 1966. She was appointed to the state Human Rights Commission in 1966, and was deputy commissioner of the New York State Division of Human Rights from 1972 until she retired from government work in 1975. In the late 1970s and 1980s she was a consultant on affirmative action programs.

Lucas was active in the Queens County Women's Bar Association, the Urban League, the National Conference of Christians and Jews, and the National Council of Negro Women. She was president of the Jamaica branch of the NAACP from 1953, and held statewide offices in the organization as well. In 1957, she ran unsuccessfully for a seat on the City Council. She was director of the Samuel Huntington Community Center in South Jamaica. She served on the board of trustees of Marymount Manhattan College, and received an honorary doctorate from Marymount Manhattan College in 1986. She was the first Black woman elected to the Judicial Council of the United Methodist Church.

Lucas enjoyed music as a hobby. She founded and directed a girls' choir at Brooks Memorial Methodist Church. In 1960, she and Arlein Ford Straw wrote "Two Songs for Freedom".

== Personal life ==
Lucas married twice. She had a son in the 1940s with her first husband. She died from cancer in September 1987, aged 71 years, at her home in the Rosedale neighborhood of Queens. She was survived by her second husband, D. Rex Edwards.
