= The Whipping Man =

Play by Matthew Lopez

The Whipping Man is a play by Matthew López set in the immediate aftermath of the American Civil War during Passover.

== History ==
The play debuted at Luna Stage in Montclair, New Jersey in 2006 and premiered Off-Broadway at the Manhattan Theatre Club on February 1, 2011, directed by Doug Hughes and starring Andre Braugher and Andre Holland. The Off-Broadway production of The Whipping Man was extended four times, and won the 2011 Obie Award for Performance (Braugher) and the 2011 Lucille Lortel Award for Outstanding Lighting Design. López won the John Gassner New Play Award. The Whipping Man was Matthew López's first play.

Braugher and Holland both earned critical acclaim for their performances. Between 2012 and 2016, The Whipping Man was one of the most widely produced plays in America.

== Setting and plot ==
The Whipping Man is set in a looted and burned Richmond, Virginia mansion in the immediate aftermath of the American Civil War and concerns two recently freed slaves encountering their former master. The former slaves, like their former master, identify as Jewish. The play examines the unique occurrence of Passover in 1865 beginning the day after Robert E. Lee's surrender at Appomattox. It explores the meaning of freedom, and the various ways people are enslaved — to addictions, to prejudices.

The plot centers heavily on the ironies of formerly enslaved people celebrating Passover, which celebrates the freeing of the Jews from slavery in Egypt and their exodus, with their former enslaver.

== Reception ==
In his The New York Times review, Charles Isherwood called the play "emotionally potent, almost surreal in the layers of meaning it conjures."

== See also ==
- African-American Jews
- The Inheritance (play)
- History of the Jews in the Southern United States
