= Alliance of Black Jews =

American organization

The Alliance of Black Jews was an American organization that was started in Chicago, Illinois, in 1995 by a group of African Americans who self-identified as Jews and Black Hebrews. At the time, they claimed to have estimated that there were about 200,000 black Jews in the United States. The figure, which included Black Hebrew Israelites (not recognized as Jews by any Jewish movement), as well as Reform, Conservative, Orthodox and Reconstructionist African-American Jews by birth or conversion, was based in part on the 1990 Jewish Population Study, which gave figures ranging from 135,000 to 260,000, depending on the definition of a Jew.

The individuals involved in forming the organization included Robin Washington, Michelle Stein-Evers, and Rabbi Capers C. Funnye Jr.

The organization is no longer operational.

== See also ==
- American Jews
- Black Hebrew Israelites
- Jewish anti-racism
