= Edith Bruder =

French ethnologist

Edith Bruder is a French ethnologist who has specialized in the study of African Judaism and religious diasporas, new religious movements, and marginal religious societies. She is a research associate at the School of Oriental and African Studies (SOAS), University of London; a research associate at the French National Center for Scientific Research (CNRS); and a research fellow at the Faculty of Theology's School of Biblical Studies and Ancient Languages, North-West University, South Africa.

She is president and founder of the International Society for the Study of African Jewry – ISSAJ. She is also involved in the development of research in philanthropy in Europe in collaboration with the Center for Research in Philanthropy (CerPhi) in Paris, France and the European Network on Philanthropy (ERNOP).

Bruder lives in Paris, where she received her education. She holds a Ph. D. in Ethnology and History from SOAS, a DESS in Clinical Psychology from Paris Diderot University, and a DEA in Art History from Pantheon-Sorbonne University.

== Work ==
Bruder's most significant publication, The Black Jews of Africa – History, Identity, Religion (2008), was based on extensive field work. It was the first such work to provide scientific data and a reference list that deals comprehensively with the issue of Judaism in western, central, eastern and southern Africa.

Bruder examines the trend towards Judaism in Africa at large, and explores the interdisciplinary concepts of "metaphorical diaspora," global and transnational identities, and colonization.

Bruder is a co-author of a documentary Black Jews: Juifs Noirs d’Afrique (work in progress) widely drawn from her fieldwork, with Laurence Gavron as filmmaker (Schuch Productions).

Bruder is co-editor of African Zion: Studies in Black Judaism which is an examination of Black Judaism in Africa, the United States and India.

=== Books ===
- Bruder, E. (2008). The Black Jews of Africa, History, Identity, Religion. Oxford University Press. ISBN 9780195333565.
- Bruder, E.; Parfitt, T., eds. (2012). African Zion: Studies in Black Judaism. Cambridge Scholars Publishing. ISBN 9781443838023.

=== Articles in books ===
- Bruder, E. (2008). "Constructions d'identités juives en Afrique sub-saharienne (Constructions of Jewish Identities in Sub-Saharan Africa)". In Trigano, Shmuel (ed.). Juifs et Noirs, du mythe à la réalité. Pardes. ISBN 9782848351490.
- Bruder, E. (2008). "Tribus perdues d'Israël en Afrique (Lost Tribes of Israel in Africa)". In Trigano, Shmuel (ed.). Juifs et Noirs, du mythe à la réalité. Pardes. ISBN 9782848351490.
- Bruder, E. (2006). "Noirs et Juifs: Les Black Jews aux Etats Unis, Genèse d 'un mouvement judaïsant au 20ème siècle" [Blacks and Jews: Black Jews in the United States – Genesis of a Judaizing Movement in the 20th Century]. Diasporas, Histoire et Sociétés. 9. CNRS.
- Bruder, E. (2011). "The Beit Avraham of Kechene: The Emergence of a New Jewish Community in Ethiopia". In Trevisan Semi, E.; Weil, S. (eds.). Beta Israel: The Jews of Ethiopia and Beyond. Cafoscarina. ISBN 9788875432867.
- Bruder, E. (2011). "Identites Juives contemporaines en Afrique de l'Ouest: une conséquence des routes caravanières au Moyen Age?". Graeco-Arabica. 11. Heraklion: Institut for Graeco-Oriental and African Studies.
- Bruder, E. (2013). "'The Descendants of David' of Madagascar: Crypto-Judaism in Twentieth Century Africa". In Sicher, Efraim (ed.). Race, Color, Identity: Rethinking Discourses about "Jews" in the 21st Century. Berghahn Books.
