= Wentworth Arthur Matthew =

Founder of the Commandment Keepers of the Living God

- Rabbi Wentworth Arthur Matthew holding a Torah scroll.
- Born: Wentworth Arthur Matthew; June 23, 1892; Spooner's Village, St. Kitts, Saint Kitts and Nevis
- Died: December 1973 (aged 81)
- Education: Spertus Institute for Jewish Learning and Leadership (BA, MS)
- Occupations: Religious leader
- Organization: Commandment Keepers
- Movement: Black Hebrew Israelites
- Spouse: Florence Matthew
- Children: 4

Wentworth Arthur Matthew (June 23, 1892 – December 1973) was a Kittitian-American religious leader who founded the Commandment Keepers of the Living God, a Black Hebrew congregation, in 1919. It was influenced by the pan-Africanism and black nationalism of Marcus Garvey from Jamaica. Matthew developed his congregation along Jewish lines of observance and the theory that they were returning to Judaism as the true Hebrews. He incorporated in 1930 and moved the congregation to Brooklyn. There he founded the Israelite Rabbinical Academy, teaching and ordaining African-American rabbis. His belief that Black people are descended from ancient Israelites is not widely accepted by the greater Jewish community.

According to Matthew, he was born in Lagos, Nigeria. Other sources, including his own records, say he was born in St. Kitts, British West Indies. He and his family became naturalized United States citizens.

== Early life and education ==
Wentworth Arthur Matthew was born in 1892 on Saint Kitts, British West Indies. He married his wife Florence (August 29, 1893—July 1980), who was also from the British West Indies. They had at least four children together, recorded as follows in their 1927 naturalization records in the United States:

- Arthur (July 12, 1917 —June 1987)
- Florence, born March 25, 1920
- Samuel E. (February 20, 1923—June 1987)
- Joseph, born August 24, 1926

In later years, Matthew sometimes said that he came from Lagos, Nigeria. But, in his 1927 petition for naturalization, Matthew lists his place of birth as Spooner's Village, British West Indies. When he registered in 1942 with the Selective Service during World War II, he listed his place of birth as St. Christopher, British West Indies.

== Immigration to the United States ==
Matthew immigrated to New York City and arranged for his family to join him. In 1919, he founded the Commandment Keepers Congregation of the Living God in Harlem, a Black Hebrew movement. He was strongly influenced by the white Jews he had met. When he learned about the Beta Israel of Ethiopia, he began to identify with them. Matthew trained rabbis, who set up synagogues throughout the United States and the Caribbean. When interviewed, many of the older members of this community recall memories of their parents observing Jewish dietary laws, such as abstaining from pork or salting their meat.

Matthew and his congregation were also strongly influenced by the pan-African philosophy of Marcus Garvey from Jamaica, and his black nationalist organization, the Universal Negro Improvement Association. Rabbi Arnold Josiah Ford composed the UNIA's Universal Ethiopian Anthem and its hymnal. He also led the UNIA band and conducted its choir.

In his theory of Black Hebrews, Matthew believed that African Americans were of the original Jews, descended from the Lost Tribes. He thought that white or European Jews were the descendants of the Khazars and had kept and preserved Judaism. Black Hebrews talked of regaining or returning to Judaism. Conservative and Orthodox Jews did not agree with his theory and believed that people either had to be descended directly from Jewish mothers, or undergo recognized conversion under Jewish authorities to be considered Jews. Matthew eventually concluded Black Jews, or Black Hebrews as in his congregations, would not be accepted by the white Jewish community.

Matthew's congregation followed traditional Jewish law with selective variations. Men and women were seated separately, standard Orthodox Jewish prayer books were used, and the laws concerning Shabbat and kashrut were observed. Matthew incorporated his congregation in 1930, and it eventually moved to Brooklyn. There he established the Israelite Rabbinical Academy, where he taught and ordained rabbis in his movement.

Wentworth Matthew's teachings are followed today by many Black Hebrews and Black Hebrew Israelites, which have developed along different lines. The latter reject whites altogether. Matthew believed that black people who converted to Judaism were not converting, but rather "returning" to Judaism.

Matthew applied and was rejected twice to become a member of the New York Board of Rabbis, as he did not satisfy their rules of Jewish descent or conversion by recognized Orthodox or Conservative courts. They resisted his introducing African, Caribbean or African-American practices into Jewish worship. According to a 2002 article by Rabbi Sholomo Ben Levy, also a Black Hebrew, after Matthew's death in 1973, there was little connection between Black Jews and white congregations in New York and elsewhere.

== Legacy ==
Rabbis ordained from the Israelite Rabbinical Academy in Brooklyn have become spiritual leaders of Black Hebrews in numerous cities. For instance, Capers Funnye, Jr. of Chicago studied with and was ordained by Levi Ben Levy, the spiritual leader of the Hebrew Israelite movement in Brooklyn from the Commandment Keepers tradition. In 1985 Funnye started as an assistant rabbi at the Beth Shalom B'nai Zaken Ethiopian Hebrew Congregation in Chicago, which he now leads. It is the largest Black Jewish or Black Hebrew congregation in the US. He also underwent a conversion certified by a Conservative court of rabbis, and earned a Bachelor of Arts degree in Jewish Studies and Master of Science in Human Service Administration from the Spertus Institute of Jewish Studies in Chicago. He has worked for decades to build bridges with traditional Judaism. In 1995 he was one of three founders of the Alliance of Black Jews, together with Robin founders from Boston and California. They sought to build bridges among all types of African-American Jews. It is no longer operating.

Shais Rishon, a Black Orthodox Jewish writer and activist, has claimed that Matthew was "a non-Jew who never belonged nor converted to any branch of Judaism."
