= Robin Washington =

American journalist and filmmaker (born 1956)

Robin Washington is an American journalist and filmmaker, born in Chicago in 1956. As a journalist and editor, he was worked for newspapers in Boston and Duluth, Minnesota, as well as for NPR. He has made documentaries about the civil rights movement and the lives of African Americans in the United States.

In 1995 he was one of three founders of the National Conference of Black Jews, later called the Alliance of Black Jews. It was conceived to build bridges among all African-American Jews, who are affiliated with many different groups.

== Early life ==
Robin Washington is of mixed race, the son of an African-American father, Atlee Washington, and Jean Birkenstein Washington, who was Jewish and of European-American descent.

== Career ==
Washington's major work is the 1995 PBS documentary You Don't Have to Ride Jim Crow! It is a chronicle of the Journey of Reconciliation, the first Freedom Ride of whites and blacks traveling through the Upper South in 1947 to challenge segregation in the wake of the United States Supreme Court's 1946 ruling in Morgan v. Virginia. It ruled that segregation of interstate transportation was unconstitutional under the Commerce Clause of the U.S. Constitution.

Washington previously produced the documentary Vermont: The Whitest State in the Union, about African Americans in that state.

From 1993 to 1996, he was managing editor of the African-American weekly Bay State Banner in Boston. From 1996 to 2004 he worked at the Boston Herald, where he wrote a consumer and transportation column. He also covered the Roman Catholic Church sex abuse scandal unfolding in that region and elsewhere. He frequently spoke as a guest on this topic on national television news shows.

In 2004, Washington became editorial page editor of Minnesota's Duluth News Tribune. He was promoted to editor in January 2010. He left the paper in February 2014.

In April 2021, Robin Washington became the Forward’s new Editor-at-Large, a flagship position aimed at elevating and expanding diverse voices.

He is also a radio commentator for National Public Radio, and has been a writer, editor, and publisher for several publications.

== Miscellaneous ==
Washington is a co-founder, with Michelle Stein-Evers and Rabbi Capers C. Funnye Jr., of the National Conference of Black Jews, which formed in 1995.
