= Commandment Keepers =

Sect of Black Hebrews

The Commandment Keepers Ethiopian Hebrew Congregation of the Living God Pillar & Ground of Truth, Inc. are a group of Black Hebrews, who believe that people of Ethiopian descent represent one of the lost tribes of Israel. They claim King Solomon and the Queen of Sheba as their ancestors, and believe the biblical patriarchs were black. They originated in Harlem, New York City, in 1919.

Most of its members are Afro-Caribbean but since its founding it has had diverse visitors, and occasionally white members. They use the De Sola Pool Spanish and Portuguese prayerbook, the Hertz Chumash, parchment Torah scrolls, and offer standard orthodox Sephardi style Sabbath and Jewish Holy Day services.

== History ==
Rabbi Wentworth Arthur Matthew holding a Torah scroll.

Rabbi Wentworth Arthur Matthew created the Commandment Keepers Church of the Living God the Pillar and Ground of Truth and the Faith of Jesus Christ in 1919, with members largely self-identifying as Afro-Caribbean and African American.

Originally a Christian church, the Commandment Keepers, led by Matthew, increasingly deemphasized Jesus Christ's value and accepted Orthodox Jewish practises. As a result of these doctrinal developments, the group's name was changed to Commandment Keepers Ethiopian Hebrew Congregation of the Living God Pillar & Ground of Truth. The Anti-Defamation League notes that while some other Black Hebrew organizations are antisemitic or racist, Matthew refrained from antisemitic or racist teachings, and advocated for kindness between his followers and white Jews.

In 1962 the mother congregation of the movement purchased the historic John Dwight house at 1 West 123rd Street/31 Mount Morris Park West Harlem, New York City.

The congregation is featured in a scene from the 1970 motion picture The Angel Levine which starred Harry Belafonte and Zero Mostel.

On June 12, 1971, Rabbi W.A. Matthew ordained three individuals as rabbis, his grandson Rabbi David Matthew Doré, Rabbi Jonah McCullough, and Rabbi Willie White.

In 1973, Matthew died, creating an internal conflict over who would be the new leader. David Matthew Doré, who was 18 years old at the time, was named by Rabbi Matthew as spiritual leader of the congregation just before Matthew's death. In 1975, the board of the congregation elected Willie White to be the new leader and without congregational approval shortened its name to Commandment Keepers Congregation.

Doré continued to host services at the synagogue until the early 1980s, when White began locking people out. Doré at this time was working as a lawyer, but states that he often tried to enter the synagogue. Throughout the 1990s membership was declining. In 2004, Zechariah ben Lewi became the rabbi for the Commandment Keepers, and membership had dropped to eight people, with over two hundred actual members locked out of the temple.

A lawsuit was filed against Doré that year for wrongfully claiming himself to be the spiritual leader of the congregation. The court ruled against Doré. The ruling was overturned on July 9, 2007. The board proceeded to sell the building at 1 West 123rd Street. Doré, as attorney for Commandment Keepers Ethiopian Hebrew Congregation of the Living God Pillar and Ground of Truth, Inc., filed a lawsuit against the board for selling the historic landmark, and in October 2007 a court vacated the sale and ordered a trial.

As of 2011, Doré's suit against the buyer and the individual who claimed authority to sell the historic landmark was pending. The named defendants submitted motions to dismiss the action, Doré, as counsel for the congregation, filed opposition papers and both motions were denied. Defendants then appealed to the Appellate Division First Department. After oral argument the Appellate Division, in a unanimous decision issued June 4, 2013, denied defendants appeal to dismiss the case and affirmed the ruling of the lower court that denied defendants motion to dismiss. The case was on the trial calendar for April 2, 2014 before Justice Richard F. Braun.

The Dwight house is now owned by poet James Fenton and his partner Darryl Pinckney who purchased it in 2010 from a development company.

As of 2014 Black Jews influenced by the Commandment Keepers continue to practice at Mt. Horeb Congregation in the Bronx, Beth Shalom in Bedstuyvesant in Brooklyn, B'nai Adat in Brooklyn, and Beth Elohim in Queens; and as of 2009 at B'nai Zaken in Chicago. In 2014 they compiled their first siddur, a Jewish prayer book, prepared specifically for Black Jews.

According to a 2014 piece in Tablet magazine, the practices of the Commandment Keepers have gradually become more orthodox in observance over time, and there is diversity in the traditions of individual temples.

== Bibliography ==
- Article on Black Jewish community, jewishvirtuallibrary.org
- Synagogue profile at nyc-architecture.com
- Congregation description at film website
- New York Post article on congregation.
