= Black Hebrew Israelites =

African American new religious movement

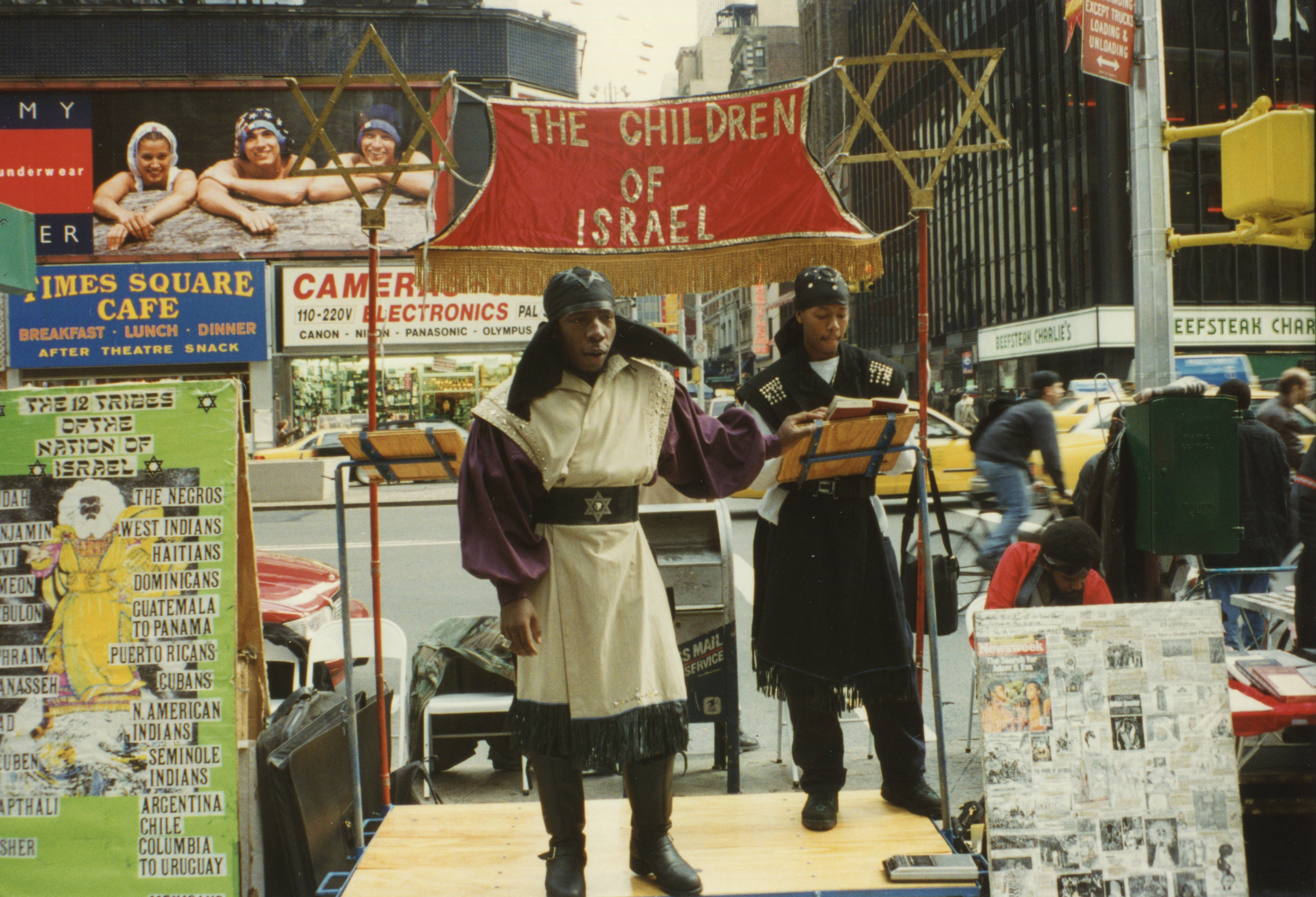
Black Hebrew Israelites proselytizing in New York City, 1995

Black Hebrew Israelites (also called Hebrew Israelites, Black Hebrews, Black Israelites, and African Hebrew Israelites) are a new religious movement claiming that African Americans are descendants of the ancient Israelites. Some sub-groups believe that indigenous peoples of the Americas and Latin Americans are descendants of the Israelites, as well. Their teachings draw on a wide range of sources. They incorporate their own interpretations of Christianity and Judaism, and their beliefs are also influenced by Freemasonry and New Thought. Black Hebrew Israelism is a non-homogenous movement composed of numerous groups with varying beliefs and practices. Many choose to identify as Hebrew Israelites or Black Hebrews rather than as Jews.

Black Hebrew Israelites are a distinct group that is not affiliated with the mainstream Jewish community or normative Judaism, as they do not meet the established criteria—such as matrilineal descent or formal conversion—that are used to identify someone as Jewish. Additionally, they operate outside the doctrinal and organizational boundaries of Nicene Christianity, which forms the core of mainstream Christian denominations.

The Black Hebrew Israelite movement originated at the end of the 19th century, when Frank Cherry and William Saunders Crowdy claimed to have received visions that African Americans are descendants of the Hebrews in the Hebrew Bible. Cherry established the Church of the Living God, the Pillar Ground of Truth for All Nations, in 1886, and Crowdy founded the Church of God and Saints of Christ in 1896. Subsequently, Black Hebrew groups were founded in the United States during the late 19th and early 20th centuries, from Kansas to New York City, by both African Americans and West Indian immigrants. In the mid-1980s, the number of Black Hebrews in the United States was between 25,000 and 40,000.

Academics have criticized various sects of Black Hebrew Israelism for their theology and historical revisionism due to the lack of evidence supporting their claims. Some sects are considered black supremacist and antisemitic. According to the Anti-Defamation League (ADL): "Some, but not all, [Black Hebrew Israelites] are outspoken anti-Semites and racists." The Southern Poverty Law Center designates several extremist sects as hate groups that support racial segregation, Holocaust denial, homophobia, and race war. The SPLC refers to these extremist groups as "Radical Hebrew Israelites" to distinguish between "extremist and non-extremist sects" and because not all Hebrew Israelites are black.

== History ==
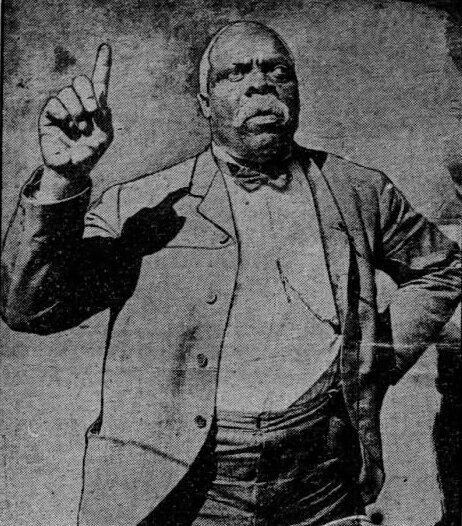
A photograph of William Saunders Crowdy which appeared in a 1907 edition of The Baltimore Sun

The origins of the Black Hebrew Israelite movement are found in Frank Cherry and William Saunders Crowdy, who both claimed that they had revelations in which they believed that God told them that African Americans are descendants of the Hebrews in the Christian Bible; Cherry established the "Church of the Living God, the Pillar Ground of Truth for All Nations" in 1886, and Crowdy founded the "Church of God and Saints of Christ" in 1896. Cherry taught that the Talmud was authoritative, that Jesus would return in the year AD 2000, and in a "square earth surrounded by three layers of heaven." The playing of the piano and the collection of tithes during Black Hebrew Israelite worship was forbidden by Cherry, who also taught the eastward direction of prayer and "denigrated white Jews as interlopers." The Church of God and Saints of Christ, originating in Kansas, retained elements of a messianic connection to Jesus. Another early key figure was William Christian. The pioneers of the movement were Freemasons, and it was strongly influenced by Masonic traditions. In the late 19th century, Cherry's and Crowdy's followers continued to propagate the claim that they were the biological descendants of the Israelites. During the following decades, many more Black Hebrew congregations were established. Similar groups selected elements of Judaism and adapted them within a structure similar to that of the Black church. After Frank Cherry's death in 1963, his son Prince Benjamin F. Cherry took over leadership of the movement.

== Groups ==
During the late 19th and early 20th centuries, dozens of Black Hebrew organizations were established. In Harlem alone, at least eight such groups were founded between 1919 and 1931.

Some of these include:

- The Church of the Living God, the Pillar Ground of Truth for All Nations is the oldest known Black Hebrew group.
- The Church of God and Saints of Christ is one of the largest Black Hebrew organizations.
- The Commandment Keepers, founded by Wentworth Arthur Matthew in New York, are noted for their adherence to traditional Judaism.
- The African Hebrew Israelites in Israel are widely known for having moved from the United States (primarily Chicago) to Israel in the late 20th century.
- The Israelite School of Universal Practical Knowledge, based in Philadelphia.
- The Nation of Yahweh, based in Miami, whose founding members have been accused of violent behavior, including the murder of apostatizing members in 2007.

=== Church of the Living God, the Pillar Ground of Truth for All Nations ===
The oldest known Black Hebrew organization is the Church of the Living God, the Pillar Ground of Truth for All Nations. The group was founded by Frank Cherry in Chattanooga, Tennessee, in 1886, and it later moved to Philadelphia. Cherry, who was from the Deep South and had worked as a seaman and for the railroads before his ministry, taught himself Hebrew and Yiddish. Theologically, the Church of the Living God mixed elements of Judaism and Christianity, counting the Christian Bible—including the New Testament—and the Talmud as essential scriptures.

The rituals of Cherry's congregation incorporated many Jewish practices and prohibitions alongside some Christian traditions. For example, during prayer, the men wore skullcaps and congregants faced east. In addition, members of the church were not permitted to eat pork. Prayers were accompanied by musical instruments and gospel singing. Cherry died in 1963 when he was about 95 years old; his son, Prince Benjamin F. Cherry, succeeded him. Members of the church believed that he had temporarily left and would soon reappear in spirit in order to lead the church through his son.

=== Church of God and Saints of Christ ===
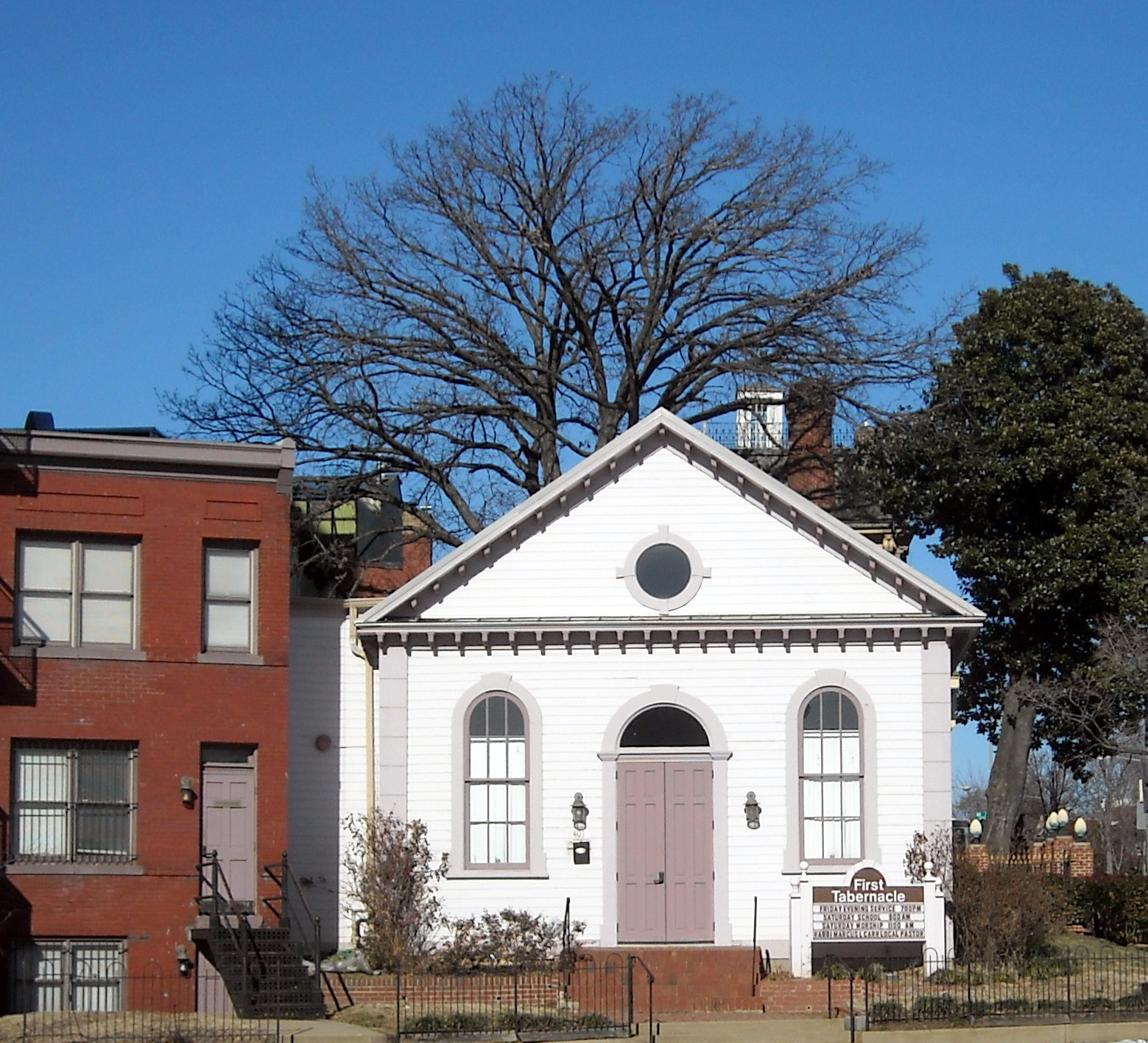
The former headquarters of the Church of God and Saints of Christ in Washington, D.C. The building is now known as First Tabernacle Beth El and it is listed on the National Register of Historic Places.

The Church of God and Saints of Christ was established in Lawrence, Kansas, in 1896 by African American William Saunders Crowdy. The group established its headquarters in Philadelphia in 1899; Crowdy later relocated to Washington, D.C., in 1903. After Crowdy's death in 1908, the church continued to grow under the leadership of William Henry Plummer, who moved the organization's headquarters to its permanent location in Belleville, Virginia, in 1921.

In 1936, the Church of God and Saints of Christ had more than 200 "tabernacles" (congregations) and 37,000 members. Howard Z. Plummer succeeded his father and became head of the organization in 1931. His son, Levi Solomon Plummer, became the church's leader in 1975. The Church of God and Saints of Christ was led by Jehu A. Crowdy Jr., a great-grandson of William Saunders Crowdy, from 2001 until his death in 2016. Since 2016, it has been led by Phillip E. McNeil. As of 2005, the church had fifty tabernacles in the United States and dozens more in Africa.

The Church of God and Saints of Christ describes itself as "the oldest African-American congregation in the United States that adheres to the tenets of Judaism." The church teaches that all Jews were originally Black and that African Americans are descendants of the Ten Lost Tribes. Members believe that Jesus was neither God nor the son of God, but rather an adherent of Judaism and a prophet. They also consider William Saunders Crowdy, their founder, to be a prophet.

The Church of God and Saints of Christ synthesizes rituals from both normative Judaism and Christianity. They have adopted rites drawn from both the Old and New Testaments. Its Old Testament observances include the use of the Hebrew calendar, the celebration of Passover, the circumcision of infant males, the commemoration of the Sabbath on Saturday, and the wearing of yarmulkes. Its New Testament rites include baptism (immersion) and footwashing, both of which have Old Testament origins.

=== Commandment Keepers ===
The founder of the Commandment Keepers, Wentworth Arthur Matthew holding a Sefer Torah.

In 1919, Wentworth Arthur Matthew, an emigrant from Saint Kitts, founded a Black Hebrew Israelite congregation in Harlem, the Commandment Keepers of the Living God. In 1930, Matthew established the Ethiopian Hebrew Rabbinical College (later renamed the Israelite Rabbinical Academy) in Brooklyn. He ordained more than 20 rabbis, who went on to lead congregations throughout the United States and the Caribbean. He remained the leader of the Commandment Keepers in Harlem, and in 1962 the congregation moved to a landmark building on 123rd Street.

Matthew died in 1973, sparking an internal conflict over who would succeed him as head of the Harlem congregation. Shortly before his death, Matthew named his grandson, David Matthew Doré, as the new spiritual leader. Doré was 16 years old at the time. In 1975, the synagogue's board elected Rabbi Willie White as its leader. Rabbi Doré occasionally conducted services at the synagogue until the early 1980s, when White had Doré and some other members locked out of the building. Membership declined throughout the 1990s, and by 2004, only a few dozen people belonged to the synagogue. In 2007 the Commandment Keepers sold the building while various factions among former members sued one another.

Matthew was influenced by the non-black Jews he met as well as by Marcus Garvey and the Universal Negro Improvement Association and African Communities League. Garvey used the Biblical Jews in exile as a metaphor for black people in North America. One of the accomplishments of Garvey's movement was to strengthen the connection between black Americans and Africa, Ethiopia in particular. When Matthew later learned about the Beta Israel—Ethiopian Jews—he identified with them, teaching that the Commandment Keepers were descendants of Solomon and the Queen of Sheba. Matthew taught that "the Black man is a Jew" and "all genuine Jews are Black men", but he valued non-black Jews as those who had preserved Judaism over the centuries. Matthew maintained cordial ties with non-black Jewish leaders in New York and frequently invited them to worship at his synagogue.

Today, the Commandment Keepers follow traditional Jewish practices and observe Jewish holidays. Members observe kashrut, circumcise newborn boys, and celebrate Bar and Bat Mitzvahs, and their synagogue has a mechitza to separate men and women during worship.

Besides the Harlem group, there are eight or ten Commandment Keeper congregations in the New York area, and others exist throughout North America as well as in Israel. Since 2000, seven rabbis have graduated from the Israelite Rabbinical Academy founded by Matthew.

=== African Hebrew Israelites in Israel ===
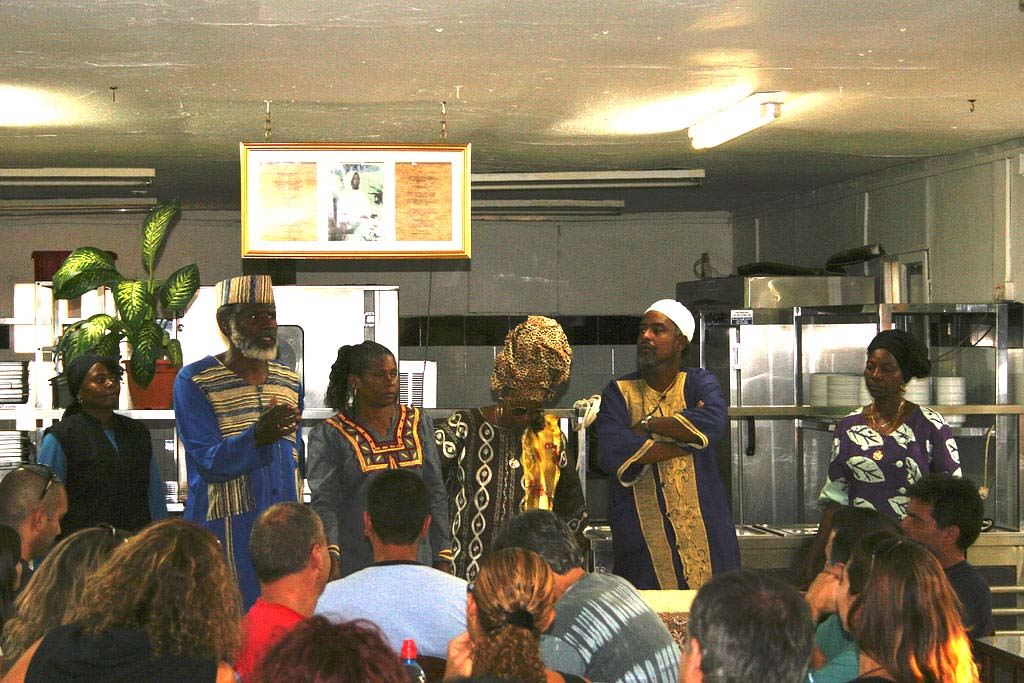
African Hebrew Israelites speak to visitors in Dimona, Israel.

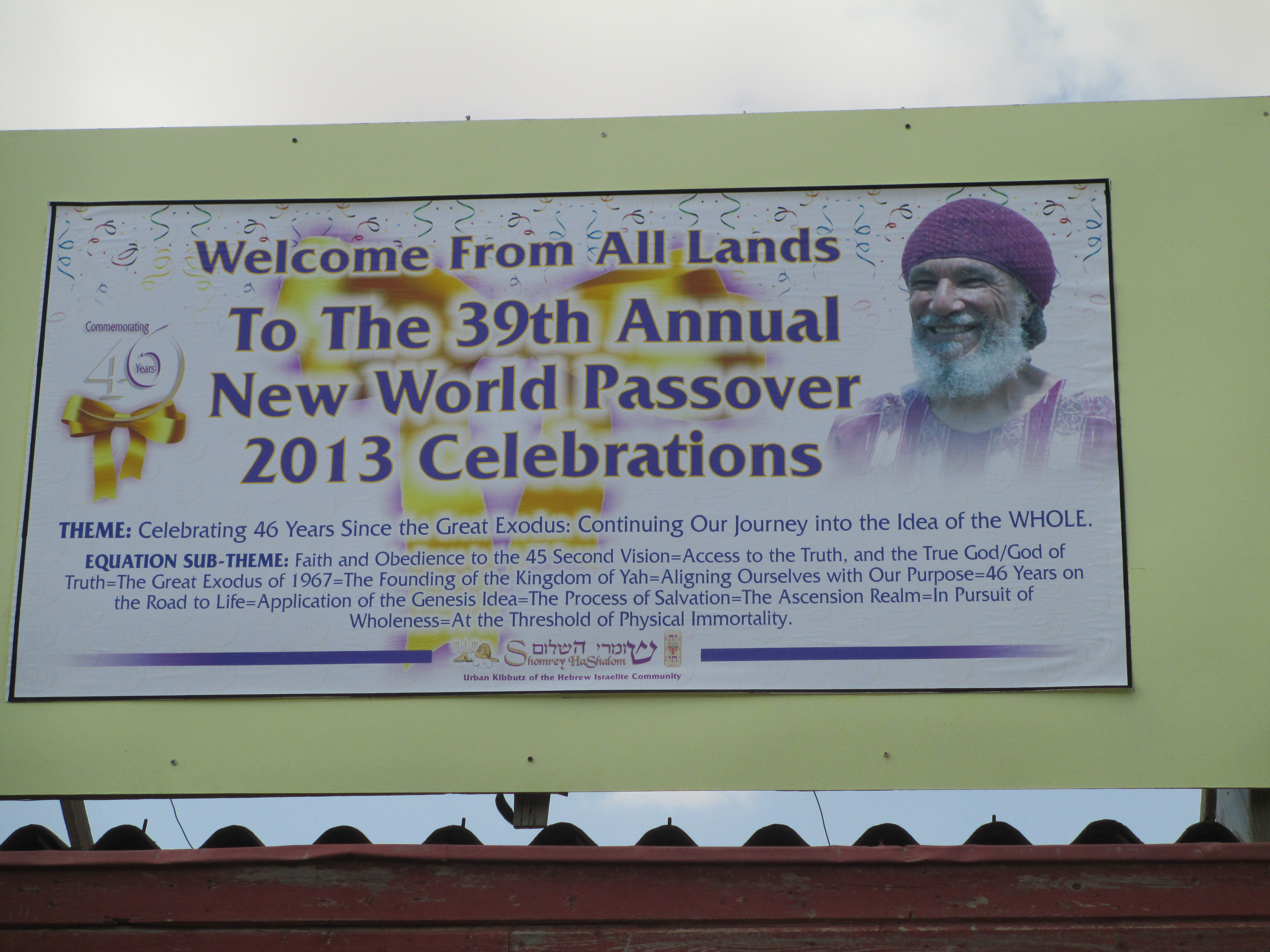
A sign in Dimona.

Ben Ammi Ben-Israel established the African Hebrew Israelites of Jerusalem in Chicago, Illinois, in 1966, a time when black nationalism was on the rise as a response to the civil rights movement. In 1969, after a sojourn in Liberia, Ben Ammi and around 30 Hebrew Israelites moved to Israel. Over the next 20 years, nearly 600 more members left the United States for Israel. As of 2006, about 2,500 Hebrew Israelites live in Dimona and two other towns in the Negev region of Israel, where they are widely referred to as Black Hebrews. In addition, there are African Hebrew Israelite communities in several major American cities, including Chicago, St. Louis, and Washington, D.C.

The Black Hebrews believe they are descended from members of the Tribe of Judah who were exiled from the Land of Israel after the Romans destroyed the Second Temple in 70 CE. The group incorporates elements of African-American culture into their interpretation of the Bible. They do not recognize rabbinical Jewish interpretations such as the Talmud. The Black Hebrews observe Shabbat and biblically ordained Jewish holidays such as Yom Kippur and Passover. Men wear tzitzit on their African print shirts, women follow the niddah (biblical laws concerning menstruation), and newborn boys are circumcised. In accordance with their interpretation of the Bible, the Black Hebrews follow a strictly vegan diet and only wear natural fabrics. Most men have more than one wife, and birth control is not permitted.

When the first Black Hebrews arrived in Israel in 1969, they claimed citizenship under the Law of Return, which gives eligible Jews immediate citizenship. The Israeli government ruled in 1973 that the group did not qualify for automatic citizenship because they could not prove Jewish descent and had not undergone Orthodox conversion. The Black Hebrews were denied work permits and state benefits. The group accused the Israeli government of racist discrimination. In 1981, a group of American civil rights activists led by Bayard Rustin investigated and concluded that racism was not the cause of the Black Hebrews' situation. No official action was taken to return the Black Hebrews to the United States, but some individual members were deported for working illegally.

Some Black Hebrews renounced their American citizenship in order to try to prevent more deportations. In 1990, Illinois legislators helped negotiate an agreement that resolved the Black Hebrews' legal status in Israel. Members of the group are permitted to work and have access to housing and social services. The Black Hebrews reclaimed their American citizenship and have received aid from the U.S. government, which helped them build a school and additional housing. In 2003, the agreement was revised, and the Black Hebrews were granted permanent residency in Israel. In 2009, Elyakim Ben-Israel became the first Black Hebrew to gain Israeli citizenship. The Israeli government said that more Black Hebrews may be granted citizenship.

Today, young men and some women from the African Hebrew community of Jerusalem serve in the IDF; they have entered international sporting events and academic competitions under the Israeli flag and have represented Israel twice in the Eurovision Song Contest. The Black Hebrews of Israel maintain a popular gospel choir that tours throughout Israel and the United States. The group owns restaurants in several Israeli cities. In 2003, the Black Hebrews garnered public attention when singer Whitney Houston visited them in Dimona. In 2006, Eddie Butler, a Black Hebrew, was chosen by the Israeli public to represent Israel in the Eurovision Song Contest.

=== One West Camp and splinter groups ===
The One West Camp is a messianic subdivision of Black Hebrew Israelite groups that believe in the Old Testament, the New Testament and the exclusive identification of the Twelve Tribes of Israel with ethnic communities of Black, Latin American, and Native American descent in the Americas. The camp is named after its first grouping, which was located at One West 125th Street in Harlem, New York City, then known as the 'Israeli School of Universal Practical Knowledge'. The movement has since splintered into numerous "camps", including the Israelite Church of God in Jesus Christ and the Israelite School of Universal Practical Knowledge. Other notable groups descended from the One West Camp include the Gathering of Christ Church, Masharah Yasharahla, and Israel United in Christ.

== Extremist fringe ==
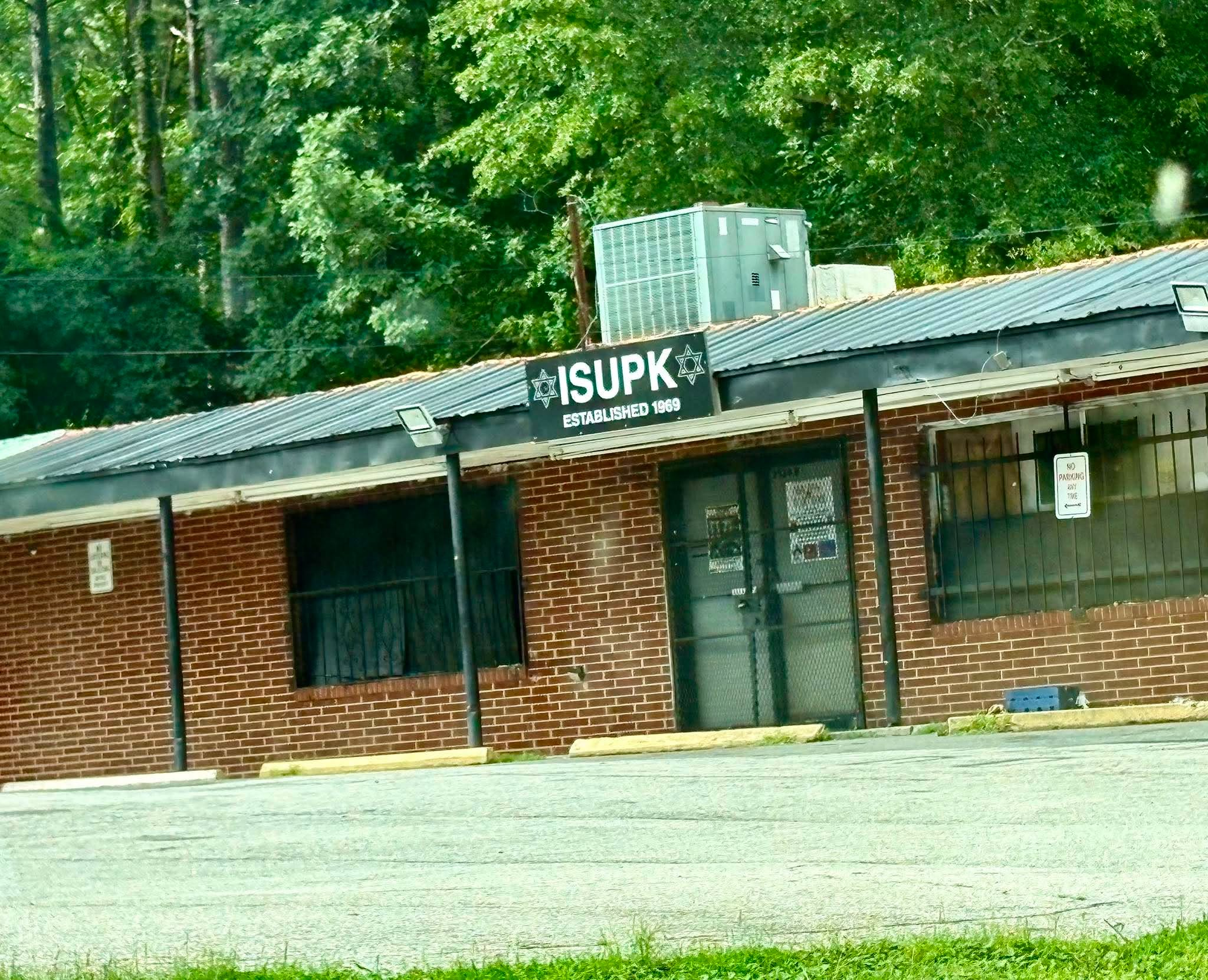
The ISUPK in Durham, North Carolina

A 1999 FBI terrorism risk assessment report stated that "violent radical fringe members" of the Black Hebrew Israelite movement hold "beliefs [that] bear a striking resemblance to the Christian Identity theology practiced by many white supremacists". The 1999 assessment concluded that "the overwhelming majority of [Black Hebrew Israelites] are unlikely to engage in violence."

In late 2008, the Southern Poverty Law Center (SPLC) wrote that "the extremist fringe of the Hebrew Israelite movement" has a Black supremacist outlook. It wrote that the members of such groups "believe that Jews are devilish impostors and ... openly condemn Whites as evil personified, deserving only death or slavery". The SPLC wrote that "most Hebrew Israelites are neither explicitly racist nor anti-Semitic and do not advocate violence".

As of December 2019, the Southern Poverty Law Center "lists 144 Black Hebrew Israelite organizations as black separatist hate groups because of their antisemitic and anti-white beliefs". The groups the SPLC has categorized as Black supremacist hate groups include the Israelite School of Universal Practical Knowledge (ISUPK), and the Nation of Yahweh (NOY).

The Anti-Defamation League has written that the 12 Tribes of Israel website, which is maintained by a Black Hebrew group, promotes Black supremacy. The ADL has also described several extremist BHI sects as hate groups, including the House of Israel (HOI), the Israelites Saints of Christ, the True Nation Israelite Congregation, and the Israelite Church of God in Jesus Christ (ICGJC). The ADL summarized some of the commonly used BHI terms:

- Jew-ish: Negative term for depicting Jews as "imposters"
- So-called Jews: Casting doubt on the Jewish identity of mainstream Jews
- Synagogue of Satan: An ancient slur borrowed to express dislike of Jews

Some sects of the Black Hebrew Israelite movement employ street preaching to promote their ideology. Sidewalk ministers may employ provocation to advance a message that is often antisemitic, racist, and xenophobic. In January 2019, street preachers purportedly targeted students of Covington Catholic High School (Kentucky) at a confrontation at Lincoln Memorial. One student reported that extremist Black Hebrew Israelites called students slurs, and told an African American student that white classmates would "harvest his organs".

=== Attacks ===
Alberta Williams King, the mother of Martin Luther King Jr., was shot and killed on June 30, 1974, at age 69, by Marcus Wayne Chenault, a 23-year-old Black man from Ohio, who had adopted the theology of a Black Hebrew Israelite preacher, Hananiah E. Israel of Cincinnati, and had shown interest in a group called the "Hebrew Pentecostal Church of the Living God". Israel, Chenault's mentor, castigated Black civil rights activists and Black church leaders as being evil and deceptive, but claimed in interviews not to have advocated violence. Chenault did not draw any such distinction, and first decided to assassinate Rev. Jesse Jackson in Chicago, but canceled the plan at the last minute.

On December 10, 2019, two people who had expressed interest in the Black Hebrew Israelite movement were killed in a shootout with police. They had killed a police detective at Bayview Cemetery, and three people at the JC Kosher Supermarket in Jersey City, New Jersey: the Jewish co-owner of the grocery store, an employee, and a Jewish shopper. Authorities treated the incident as an act of domestic terrorism. Capers Funnye, who had been the rabbi for 26 years of the 200-member Beth Shalom B'nai Zaken Ethiopian Hebrew Congregation, condemned the attack and said that his community was "gripped by sadness" over "the heinous actions of two disturbed individuals who cloaked themselves in anti-Semitism and hate-filled rhetoric". He criticized the media reports for using "the term 'Black Hebrew Israelites' without distinction as if the description is a one size fits all and it is absolutely not". Funnye said: "we don't want to be seen as some radical fringe group with a false narrative because we are black and profess Judaism; we are Torah-oriented Jews."

On December 28, 2019, a man with a machete attacked several Orthodox Jewish people during Hanukkah celebrations in a house in Monsey, New York. Authorities revealed that his journals included references to Black Hebrew Israelites, stating that "Hebrew Israelites" have taken from "ebinoid Israelites".

== Responses ==
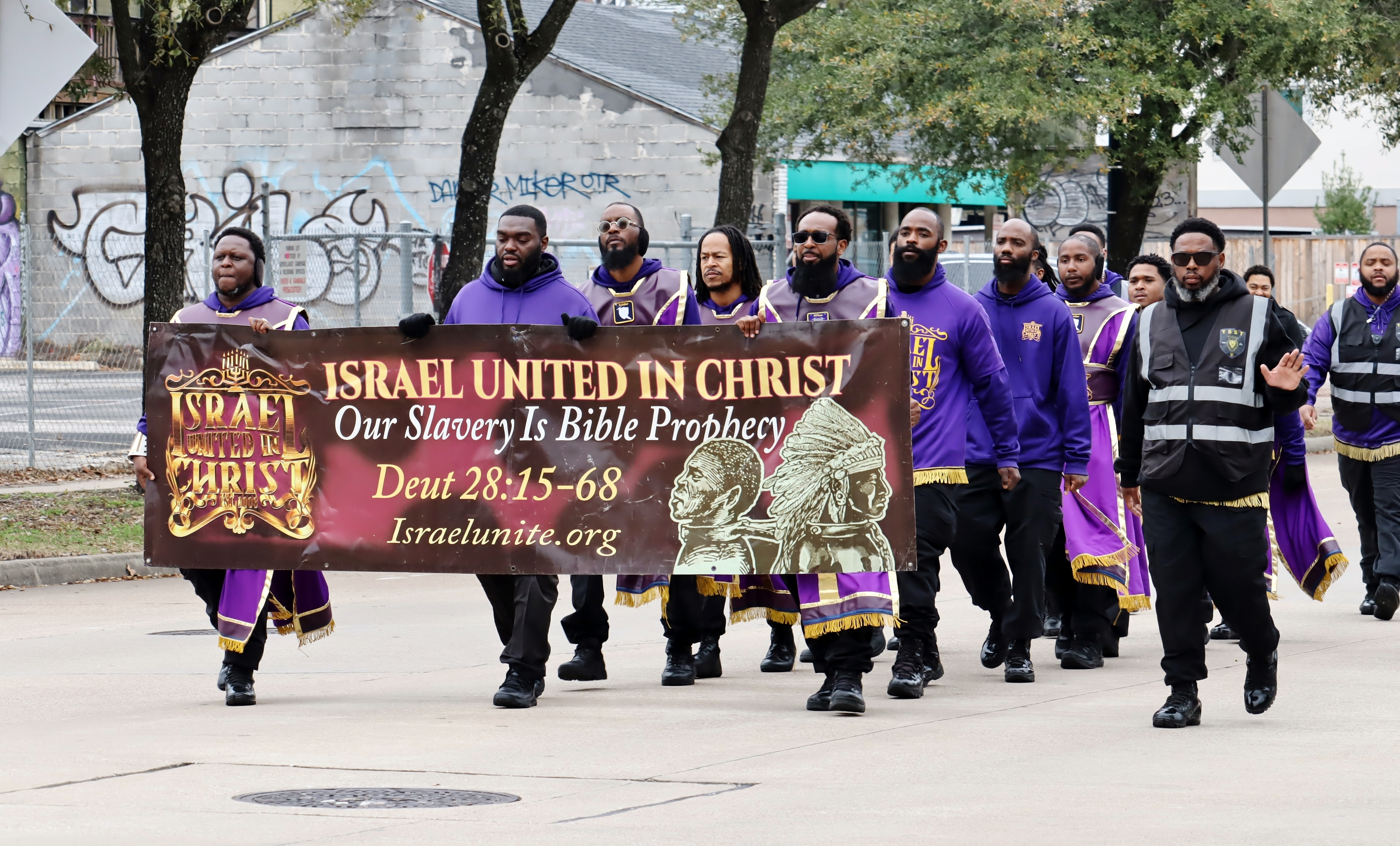
Hebrew Israelites marching in Houston, 2024

African American Christian apologetics organizations, such as the Jude 3 Project, have critiqued the theological and historical claims which have been presented by various Black Hebrew Israelite sects. Zimbabwean novelist Masimba Musodza says the Black Hebrew Israelites have made historical revisionist claims and that their doctrine "force[s] their own ideas onto the text to promote their own agenda", engendering "antisemitism in Black communities in western countries". (Note: Musodza says that historical accounts by historian Josephus and theologians Emil Schürer and Friedrich Münter, who wrote of Jewish slaves sold to work in Egypt and the Roman Empire, contradict the Black Hebrew Israelites' claim that Egypt is a metaphor for the Americas. He also says the Black Hebrew Israelites suggest there was a Kingdom of Judah in West Africa, although the historic Middle Eastern state has no connection with the Kingdom of Whydah, and that Black Hebrew Israelites do not acknowledge the poverty that Jews experienced as immigrants in the United States.)

Fran Markowitz, a professor of Cultural Anthropology at the Ben-Gurion University of the Negev, writes that the Hebrew Israelite view of the transatlantic slave trade conflicts with historical accounts, as does the Hebrew Israelite belief that Socrates and William Shakespeare were black.

The Anti-Defamation League and Southern Poverty Law Center have designated some extremist sects of Black Hebrew Israelites as hate groups. The ADL said "Some, but not all, [Black Hebrew Israelites] are outspoken anti-Semites and racists".

Shais Rishon, a Black Orthodox Jewish writer and activist, objects to the common conflation of Black Hebrew Israelites and Black Jews, which he says amounts to erasure of the "mainstream normative Black Jewish community". He says that Black Hebrew Israelites are not a denomination of Judaism, and that Black Hebrew Israelites do not share the same identity, community, or issues as Black Jews.

== See also ==
- African American–Jewish relations
- Afro-American religion
- Black Judaism
- Cultural appropriation
- Groups claiming affiliation with Israelites
  - British Israelism
  - Christian Identity
  - French Israelism
  - Nordic Israelism
- Hoteps
- Messianic Judaism
- Moorish Science Temple of America
- New religious movement
- Pretendian
- Religion in Black America

== Sources ==
- Ben-Jochannan, Yosef A.A. (1993) [1983]. We, the Black Jews: Witness to the "White Jewish Race" Myth. Baltimore: Black Classic Press. ISBN 0-933121-40-7.
- Bruder, Edith; Parfitt, Tudor (2012). "Introduction". In Edith Bruder; Tudor Parfitt (eds.). African Zion: Studies in Black Judaism. Newcastle upon Tyne: Cambridge Scholars Publishing. ISBN 978-1-4438-3802-3. Archived from the original on December 26, 2016.
- Chireau, Yvonne (2000). "Black Culture and Black Zion: African American Religious Encounters with Judaism, 1790–1930, an Overview". In Yvonne Patricia Chireau; Nathaniel Deutsch (eds.). Black Zion: African American Religious Encounters with Judaism. New York: Oxford University Press. ISBN 0-19-511257-1.
- Dorman, Jacob S. (2006). "Black Israelites". In Gallagher, Eugene V.; Ashcraft, W. Michael (eds.). Jewish and Christian Traditions. Introduction to New and Alternative Religions in America, 2. Westport, Conn: Greenwood Pub. ISBN 978-0-275-98714-5. LCCN 2006022954. OCLC 315689134.
- Fauset, Arthur Huff (2002) [1944]. Black Gods of the Metropolis: Negro Religious Cults of the Urban North. Philadelphia: University of Pennsylvania Press. ISBN 0-8122-1001-8.
- Gallagher, Eugene V. (2004). The New Religious Movements Experience in America. Westport, Conn.: Greenwood Press. ISBN 0-313-32807-2.
- Goldschmidt, Henry (2006). Race and Religion Among the Chosen Peoples of Crown Heights. New Brunswick, N.J.: Rutgers University Press. ISBN 0-8135-3897-1.
- Greene, Lorenzo Johnston (1996). Arvarh E. Strickland (ed.). Selling Black History for Carter G. Woodson: A Diary, 1930–1933. Columbia: University of Missouri Press. ISBN 0-8262-1068-6.
- Isaac, Walter (2006). "Locating African-American Judaism: A Critique of White Normativity". In Lewis R. Gordon; Jane Anna Gordon (eds.). A Companion to African-American Studies. Malden, Mass.: Blackwell Publishing. ISBN 0-631-23516-7.
- Kidd, Colin (2006). The Forging of Races: Race and Scripture in the Protestant Atlantic World, 1600-2000. Cambridge: Cambridge University Press. ISBN 0-521-79324-6.
- Landing, James E. (2002). Black Judaism: Story of an American Movement. Durham, N.C.: Carolina Academic Press. ISBN 0-89089-820-0.
- Michaeli, Ethan (2000). "Another Exodus: The Hebrew Israelites from Chicago to Dimona". In Yvonne Patricia Chireau; Nathaniel Deutsch (eds.). Black Zion: African American Religious Encounters with Judaism. New York: Oxford University Press. ISBN 0-19-511257-1.
- Moses, Wilson Jeremiah (2003). "Chosen Peoples of the Metropolis: Black Muslims, Black Jews, and Others". In Cornel West; Eddie S. Glaude Jr. (eds.). African American Religious Thought: An Anthology. Louisville, Ky.: Westminster John Knox Press. ISBN 0-664-22459-8.
- Parfitt, Tudor (2013). Black Jews in Africa and the Americas. Cambridge, Mass.: Harvard University Press. ISBN 978-0-674-07150-6.
- Parfitt, Tudor; Emanuela Trevisan Semi (2002). Judaising Movements: Studies in the Margins of Judaism in Modern Times. New York: Routledge. ISBN 0-7007-1515-0.
- Singer, Merrill (1992). "The Southern Origin of Black Judaism". In Baer, Hans A.; Jones, Yvonne (eds.). African Americans in the South: Issues of Race, Class, and Gender. Athens, Ga.: University of Georgia Press. ISBN 0-8203-1376-9.
- Singer, Merrill (2000). "Symbolic Identity Formation in an African American Religious Sect: The Black Hebrew Israelites". In Yvonne Patricia Chireau; Nathaniel Deutsch (eds.). Black Zion: African American Religious Encounters with Judaism. New York: Oxford University Press. ISBN 0-19-511257-1.
- Sundquist, Eric J. (2002). Strangers in the Land: Blacks, Jews, Post-Holocaust America. Cambridge, Mass.: Harvard University Press. ISBN 0-674-01942-3.
- Wolfson, Bernard J. (2000). "African American Jews: Dispelling Myths, Bridging the Divide". In Yvonne Patricia Chireau; Nathaniel Deutsch (eds.). Black Zion: African American Religious Encounters with Judaism. New York: Oxford University Press. ISBN 0-19-511257-1.
- Wynia, Elly M. (1994). The Church of God and Saints of Christ: The Rise of Black Jews. New York: Routledge. ISBN 0-8153-1136-2.
