= Shais Rishon =

African-American Orthodox rabbi, activist, and writer

MaNishtana
- Born: Shais Rishon; February 14, 1982 (age 44); Brooklyn, New York, U.S.
- Occupations: Blogger; author; speaker; activist
- Spouse: Gulienne Rollins-Rishon
- Children: 1
- Writing career
- Years active: 2009–present
- Notable works: MaNishtana blog Ariel Samson, Freelance Rabbi
- Website: manishtana.me

Shais Rishon, also known by the pen name MaNishtana, is an African-American Orthodox rabbi, activist, and writer. He has written for Tablet, Kveller, The Forward, Jewcy, and Hevria, as well as writing a semi-autobiographical novel under his pen name. In 2014, he was included in The Jewish Week's "36 Under 36", an annual list of influential Jews under age 36.

== Biography ==
Rishon was born February 14, 1982 in Brooklyn, New York to a Jewish African-American family associated with the Chabad-Lubavitch movement. According to him, his mother's ancestors have been practicing Jews since the 1780s. His father, Asher Rishon, converted to Judaism after meeting Shais' mother. Growing up, Shais felt alienated from the Jewish community due to his race and the treatment he received from other Jews. He attended James Madison High School and Brooklyn College, where he majored in English.

Rishon began blogging about his black and Jewish identities as MaNishtana in 2009. His writing focuses on racism within the Jewish community, and he has worked as a content manager for Bend The Arc, a progressive Jewish organization focused on social justice. He served as rabbi for Kehilat Ir Chadash, an Orthodox congregation in New City, New York.

In 2020, Rishon and rapper Yitz Jordan (Y-Love) announced plans to create a Jewish Community Center specifically for Jews of color. The community center would be open to all Jews, but focused on Jews of color, and would build bridges both within the Jewish community and between Jews of color and other minorities.

== Works ==
Rishon's debut novel, Ariel Samson, Freelance Rabbi, was a finalist for the 2018 National Jewish Book Award's Goldberg Award for Debut Fiction. He expressed hope that the semi-autobiographical novel would challenge stereotypes about Jews of color, and make a place for them in the larger Jewish community.

He has also contributed to the Kveller Haggadah. Rishon has also dabbled in playwrighting, contributing in 2017 to The Jewish Plays Project alongside playwrights Susan Bernfield, Sarah Gancher, and MJ Kaufman.

In 2013, Rishon wrote an open letter criticizing New York State Assemblyman Dov Hikind for wearing blackface at a Purim celebration.

== Personal life ==
Rishon was married to Gulienne Rollins-Rishon, a biracial Black Jew and a descendant of Rabbi Yom-Tov Lipman Heller. The couple have a daughter who was born in late 2013.

In June 2021, Rishon revealed publicly via Twitter that he was autistic and polyamorous.

== Bibliography ==
=== Books ===
- Thoughts From A Unicorn: 100% Black. 100% Jewish. 0% Safe. (2012, Hyphen Publishing)
- "Fine, thanks. How are you, Jewish?": A Stream-Of-Consciousness Stroll Through the Jew of Color Mind (2014)
- The Rishoni Illuminated Legacy Hagadah (2015)
- Ariel Samson: Freelance Rabbi (2018, Multikosheral Press)

=== Short stories ===
- 2014: "One Man’s Dystopia Is Another Man’s What?"
- 2014: "The (Space)Time Of Your Life"

=== Poems ===
- 2015: "Mashiach Now?"
