= Benjamin Prentiss =

American lawyer and military officer (1819–1901)

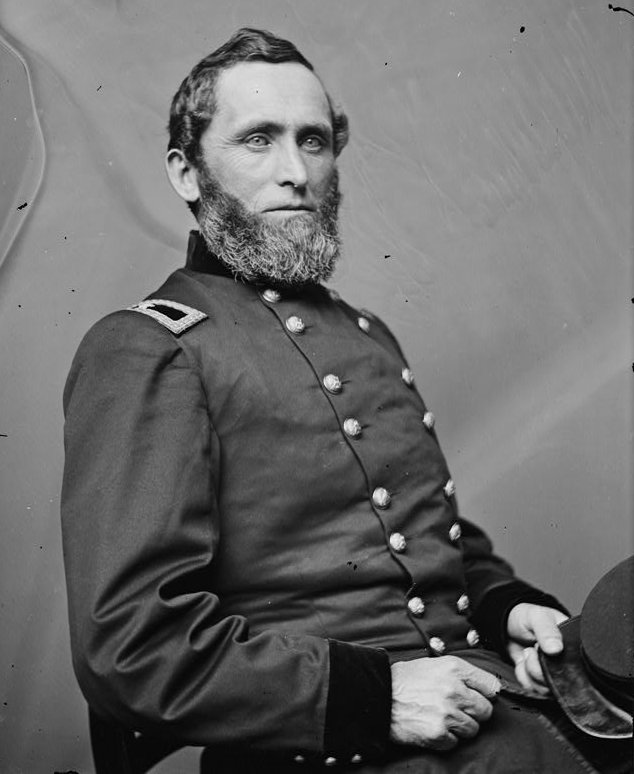
- Prentiss in the 1860s
- Born: November 23, 1819; Belleville, Virginia, U.S.
- Died: February 8, 1901 (aged 81); Bethany, Missouri, U.S.
- Spouses: Margaret Ann Sodowsky (m. 1838; died 1860) Mary Worthington Whitney (m. 1862)
- Children: 12
- Military career
- Allegiance: United States; Union
- Branch: United States Army; Union Army
- Service years: 1846–1848, 1861–1863
- Rank: Major General
- Conflicts: American Civil War; Battle of Mount Zion Church; Battle of Shiloh (POW); Battle of Helena

Benjamin Mayberry Prentiss (November 23, 1819 – February 8, 1901) was an American soldier and politician. He fought in the Mexican–American War and on the Union side of the American Civil War, rising to the rank of major general. He commanded a division at the Battle of Shiloh, which suffered heavy casualties while defending what became known as the Hornet's Nest from continued Confederate assaults, and he eventually surrendered his division. He was criticized by some for his conduct in that battle. After his exchange, he continued to serve in the army until his resignation in 1863. He spent much of his remaining life practicing as a lawyer and as a politician in the Republican Party.

== Early life, marriages and family ==
Benjamin Mayberry Prentiss was born in Belleville, Virginia. He was a direct descendant of Valentine Prentice, who immigrated from England in 1631. His early childhood was spent in Virginia until his family joined the migration and moved near Hannibal, Missouri. They then moved to Quincy, Illinois, where Prentiss made his home until 1879. He then moved to Missouri.

In his early life, Benjamin Prentiss was a rope-maker and served as an auctioneer. On March 29, 1838, he married Margaret Ann Sodowsky; they had seven children before she died in 1860. In 1862, he married Mary Worthington Whitney, who bore him five more children.

== Civil War ==
Prentiss ran unsuccessfully for Congress in 1860. At the beginning of the American Civil War he was commissioned a brigadier general of volunteers on May 17, 1861. Ulysses S. Grant was given command of Southeast Missouri in September, Prentiss was sent to northern Missouri.

That August, President Lincoln nominated 34 men for brigadier general's commissions in the volunteer army, which had to be confirmed by the Senate to be made binding. These appointments were apportioned out among the states according to population, and Illinois would get four generals—Grant, Prentiss, Stephen A. Hurlbut, and John A. McClernand (of these four men, only Grant was a West Pointer, the other three being political appointments).

In the middle of September, Major General John C. Fremont, who commanded the Department of Missouri, had sent Prentiss to command in the southeast of the state, temporarily putting Grant out of a job. The latter had been promoted to brigadier general of volunteers on August 9, back-dated to May 17, the same day Prentiss received his brigadier's commission. Since Grant was still a civilian in Illinois back in May, it was assumed Prentiss outranked him. In fact this wasn't true because army regulations stipulated that if two officers had a commission of the same date, seniority would be determined by previous rank. Prentiss had been a volunteer captain in the Mexican War but Grant had been a regular army captain, thus the latter outranked the former. After this mix-up was corrected, Grant regained his command.

Grant recalls in his Personal Memoirs:

Two or three days after my arrival at Cape Girardeau, word came that General Prentiss was approaching that place (Jackson). I started at once to meet him there and to give him his orders. As I turned the first corner of a street after starting, I saw a column of cavalry passing the next street in front of me. I turned and rode around the block the other way, so as to meet the head of the column. I found there General Prentiss himself, with a large escort. He had halted his troops at Jackson for the night, and had come on himself to Cape Girardeau, leaving orders for his command to follow him in the morning. I gave the General his orders — which stopped him at Jackson-but he was very much aggrieved at being placed under another brigadier-general, particularly as he believed himself to be the senior.

He had been a brigadier, in command at Cairo, while I was mustering officer at Springfield without any rank. But we were nominated at the same time for the United States service, and both our commissions bore date May 17, 1861. By virtue of my former army rank I was, by law, the senior. General Prentiss failed to get orders to his troops to remain at Jackson, and the next morning early they were reported as approaching Cape Girardeau. I then ordered the General very peremptorily to countermarch his command and take it back to Jackson. He obeyed the order, but bade his command adieu when he got them to Jackson, and went to St. Louis and reported himself. This broke up the expedition. But little harm was done, as Jeff. Thompson moved light and had no fixed place for even nominal headquarters. He was as much at home in Arkansas as he was in Missouri and would keep out of the way of a superior force. Prentiss was sent to another part of the State.

General Prentiss made a great mistake on the above occasion, one that he would not have committed later in the war. When I came to know him better, I regretted it much. In consequence of this occurrence he was off duty in the field when the principal campaign at the West was going on, and his juniors received promotion while he was [135] where none could be obtained. He would have been next to myself in rank in the district of south-east Missouri, by virtue of his services in the Mexican war. He was a brave and very earnest soldier. No man in the service was more sincere in his devotion to the cause for which we were battling; none more ready to make sacrifices or risk life in it.

== Shiloh ==
Early in the morning, an officer under his command, Colonel Everett Peabody, sent out a 250-man patrol which made contact with the advancing Confederate army, providing the Union army with critical early warning of the impending attack. Prentiss was initially outraged with Peabody for sending out a patrol without his authorization, but soon realized he was facing an oncoming attack by an entire Confederate army and rushed to prepare his men for defense. His division was the first one attacked at the Battle of Shiloh and suffered greatly during the opening hours of that battle. Brigadier General Prentiss reformed his command with reinforcements under the command of General W. H. L. Wallace and put up a spirited fight in the "Hornet's Nest".

Prentiss took full command of the position after Wallace was fatally wounded and eventually surrendered the Hornet's Nest along with 2,200 other Union soldiers. He surrendered his sword to Lt. Colonel Francis Marion Walker of the 19th Tennessee Infantry. After the battle he was considered a hero, having held off the Confederate States Army long enough to allow General Grant to organize a counterattack and win the battle. Grant later played down Prentiss's role in the victory, possibly because of mutual dislike between the two generals. However, Grant said in his memoirs "Prentiss' command was gone as a division, many of its members having been killed, wounded or captured; but it had rendered valiant services before its final dispersal, and had contributed a good share to the defense of Shiloh". Prentiss's own after-action report did not mention the aid of Wallace's troops, and barely made any mention of Peabody, who was also killed in action during the battle.

After being released as part of a prisoner exchange in October of the same year, Prentiss was promoted to major general and served on the court-martial board that convicted Fitz John Porter. His dissenting voice in the final vote damaged his political clout. Prentiss was sent to Arkansas and won the Battle of Helena on July 4, 1863. In 1863, he resigned to tend to his family. Historian Ezra J. Warner speculated that Prentiss felt that he was being shelved after having proved his abilities at Shiloh and Helena.

== Post-Civil War career ==
Prentiss became a lawyer after the war. He was later appointed as postmaster of Bethany, Harrison County, Missouri, by President Benjamin Harrison and was re-appointed by President William McKinley. He was a leader in the Republican Party of Missouri.

He died on February 8, 1901, in Bethany at age 81. He is buried there in Miriam Cemetery.

== See also ==
- List of American Civil War generals (Union)
