= Howard Z. Plummer =

Howard Zebulun Plummer (16 November 1899 in Philadelphia, Pennsylvania - 24 February 1980) was a Black Hebrew Israelite religious leader.

== Early life ==
Plummer was born in Philadelphia on November 16, 1899, the son of William H. Plummer and Jennie E. Bonds. His father joined the Church of God and Saints of Christ soon after Howard’s birth, and the Plummer family became intimately involved in its doctrine and work. In August, 1900, in the city of Philadelphia Howard's parents brought him to be blessed by the Church’s founder, prophet William Saunders Crowdy. Crowdy observed that throughout the blessing, Howard looked directly at him and reportedly said, "Plummer, this boy is looking down my throat and taking in every word I say. Someday, he is going to be a great preacher."

== Religious career ==
On 20 April 1917, soon after his father - now Bishop - became the executive leader of the Church of God and Saints of Christ, he was ordained a minister by his father. Following his ordination, he became affectionately known as "Elder Howard" to all of his friends and the membership. Also in 1917, his father appointed him General Superintendent of the Sabbath Schools.

After the death of Bishop Plummer on December 22, 1931, at a meeting of Church Officials held December 28, 1931, in Belleville, Elder Calvin S. Skinner consecrated Elder Howard Z. Plummer and proclaimed him as Leader of the Church of God and Saints of Christ. Plummer led this congregation for over 43 years, ending his tenure in 1975.

Rabbi Plummer's religious life embraced contact with many of the country's leading ministers and educators and collaboration with them in numerous activities. His earnest and productive accomplishments resulted in his being awarded the Doctor of Divinity Degree by Wilberforce University, Wilberforce, Ohio, in 1944.

Rabbi Howard Z. Plummer was noted for his humanitarian efforts, including

- Grand Master, Grand Lodge of Virginia, PHA
- Member Phi Beta Sigma fraternity (initiated at Alpha Alpha, Wilberforce University)
- Member, Board of Directors Norfolk State College Foundation (This board financially assisted in the formulation of Norfolk State University, Norfolk, Virginia.)
- Past President, Interracial Interdenominational Hampton Ministers Conference, 1954. It was during his administration that the Reverends Gardner C. Taylor and Martin Luther King Jr. made one of their memorable appearances as Conference Preachers.
