= Church of God and Saints of Christ =

Hebrew Israelite group

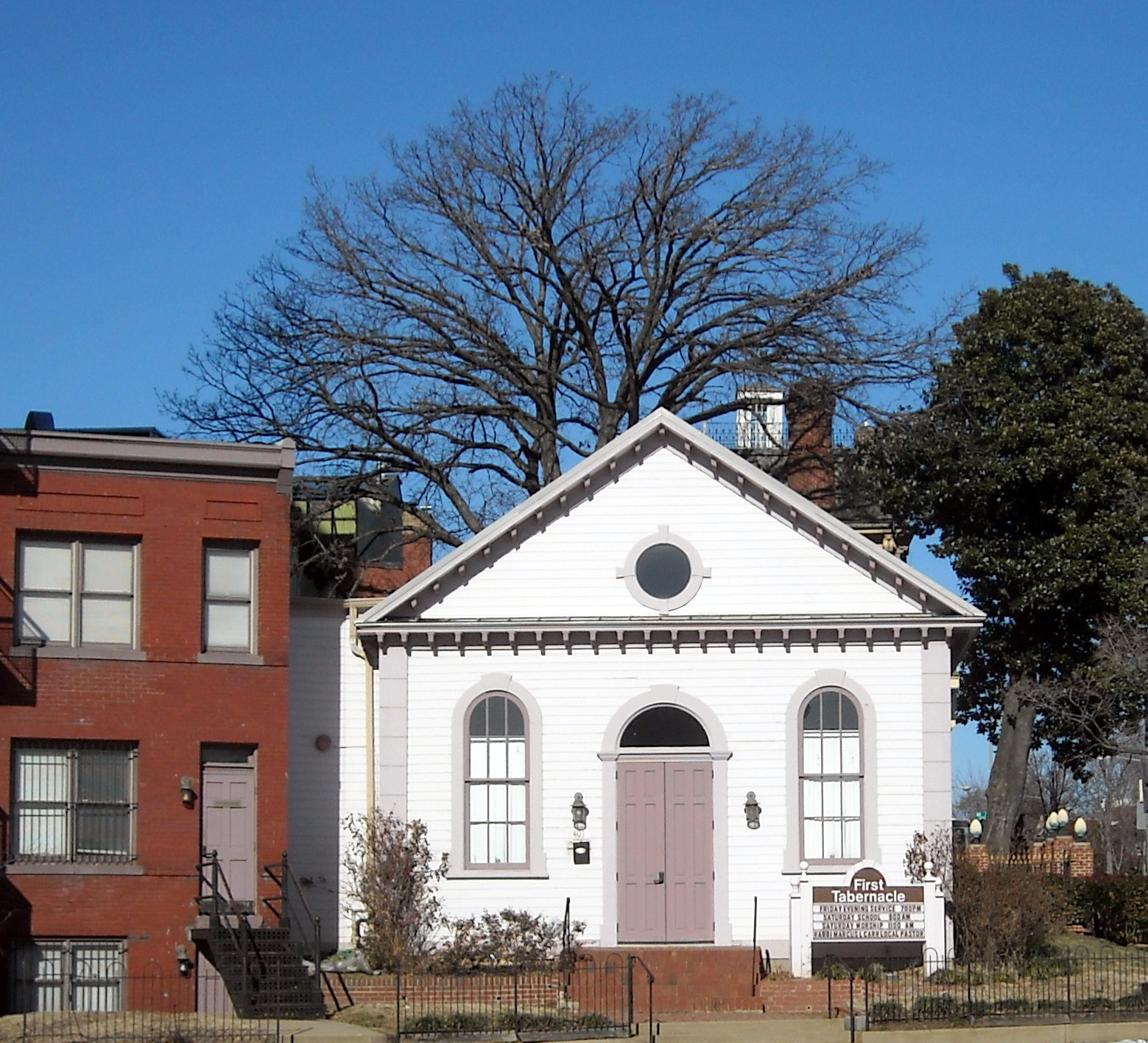
- A current local branch of the Church of God and Saints of Christ, in Washington, D.C., known as "First Tabernacle."
- Classification: Syncretic: Judaism and Christianity
- Orientation: Hebrew Israelite
- Scripture: Hebrew Bible; New Testament
- Chief Rabbi: Phillip Eugene McNeil
- Headquarters: Belleville, Virginia, United States
- Territory: United States, Africa, Cuba, West Indies
- Founder: William Saunders Crowdy
- Origin: 1896; Lawrence, Kansas, United States
- Separations: Church of God and Saints of Christ; Church of God and Saints
- Tabernacles: c. 70 (as of 2005)
- Official website: cogasoc.org

The Church of God and Saints of Christ is a Hebrew Israelite religious organization established in Lawrence, Kansas, in the United States, by William Saunders Crowdy in 1896. William Crowdy began congregations in several cities in the Midwestern and Eastern United States, and sent an emissary to organize locations in at least six African countries. The congregation later established locations in Cuba and the West Indies.

== Religious beliefs ==
Described as keys, the religious beliefs are drawn from the Hebrew Bible and New Testament:

1. The Church of God and Saints of Christ (I Corinthians 1:2)
2. Wine is forbidden to be drunk in the Church of God forever (Leviticus 10:9)
3. Unleavened bread and water for Christ's body and blood (Matthew 26:26–28)
4. Foot-Washing is a commandment (John 13:1–8)
5. The Disciple's Prayer must be taught (Matthew 6:9–14)
6. You must be breathed upon and saluted into the Church of God with a holy kiss. (John 20:22, Romans 16:16)
7. The Ten Commandments must be kept forever (Exodus 20:1–18, Revelation 22:14)

Crowdy believed and taught that Jesus of Nazareth was the Son of God and messiah. Presently, different beliefs are practiced by other organizations who claim to be followers of William Crowdy. The main branch of the organization, headquartered in Belleville, Virginia, gravitated toward Judaism after the death of William Crowdy. Another branch, headquartered in Cleveland, OH, claims adherence to the founder's original teaching of Jesus Christ as Son of God.

The Church of God and Saints of Christ, headquartered in Belleville, describes itself as "the oldest African-American congregation in the United States that adheres to the tenets of Judaism." The congregation subscribes to the belief in one God, love for all mankind, and the Ten Commandments as the basis for ethical and moral living. It further teaches that, among the descendants of the biblical Israelites, there are peoples of African descent. The congregation believes "in the equality of all men, and the equality of the sexes." Members believe that Jesus was neither God nor the Son of God, but rather a strict adherent to Judaism and a prophet. They also consider William Saunders Crowdy to be a prophet.

== Religious rituals ==
The Church of God and Saints of Christ synthesizes rituals drawn from both the Hebrew Bible and New Testament. Some of the movement's observances, such as circumcision, use of the Hebrew calendar, the wearing of kippot by men, sabbatarianism, and celebration of Passover and other religious holy days, are loosely based on the Torah.

Its rites based on the New Testament include baptism (immersion), the consecration of bread and water as Christ's body and blood, and footwashing.

== Facilities ==
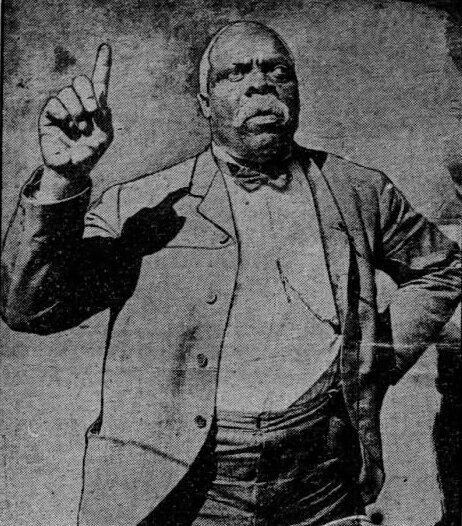
Prophet and founder, Crowdy, in 1907

The group established its headquarters in Philadelphia in 1899, and William S. Crowdy later relocated to Washington, D.C., in 1903.

In 1906, Crowdy named Joseph Wesley Crowdy, William Henry Plummer, and Calvin Samuel Skinner as leaders of the congregation. Led by these three individuals, the organization continued to grow in membership.

In 1921, William Henry Plummer moved the organization's headquarters to its permanent location in Belleville (city of Suffolk), Virginia, which was purchased by William S. Crowdy in 1903 as the intended headquarters for the organization.

Howard Zebulun Plummer was consecrated by Calvin S. Skinner as head of the organization in 1931, and served for over 40 years until 1975.

By 1936, the Church of God and Saints of Christ had more than 200 "tabernacles" (congregations) and 37,000 members.

Levi Solomon Plummer became the church's leader in 1975. Under the leadership of Levi Solomon Plummer, the congregation constructed a temple at its headquarters, Temple Beth El, in two phases, the first in 1980 and the second in 1987.

Afterwards, the congregation began to rebuild the headquarters land in Virginia originally purchased by William S. Crowdy. In 2001, the Church of God and Saints of Christ was led by Rabbi Jehu A. Crowdy Jr., a great-grandson of William Saunders Crowdy. After the death of Crowdy Jr., on April 10, 2016, aged 46 years, Chief Rabbi Phillip Eugene McNeil took over leadership of the Church.

As of 2005, it had fifty tabernacles in the United States, dozens in Africa, and one in Kingston, Jamaica. The organization also manages businesses and residential properties at its headquarters in Suffolk, Virginia, including a hotel and two living communities for senior citizens.

== Independent branches ==
As early as 1909, local branches of the organization severed their ties with the congregation, forming their own organizations. The first of these was headed by Malinda Morris, an early and favored follower of Crowdy, and based in Newark, New Jersey (where it still exists).

Today, two of the groups not affiliated with Chief Rabbi McNeil are also called the Church of God and Saints of Christ, headquartered in Cleveland, Ohio, and another group headquartered in New Haven, Connecticut.

== See also ==
- Mykki Blanco
