= John A. Buchanan =

American judge (1843–1921)

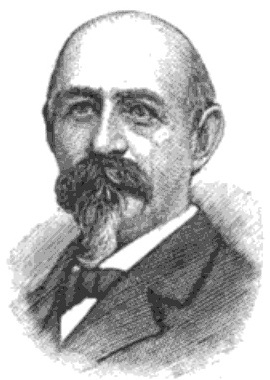
- Buchanan in 1903

Judge of the Court of Appeals of Virginia
- In office January 1, 1895 – January 11, 1915
- Preceded by: Thomas T. Fauntleroy
- Succeeded by: Joseph L. Kelly

Member of the United States House of Representatives
- In office March 4, 1889 – March 3, 1893
- Preceded by: Henry Bowen
- Succeeded by: James W. Marshall
- Constituency: Virginia's 9th congressional district

Member of the Virginia House of Delegates
- In office 1885–1887 Serving with Abram Fulkerson
- Preceded by: Jonas Kelley, Daniel Trigg
- Succeeded by: Samuel Porter Edmondson, John Roberts
- Constituency: Washington County

Personal details
- Born: John Alexander Buchanan; October 7, 1843 near Groseclose, Smyth County, Virginia, U.S.
- Died: September 2, 1921 (aged 77) near Emory, Virginia, U.S.
- Resting place: Old Glade Spring Presbyterian Cemetery, Glade Spring, Virginia, U.S.
- Education: Emory and Henry College (A.B.); University of Virginia Law School
- Occupation: Attorney
- Military career
- Allegiance: Confederate States of America
- Branch: Confederate States Army
- Service years: 1861–1865
- Rank: Private
- Units: Company D, 4th Virginia Infantry Regiment, Stonewall Brigade
- Conflicts: American Civil War; Battle of Gettysburg

John Alexander Buchanan (October 7, 1843 – September 2, 1921) was a member of the United States House of Representatives from Virginia and a judge of the Court of Appeals of Virginia.

== Early life ==
John Alexander Buchanan was born on October 7, 1843, near Groseclose, Smyth County, Virginia, the son of James Augustus Buchanan and Mary Glenn (Thomas) Buchanan. He was educated in the schools of Smyth County, the academy in the Chatham Hill hamlet of Saltville, Virginia, and the one in Marion, Virginia.

== Military service ==
In July 1861, Buchanan enlisted for the American Civil War as a private in the Confederate States Army's Company D, 4th Virginia Infantry Regiment, Stonewall Brigade. He took part in several engagements, and was detailed to several additional duties, including military hospital nurse for six months in 1862, and teamster in May and June 1863. He returned to his company in July, and was wounded in the arm and captured at the Battle of Gettysburg in July 1863. He was a prisoner of war at Point Lookout, Maryland from July 1863 until his release in February 1865.

== Early career ==
Buchanan graduated from Emory and Henry College with an A.B. in 1870, then studied at the University of Virginia Law School from 1870 to 1871. He was admitted to the bar in 1872, and practiced in Abingdon from 1872 to 1892.

Among Buchanan's civic activities was membership in Abingdon's Maury Literary Association, including a term as first vice president. In addition, he served as president of the Stonewall Jackson Female Institute's board of trustees. (Note: The Stonewall Jackson Female Institute in Abingdon was later renamed Stonewall Jackson College. It operated from 1868 until 1930, when its debts forced it to close during the Great Depression.) A Democrat in politics, Buchanan was a delegate to numerous local and state party conventions, and routinely gave speeches at rallies and other campaign events.

During the post-Reconstruction era in Virginia, politics was dominated by the issue of "readjustment" ‒ whether the state would honor its pre-Civil War and wartime debts, including bond issues that financed infrastructure projects, or whether the debt would be "readjusted" to a lower amount through refinancing some obligations at lower interest rates, repudiating others, and other similar measures. The Readjuster Party, a coalition of Republicans, African Americans and working class whites, supported readjustment. The Democratic Party included former supporters of the Confederacy, among them the Planter class, bankers, and attorneys, who organized as the Conservative Party and opposed readjustment on the grounds that failing to honor the state's obligations would reduce its future borrowing ability. Buchanan was identified with the Conservative Party, which worked throughout the 1870s and early 1880s to defeat Republicans and Readjusters and "redeem" Virginia.

== Continued career ==
Buchanan was a member of the Virginia House of Delegates from 1885 to 1887. In 1888 he was elected to the United States House of Representatives. Because Buchanan's predecessor was a Republican and former Readjuster, Buchanan's victory was celebrated by Democrats as a "redemption" of his congressional district. He was reelected in 1890 and served two terms, March 4, 1889 to March 3, 1893. He did not run for reelection in 1892. During his congressional service, Buchanan was a member of the Judiciary and Merchant Marine and Fisheries committees.

In 1894, Buchanan was elected to a seat on the Court of Appeals of Virginia, and he served from January 1, 1895, until retiring in January 1915. Democrats who gained control of the legislature after the end of the Readjuster movement reorganized the courts, and Buchanan and his colleagues who were elected in 1894 "redeemed" the court by replacing Readjuster judges who had been elected in 1882. In 1913, Buchanan received the honorary degree of LL.D. from Hampden–Sydney College. After retiring, Buchanan lived on a farm near Emory, Washington County, Virginia.

== Personal life ==
Buchanan never married, and had no children. He died at his farm near Emory on September 2, 1921. Buchanan was buried at Old Glade Spring Presbyterian Cemetery in Glade Spring, Virginia.

== Notes ==
U.S. House of Representatives
Preceded by Henry Bowen	Member of the U.S. House of Representatives from Virginia's 9th congressional district 1889-1893	Succeeded by James W. Marshall
