= 19th Tennessee Infantry Regiment =

- Flag of Tennessee
- Active: 1861–1865
- Country: Confederate States of America
- Allegiance: Confederate States Army
- Branch: Army of Tennessee
- Type: Infantry
- Engagements: Cumberland Gap (Garrison Duty) * Barbourville * Mill Springs *Shiloh * Vicksburg * Baton Rouge * Murfreesboro * Chickamauga * Chattanooga * Missionary Ridge * Atlanta * Franklin * Nashville * Bentonville

Commanders
- Notable commanders: David H. Cummings; Carrick W. Heiskell; Francis M. Walker

The 19th Tennessee Infantry Regiment, or Nineteenth Tennessee Volunteer Infantry Regiment, was an infantry regiment in the Confederate States Army during the American Civil War. The 19th Tennessee fought in every major battle and campaign of the Army of Tennessee except the Battle of Perryville. First Lieutenant Robert D. Powell of Company K, killed at the Battle of Barbourville, Kentucky, is believed to be the first soldier killed during the Civil War in that state.

The 19th Tennessee was formed from companies of men from the counties of East Tennessee and was mustered into the Confederate army at Knoxville, Tennessee, in the spring of 1861. Beginning the war with a force of over 1,000 men, only 78 soldiers were present when the 19th surrendered. Fifty-eight of the remaining 78 soldiers were from the initial muster at the beginning of the war. The remaining 20 soldiers had joined the regiment later.

The regiment was encamped at Greensboro, North Carolina, when the Army of Tennessee surrendered on April 26, 1865. The 19th Tennessee's regimental flag was not surrendered to the Union army, and is currently in a private collection.

== The Antebellum Period in East Tennessee ==
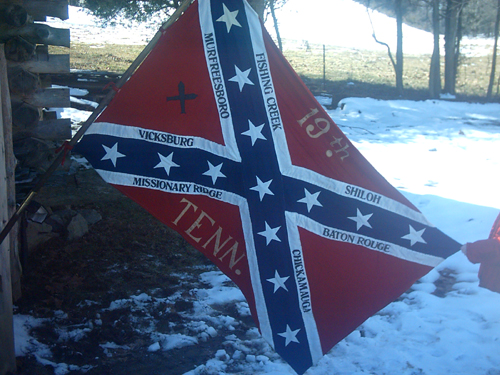
Flag of the 19th Tennessee Infantry Reenactors. The original flag is currently in a private collection. The design is based on other Tennessee regimental flags and a drawing from a circa 1897 veterans reunion, at which the 19th's flag may have been present. It differs from the original battle flag of the 19th TN as the original was not adorned with battle honors or crossed cannons.

The state of Tennessee consists of three major divisions—East, Middle, and West Tennessee. The geography of Middle Tennessee consists of rolling hills, and West Tennessee is generally flat, but East Tennessee has some of the most rugged terrain in the Appalachian Mountains. The rugged terrain of East Tennessee hampered the development of agricultural land in the region, and delayed the development of roads and railways, while obstructions in the Tennessee River below Chattanooga hampered the development of water transportation, making it difficult for East Tennesseans to bring any products to markets. Thus, the agrarianism of the region was limited to food production rather than the production of "cash crops".

This began to change with the completions of the East Tennessee and Georgia Railroad in 1855, linking Knoxville to Georgia, and the East Tennessee and Virginia Railroad in 1858, linking Knoxville to Bristol. With the completion of these railways, farmers in East Tennessee could finally transport produce, primarily hogs and corn, to Virginia and the Deep South, and a new cash crop emerged in the regions economy: wheat. By the mid-1850s, wheat production in the region had risen by 300 percent.

With the increase and development of agriculture in East Tennessee, there was a corresponding increase in the slave population of the region during the decade of the 1850s—some 21 percent, as opposed to an increase of only 14 percent in the white population. While only about one-fourth of Southerners, as a whole, could afford to own any slaves at all, and the majority being owned by the wealthiest 6 percent, only about 10 percent of East Tennesseans were slaveholders.

Though Tennessee had a strong Union loyalist coalition, with East Tennessee having a particularly strong Unionist presence, in the months following South Carolina's secession, the coalition soon began to splinter. Lincoln's call for 75,000 volunteers to put down the rebellion in the South left many of loyalists feeling betrayed. With most loyalists feeling betrayed by Lincoln, secessionist leaders quickly moved to exploit the shift in public opinion.

On April 25, 1861, only thirteen days after General P.G.T. Beauregard's Confederate gunners opened fire on Fort Sumter, Tennessee's legislature met to consider the question of secession. On May 6, the legislature declared the state independent from the United States. The legislature also granted Governor Isham G. Harris the authority to create a state army of 55,000 men.

Though a military alliance was signed with the Confederate States of America the very next day, Tennessee's Declaration of Independence was submitted for a referendum to be held on June 8. Almost 70 percent of the voters approved of secession, but 69 percent of East Tennesseans voted against it. Nonetheless, Tennessee officially seceded from the Union and joined the Confederacy.

While Union loyalists viewed the coming war as a struggle for Republican government, secessionists saw Lincoln as a tyrant and many citizens abandoned the old Union for the new Confederacy to remain true to the principles of the Founding Fathers.

== Formation of the 19th Tennessee Infantry ==
By the end of May, more than twenty volunteer companies met just outside Knoxville at Camp Cummings, named after David H. Cummings, a prominent farmer and attorney of the region. The 19th Tennessee Infantry was officially formed there as East Tennessee's second Confederate regiment on June 11, 1861, and Cummings was elected as its first colonel. That month, William Phipps wrote home to his sister, Charlotte, "we are the pick regiment of Tennessee."

According to Worsham's first person account, at the time of the regiment's formation, there were 1,012 men in the 19th's rank and file, and 48 commissioned officers, for a total of 1,060 soldiers.

== Organization ==
The original command structure of the 19th was as follows:

Colonel - David H. Cummings
Lt. Colonel - Francis Marion Walker
Major - Abram Fulkerson
Adjutant - V. Q. Johnson
Sgt.-Major - Henry M. Doak
Surgeon - Joseph E. Dulaney
Asst. Surgeon - Samuel Carson
Quarter Master - Addison D. Taylor
Chaplain - Rev. David Sullins

Musicians - Rufus Lamb, James Tyner, and W. J. Worsham

Company A (The Hamilton Grays) - Hamilton County, Tennessee, 97 Men
Captain - John D. Powell
1st Lieutenant - V. Q. Johnson
2nd Lieutenant - Daniel Kennedy
3rd Lieutenant - Frank Foust

Company B - Washington County, Tennessee, 100 Men
Captain - Zadoc T. "Zeb" Willett
1st Lieutenant - Joseph Conley
2nd Lieutenant - Nathan Gregg
3rd Lieutenant - James Deaderick

Company C (The Blountville Guards) - Sullivan County, Tennessee, 104 Men
Captain - James P. Snapp
1st Lieutenant - Charles St. John
2nd Lieutenant - George H. Hull
3rd Lieutenant - John M. Jones

Company D (The Gillespie Guards) - Rhea County, Tennessee, 103 Men
Captain - Warner E. Colville
1st Lieutenant - Pete Miller
2nd Lieutenant - James A. Wallace
3rd Lieutenant - S. J. A. Frazier

Company E (The Knoxville Guards/Grays) - Knoxville, Tennessee, 106 Men
Captain - John W. Paxton
1st Lieutenant - John M. Miller
2nd Lieutenant - J. K. Graham
3rd Lieutenant - William M. Lackey

Company F - Polk County, Tennessee, 93 Men
Captain - John H. Hannah
1st Lieutenant - P. C. Gaston
2nd Lieutenant - J. M. Sims
3rd Lieutenant - J. C. Holms

Company G - Sullivan County, Tennessee, 110 Men
Captain - Abraham L. Gammon
1st Lieutenant - Jas. A. Rhea
2nd Lieutenant - Robert L. Blair
3rd Lieutenant - James Carlton

Company H (The Milton Guards) - McMinn County, Tennessee, 94 Men
Captain - William H. Lowry Jr.
1st Lieutenant - U. S. York
2nd Lieutenant - D. A. Wilds
3rd Lieutenant - Thomas Maston

Company I (The Marsh Blues) - Hamilton County, Tennessee, 110 Men
Captain - Thomas H. Walker
1st Lieutenant - B. F. Moore
2nd Lieutenant - Warren Hooper
3rd Lieutenant - John Lovejoy

Company K (The Hawkins Boys) - Hawkins County, Tennessee, 100 Men
Captain - Carrick W. Heiskell
1st Lieutenant - Robert D. Powell
2nd Lieutenant - Sam P. Powell
3rd Lieutenant - Sam Spears

== Cumberland Gap ==
In July 1861, the 19th Tennessee received its first assignment to guard the pass at Cumberland Gap from any attempted incursions by the Union army from Kentucky, which remained a Union state and had declared neutrality despite the efforts of secessionists, into East Tennessee or Southwest Virginia. The gap is located at the junction of the three states and would have been a key invasion route into that region of the Confederacy, just as it was a key migration route through the rugged, mountainous terrain for settlers moving west. In his autobiography, Rev. David Sullins, the 19th's chaplain, claims to have been the first Confederate soldier to enter Cumberland Gap.

The regiment began building breastworks and fortifying the mountain pass, but was soon stricken with an epidemic of measles and mumps that nearly incapacitated the entire command. The regiment also recorded its first casualties at Cumberland Gap when a sergeant shot himself through the hand and when a box of percussion caps exploded, severely injuring Col. Francis M. Walker's hand.

In September, Maj. Gen. Leonidas Polk committed one of the Confederacy's worst strategic blunders by seizing Columbus, Kentucky, and ending the state's neutrality, thereby opening the door for Union forces to move through the Bluegrass State. General Albert Sidney Johnston was forced to move a considerable portion of the forces under his command to Bowling Green, Kentucky, to close the hole in his defensive line, and the 19th Tennessee, along with two other regiments, was relocated by General Felix Zollicoffer to Cumberland Ford, now Pineville, Kentucky, where they established Camp Buckner. Other regiments were brought up from the rear to reinforce Cumberland Gap.

== Battle of Barbourville ==
Union loyalist sentiment was as strong in Eastern Kentucky as it was in East Tennessee, and Zollicoffer feared that local Home Guard units might take action against his forces. On September 18, Zollicoffer sent a mixed force of 800 troops, including Companies B and K of the 19th, to destroy Camp Andrew Johnson, a Union training facility at Barbourville, KY.

In a dawn attack, the Confederates surprised about 300 Bushwhackers. The Unionists fled after a brief exchange of gunfire, and the Confederates took the camp and captured a meager store of supplies. Though several were wounded, only one man was killed. Lt. Robert D. Powell of Company K acquired the dubious distinction of being the first Confederate killed in the Western Theater of the American Civil War.

The regiment remained in Kentucky for a time, even managing a couple of successful raids to acquire supplies, but the assorted diseases that spread through the camps like wildfire were taking their tolls. By the end of the month, only about 600 men from the regiment were fit for duty.

By late October 1861, General Zollicoffer was receiving reports that a Union invasion somewhere between Cumberland Gap and Bowling Green was impending. His brigade returned to Tennessee, leaving a large garrison at Cumberland Gap, and the rest, including the 19th marched to Jamestown. Indeed, also believing that invasion was imminent, Unionist guerillas had stepped up actions in East Tennessee, including the burnings of several key railroad bridges, but the revolt was soon suppressed by Confederate reinforcements in the region.

== Mill Springs ==
With the local rebellion under control, Zollicoffer's forces, including the 19th Tennessee, returned to Kentucky in late November to establish winter camp near the tiny hamlet of Mill Springs on the south bank of the Cumberland River. The Union's Army of the Ohio responded by sending a brigade under the command of General Albin F. Schoepf to nearby Somerset to prevent Zollicoffer from crossing the river and advancing into Central Kentucky. Zollicoffer committed a potentially grave tactical error by crossing the Cumberland and established a fortified position on the north bank at Beech Grove—he had a numerically superior force on his front, and a flood-prone river to his rear. Camp Beech Grove appeared quite formidable with the river guarding its flanks, and breastworks and chevaux de frise protecting its front, but the appearance was deceiving. The entrenchments could not dispel a determined attack, and disease was continuing to deplete the brigade's manpower.

By the middle of December, President Jefferson Davis replaced Zollicoffer as commander of the Department of East Tennessee, though he remained in command of his brigade, with Maj. Gen. George B. Crittenden, but it would be almost a month before Crittenden arrived. By the time he took command in January, the river was flooded and the brigade was backed into a tactical corner if the Yankees attacked. Before arriving, Crittenden had ordered Zollicoffer to move to the south bank, but he continued to hold his position.

Union reinforcements were on their way into the area and so Crittenden, having been reinforced as well, chose to attack them before the two groups could unite. His troops set out at about 11:30 P.M. on January 19, 1862, marching through mud sometimes over a foot deep. Zollicoffer's brigade led the advance out of the entrenchments intending to attack at dawn, but bad weather and muddy roads slowed their advance. They encountered Union pickets about 6:00 A.M. and the element of surprise was lost.

The 19th Tennessee and 15th Mississippi engaged the Federal pickets in a running skirmish for a quarter of a mile. Zollicoffer's brigade reformed and pressed the attack, but the Federals had reinforced as well and the firing became more intense. The 19th and 25th Tennessee charged the Yankees and drove them back into the woods, but the attack faltered as confusion and chaos set in from limited visibility due to the rain, fog, smoke, thunder, and lightning. Nearsighted Zollicoffer became convinced that the 19th Tennessee was firing on the 15th Mississippi and, attempting to stop what he thought was friendly fire, rode toward the Union army. He realized his mistake too late when an aide began firing his pistol at the Yankees, but Zollicoffer was killed in a hail of fire before he could escape. The 19th had begun to break ranks to follow him, but fell back in confusion after he was killed.

Crittenden placed Colonel Cummings of the 19th Tennessee in command of Zollicoffer's brigade, and he attempted to correct his battle lines, but artillery support was ineffective, and the infantry's assortment of inferior rifles, including many flintlock muskets and country rifles that were misfiring in the rain and dampness, were no match for the Federals' superior .58 caliber, percussion cap Enfields. At 9:00 A.M., the Federals fixed bayonets and charged, and the Confederate lines broke. In the retreat, the 19th's surgeon, Joseph Dulaney, refused to leave the wounded and was captured, but later released.

The cold and exhausted Confederates retreated to Camp Beech Grove to dry off and prepare a meal, but the order to abandon the camp soon came. As Federal and Confederate cannons exchanged fire through the night; the troops were ferried across the river by a steamboat named the Noble Ellis. Some soldiers tried to swim and were drowned or swept away. After all the troops were on the south bank, Crittenden ordered the boat burned to prevent the Federals from following. The Confederates had to abandon their stores and had few provisions for the retreat. The troops were finally resupplied after reaching Gainesville on January 26. Two weeks later, they moved to Camp Fogg near Carthage, then to Murfreesboro, where the brigades joined with Albert Sidney Johnston's army.

== Shiloh ==
The Hornets Nest at Shiloh. The Sunken Road is the feature to the left of the snakerail fence. Confederate forces attacked Union forces from across a large field to the right.

Shiloh Church

Shiloh Church

General Beauregard was assembling a new army and requested Johnston to join him. Johnston marched his army south into Alabama while considering the offer. Along the way, some of the troops were issued new Enfield rifles, but the 19th Tennessee received reconditioned rifled muskets. Still, they were a vast improvement over the weapons that had contributed to their defeat at Fishing Creek.

Johnston decided to join Beauregard and so the 19th Tennessee, along with the rest of the brigade, left Decatur, Alabama, on March 15, 1862, and arrived in Corinth, Mississippi, on March 20. The combined forces of Beauregard and Johnston became the Army of Mississippi. When Crittenden was arrested for drunkenness, he was replaced by John C. Breckinridge, and the 19th Tennessee fell under his command.

Beauregard and Johnston hoped to liberate Middle and West Tennessee from Union control by attacking Major General Ulysses S. Grant's Army of the Tennessee at a riverboat port at Pittsburg Landing on the Tennessee River near Shiloh Church. By attacking Grant before Buell's Army of the Ohio arrived, Beauregard hoped to defeat the two armies separately.

By the time the attack was supposed to begin on the morning of April 4, it was already twelve hours behind schedule and a cold rain began falling that turned the roads into muck, forcing Johnston to postpone until the next morning. The rain continued through the night and by the afternoon of April 5, Beauregard's army was still not properly deployed, forcing another postponement. They finally achieved their staging positions late that night.

The attack on the Federal camp opened at 5:00 A.M., but Col. George Maney's battalion, the 19th Tennessee, and General Nathan Bedford Forrest's cavalry were sent to scout the Confederate rear in case Buell attempted a landing there. By 11:00 A.M., Maney was convinced that they were safe from Buell, so he detached the 19th Tennessee and Forrest's cavalry from his command, and they returned together to the front.

As they approached Sarah Bell's Field, Maney was approached by Maj. Gen. Frank Cheatham, who ordered him to take men of his choice and attack a Federal battery near the George Manse cabin. Maney chose his 1st Tennessee Battalion, 9th Tennessee, 6th and 7th Kentucky Infantry, and the 19th Tennessee to attack the position known as "The Hornet's Nest," with the 19th deployed on the right of his line. Maney's forces attacked the Federal position at 2:30 that afternoon, with the 19th crossing a cornfield and approaching Manse's cabin. Federal fire from the position intensified with the 19th taking several casualties—among others, Colonel Cummings lost a finger, Major Abram Fulkerson was shot in the thigh, and captains "Zeb" Willett of Company B and Thomas Walker of Company I were killed.

The Confederates stayed on the attack—the 19th stormed the cabin and took the woods to the west of the field. The 19th was released and sent back to the brigade. By 4:00 P.M., they had rejoined, and Breckinridge was launching an attack against the left flank of the Hornet's Nest. By 5:00 P.M. the nest was withering; a half-hour later, it fell. As they disarmed the Federal troops, the 19th Tennessee exchanged their reconditioned muskets for the Yankee's .58 caliber Enfields. Lieutenant Colonel Walker received Brigade General Benjamin M. Prentiss' sword in surrender.

That night, the 19th Tennessee ate well from the overrun Federal camps. Some bedded down in captured Federal tents and others on the ground, but they probably slept little that night. Union gunboats fired shells into the Confederate lines starting a brushfire that burned a considerable amount of ground where the dead and wounded still lay, and nature unleashed another deluge about 10:00 P.M. that lasted until 3:00 in the morning. Meanwhile, Buell's rested army landed and reinforced Grant.

Breckinridge had managed to keep his men assembled through the night, but many of the other regiments were scattered, which would cause considerable command and control problems the next morning. With the battle engaged, Grant's somewhat recovered army was exerting considerable pressure on the Confederate left flank to the west. Breckinridge had assembled his men and moved towards the Hornet's Nest, with the 19th Tennessee posted in the woods on the center-right of his line, where they began taking considerable artillery fire. Federal troops advanced from the woods near Bloody Pond toward the Manse cabin, but were met by intense artillery and musket fire from Bowen's and Stratham's brigades, including the 19th Tennessee. The Confederates counterattacked, but Federal artillery stopped their advance.

The Yankees pressed again, broke the Confederate line, and captured a battery of Washington artillery. The Rebels rallied in the woods and charged again to recapture the cannons with the Crescent Regiment of Louisiana engaging the Yankees hand-to-hand. Breckinridge asked who could aid them, and Lieutenant Colonel Francis Walker replied that the 19th Tennessee could. The 19th charged into the fighting with other elements of Stratham's brigade and pushed the Federals back, retaking the artillery battery. The 19th Tennessee Infantry Reenactors have an emblem of crossed cannon barrels on their regimental flag, signifying this action.

By noon, the Confederates were losing momentum and their lines starting to give way. Near Duncan Field, the 19th watched the Federals approach and opened fire on a regiment that had remained in column formation, and drove them back. William Tecumseh Sherman described the shooting as "the severest musketry fire I ever heard." The Federals counterattacked and pushed Breckinridge's corps from Duncan Field back toward Shiloh Church. By 2:00 P.M., the entire Confederate line was collapsing in the face of superior numbers and better rested and supplied Federal troops. Breckinridge's corps organized a rear guard action and held the Federals off, allowing the Army of Mississippi to safely retreat.

The next day, the corps moved to Mickie's Farm near Corinth and held the position, allowing Beauregard to organize a defense near the Mississippi town. The Battle of Shiloh was over, but at a cost of 23,000 combined casualties. Beauregard and, likewise, the 19th Tennessee suffered about 25 percent losses, from which the regiment never fully recovered.

A journalist from New Orleans wrote, "after Shiloh the South never smiled again."

The 19th Tennessee spent the next few weeks at Corinth in provost duty and reorganizing the regiment to compensate for their losses.

== Vicksburg ==
On May 22, 1862, Beauregard's army boarded trains for Tupelo as the 19th covered their withdrawal. The 19th followed on June 2 and arrived at Vicksburg on July 1.

Union gunboats on the Mississippi River were starting to threaten the town and the troops were garrisoned there as protection. The men of the 19th found the town charming and the people welcomed the soldiers at first. Soon, the soldiers were not as welcome as food ran low and the soldiers' presence began to draw fire on civilian positions. The soldiers' water source became contaminated and disease ran rampant with epidemics of measles, malaria, and dysentery among others. The ranks were severely depleted by death and disease, and a number of soldiers received medical discharges.

In late July, the Unionists ceased fire for the time being and the first assault of Vicksburg was over. Later on, when the Union gunboats resumed and the town was under siege, soldiers and civilians had to resort to eating rats and mule meat to survive.

== Baton Rouge ==
The 19th's division was removed from Vicksburg and sent into Louisiana to attack Federal positions at Baton Rouge. By this time, the 19th Tennessee was a regiment in name only and could only muster less than 100 healthy men, so they were consolidated with the remnants of other regiments to form a battalion. One-third of the Confederate force had no shoes, many lacked shirts and coats, and some were almost naked. They carried no tents and had only two days worth of rations in their haversacks.

The heat and humidity of the march took their toll, as well as a lack of sources of clean drinking water. The men of the 19th were soon beset with exhaustion, fever, chills, and bloody diarrhea from dysentery. By the time they reached the Comite River, ten miles from Baton Rouge, only about 2,600 effective soldiers remained and many of those were seriously ill. When the divisions marched on the Union positions just before dawn, fog limited the ability to see more than "twenty steps" and there were not enough troops to form the standard double battle line.

Still, the Confederates managed to press the attack and drove the Union army back, but only to a prepared defensive position. The CSS Arkansas, a Rebel gunboat, had been intended to provide support, but it had run aground. With only about 1,000 soldiers still fit to fight and having run out of water, the Rebels could not risk another attack. Civilians helped gather the wounded and the dead.

The Confederates occupied Port Hudson for a time and fearing another attack by them, Union forces abandoned Baton Rouge on August 18.

== Murfreesboro ==
The men of the 19th recuperated for the rest of the month in Jackson, Mississippi and the troops left ill at Vicksburg and Baton Rouge began to trickle back in. The men of the 19th Tennessee stitched the battle honors of Fishing Creek, Shiloh, Vicksburg, and Baton Rouge into their regimental flag, to which they were fiercely devoted. The 19th's flag was never surrendered to the Yankees at the end of the war and its whereabouts are unknown.

In September, the 19th's brigade was sent to Knoxville via Chattanooga in cattle cars on a train that the men described as "filthy beyond description". By this time, the 19th could only muster about 150 effectives, but that number increased to about 380 by the end of Fall. On October 15, the regiment was moved to Loudon where they continued recruiting and building their depleted numbers. By Winter, they were in Murfreesboro. As Union forces under the command of Gen. William Rosecrans approached, one of the strangest battles of the war commenced: a battle of musicians. When Union bands played "Yankee Doodle", the Confederates answered with "Dixie" and "Bonnie Blue Flag" was answered with "Hail Columbia". Finally, the bands of both sides joined in playing "Home Sweet Home" and the men of both sides sang together.

The Confederates decided to seize the moment and attacked first, driving Union forces back for some two miles before grinding to a halt. The men of the 19th Tennessee overran and artillery battery that had shelled them, but was met with another fusillade of fire, killing the regiment's flag bearer. Corporal John Mason picked up the flag and held it high and inspiring the troops, who forced the Federals back.

The Confederates forced the Union all the way to the Nashville Pike before the attack petered out after a heavy barrage of Union canister. The Rebels managed to capture 300 small arms, ammunition, and supplies, along with 50 Federals, but the 19th, who had entered the battle with 382 men, suffered 136 casualties. First Sergeant Amos C. Smith of Washington County was among those cited for gallantry.

The Federals dug in, eventually forcing Gen. Braxton Bragg to withdraw his forces, which severely demoralized the troops. The 19th winter quartered at Shelbyville.

== Chickamauga ==
During the winter of 1863, a Christian movement of "big revivals" developed among the Army of Tennessee, along with a great deal of dissension against General Braxton Bragg. Bragg was a fairly good military strategist, but his personality was strongly detested by his commanders and ranks. Thus, his campaigns tended to be well planned, but poorly executed by his commanders.

Bragg's army entered Chattanooga on July 7, 1863. By this time, Vicksburg and Middle Tennessee had fallen, and Lee had been defeated at Gettysburg. The 19th Tennessee dug in on a hill above the town's landing and awaited the federals. Federal artillery soon began to bombard the town on soldiers and civilians alike. On September 8, Bragg realized that Rosecran's army was behind him and that the Army of Tennessee would have to abandon its fortifications or be cut off, and so his forces abandoned Chattanooga and marched toward Rome, Georgia.

By this time, Federal troops occupied much of East Tennessee and with Unionist guerrillas anxious to punish the region's Rebels and their families, desertions from the army rose dramatically, taking their toll on all units, including the 19th. However, some "deserters" were actually decoys sent by Bragg to make the Confederate Army of Tennessee's dilemma appear worse than it actually was in an attempt to bolster overconfidence and force the Union army into careless acts that Bragg could exploit.

On September 12, Bragg ordered Gen. Leonidas Polk to take a division and attack the Yankees, but Polk ignored the order. By the next day, an entire Union corps was positioned on the opposite bank of Chickamauga Creek. Even after Bragg sent reinforcements, Polk was still overly cautious and did not move until 9 AM. A brief skirmish ensued with Polk attempting to draw the Yankees out, but they didn't take the bait.

The 19th Tennessee, tired, hungry, and apprehensive, did not join the fighting until September 18. By that time, Bragg's army had crossed the creek around 7 AM. The dense brush and undergrowth made advancing difficult and commanders had to pause to straighten their lines. Passing near the 19th, Gen. Benjamin Cheatham yelled, "Give them hell, boys, give them hell!" Gen. Polk, a bishop in the Episcopal church, yelled, "Give them what General Cheatham says, we will pay off old chores today." About that time, a shell crashed nearby wounding two men. Within minutes, the Rebels and Yankees were heavily engaged.

The Confederates managed to force the Federals back into their breastworks, but the attack stalled as ammunition ran low. Reinforced by reserve units, the Rebels pressed again with the 19th on the extreme right of the line. In fifteen minutes, 75 of the unit's 242 men were struck down, but the steady nerve of Colonel Francis Walker held them together. A number of Company level officers were cut down.

The Confederate lines began to buckle as the Federals advanced, but a Rebel artillery barrage of canister and grapeshot, effective turning the big guns into shotguns, forced the Unionists to retreat. The 19th lost 40% of its total strength, with 8 killed, 66 men wounded, and 20 missing, but the Tennesseans held their ground. The Rebels attacked again at dusk, but the attack sputtered in the darkness. Temperatures that night fell to near freezing, but the proximity of enemy forces prevented the use of campfires. Meanwhile, the Federals spent the night fortifying their earthworks. The battle resumed about 9:30 the next morning and about 11 AM, a mix up in orders caused the Federals to pull a division out of the center just as the Rebels came screaming in. The Unionists panicked and their lines splintered. The Army of Tennessee had its victory.

Bragg received word that the Federals had abandoned Chattanooga, but arrived there to find them entrenched. He decided to lay siege to the town and it worked, with the deprivation of the Federals soon matching that of the Confederates. Two divisions, including the 19th Tennessee were sent to Sweetwater to prevent Rosecrans from being reinforced, but there was little for them to do. This was the last time that the East Tennessee Confederates would see home until the end of the war.

== The 19th Tennessee Infantry Reenactors ==
The Co. B, 19th Tennessee Infantry Reenactors Honor Guard at the dedication ceremony for a new gravemarker for 1st Lieutenant Robert J. Tipton of the Old Co. B, 19th Tennessee Infantry.

A group of Civil War reenactors from Northeast Tennessee and Southwest Virginia represents Company B (Washington County) of the 19th Tennessee Infantry. The unit was organized in the late 1980s and continues to the present. The group participates in many reenactments of Army of Tennessee battles, gravesite and monument dedications, parades, school programs, and other events. They served as the Honor Guard at the gravesite during the funeral for the crew of the H. L. Hunley (submarine) on April 17, 2004, at Magnolia Cemetery in Charleston, South Carolina.

Previous captains of the 19th Tennessee Infantry Reenactors were Scott Templeton, Jerry Nave, Richard Gouge, Richard Ragle and Scot Koenig. The unit is currently commanded by Captain Ric Dulaney.

== See also ==
- List of Tennessee Confederate Civil War units
