= Virginia's 9th congressional district =

U.S. House district for Virginia

Coordinates: 36°59′00″N 81°21′02″W

- Interactive map of district boundaries since 2023
- Representative: Morgan Griffith; R–Salem
- Area: 9,113.87 mi^{2} (23,604.8 km^{2})
- Distribution: 58.25% rural; 41.75% urban
- Population (2025): 776,616
- Median household income: $62,842
- Ethnicity: 86.8% White; 5.7% Black; 4.2% other; 3.3% Two or more races; 3.0% Hispanic; 1.7% Asian
- Cook PVI: R+22

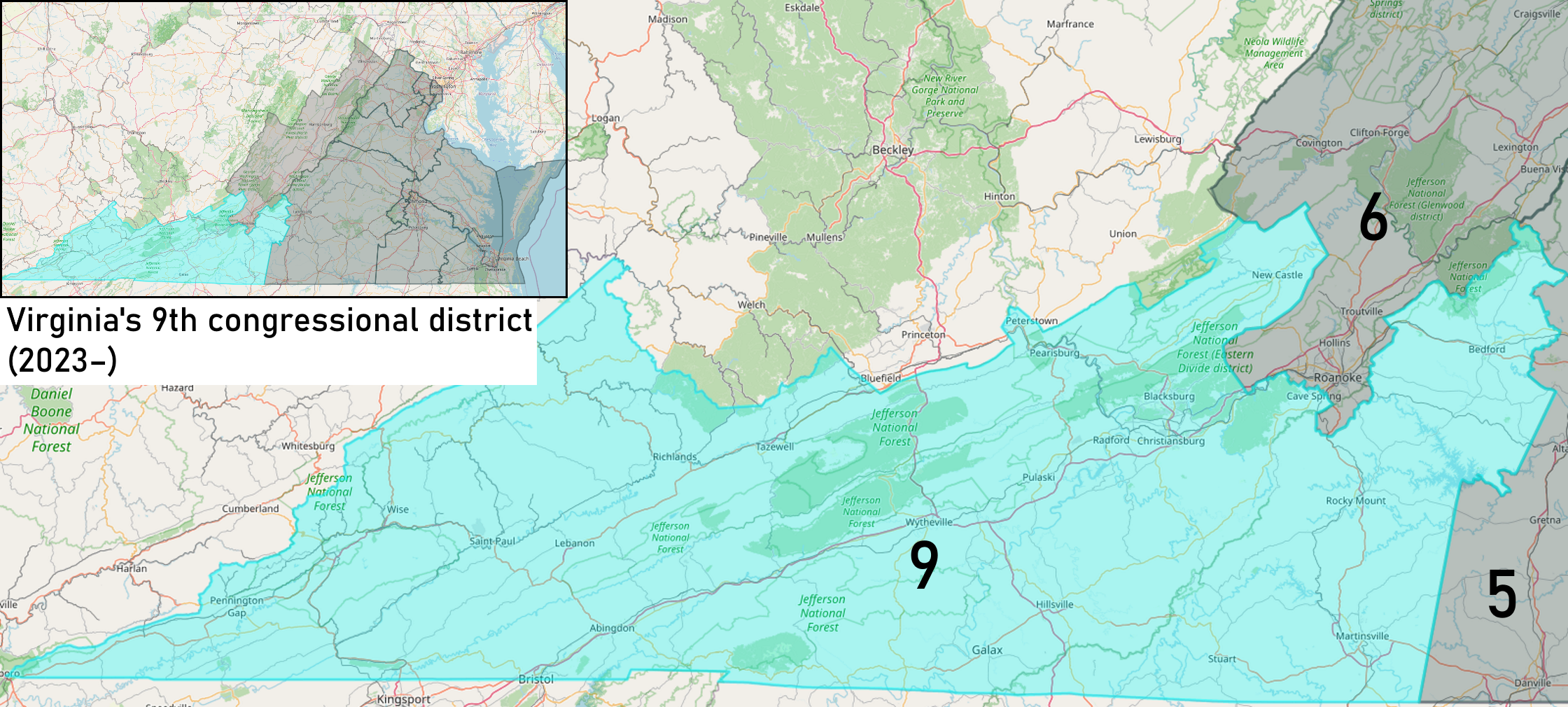
Virginia's 9th congressional district from January 3, 2023

Virginia's ninth congressional district is a United States congressional district in the Commonwealth of Virginia, covering much of the rural southwestern part of the state. The district includes the city of Salem, along with the towns of Abingdon and Blacksburg. It has been represented by Republican Morgan Griffith since 2011. Griffith took office after defeating 14-term incumbent Democrat Rick Boucher. With a Cook Partisan Voting Index rating of R+22, it is the most Republican district in Virginia.

The Ninth was the most competitive Virginia congressional district in the early 20th century, when the state was part of the Solid South. For twenty years (1903–1923), it was the only congressional district in Virginia — and one of the few in the entire former Confederacy – to be represented by a Republican. The district alternated between Democratic and Republican representation over the rest of the century. Some of the election results were so close – and questionable – that the district became known as "The Fighting Ninth."

Since the 1990s, the district has increasingly trended Republican in federal and state races, and it has taken over from the Shenandoah Valley-based Sixth as the most Republican district in the state. It last supported a Democrat for president in 1996, and has supported a Democrat in only two statewide contests since then.

The Ninth is the only district in Virginia that cast more votes for Hillary Clinton than Barack Obama in the 2008 Democratic Presidential Primary. Clinton won more than 60% of the vote, despite local Congressman Rick Boucher endorsing Obama. Republican presidential candidate John McCain received 59% of the vote in the 9th district in the 2008 General Election, however, his best performance in any of Virginia's eleven congressional districts. Voters in the 9th district supported McCain over Obama in the general election, despite reelecting Democratic Congressman Rick Boucher. In the 2010 midterm elections, in which Democrats lost their majority in Congress, Virginia State Delegate Morgan Griffith unseated Congressman Boucher by aligning Boucher with President Barack Obama and Speaker Nancy Pelosi, both unpopular figures in the district at the time. Boucher's support for the American Clean Energy and Security Act, or Cap and Trade was unpopular in the district. Since then, the district has not supported a Democrat in a statewide or federal election.

The district includes the entireties of the following counties: Bland, Buchanan, Carroll, Craig, Dickenson, Floyd, Franklin, Giles, Grayson, Henry, Lee, Montgomery, Patrick, Pulaski, Russell, Scott, Smyth, Tazewell, Washington, Wise, and Wythe, along with parts of Bedford and Roanoke counties. It also encompasses the independent cities of Bristol, Galax, Martinsville, Norton, and Radford.

== Recent election results from statewide races ==
Year	Office	Results
2008	President	McCain 59% - 39%
2008	Senate	Warner 62% - 36%
2009	Governor	McDonnell 67% - 32%
2009	Lt. Governor	Bolling 67% - 33%
2009	Attorney General	Cuccinelli 67% - 33%
2012	President	Romney 63% - 34%
2012	Senate	Allen 62% - 38%
2013	Governor	Cuccinelli 61% - 31%
2013	Lt. Governor	Jackson 61% - 39%
2013	Attorney General	Obenshain 67% - 32%
2014	Senate	Gillespie 60% - 37%
2016	President	Trump 68% - 27%
2017	Governor	Gillespie 68% - 31%
2017	Lt. Governor	Vogel 70% - 30%
2017	Attorney General	Donley Adams 69% - 31%
2018	Senate	Stewart 64% - 34%
2020	President	Trump 70% - 28%
2020	Senate	Gade 66% - 34%
2021	Governor	Youngkin 75% - 25%
2021	Lt. Governor	Earle-Sears 74% - 26%
2021	Attorney General	Miyares 74% - 26%
2024	President	Trump 71% - 27%
2024	Senate	Cao 67% - 33%
2025	Governor	Earle-Sears 68% - 32%
2025	Lt. Governor	Reid 69% - 30%
2025	Attorney General	Miyares 72% - 28%

== Composition ==
For the 118th and successive Congresses (based on redistricting following the 2020 census), the district contains all or portions of the following counties and communities:

Bedford County (5)

Bedford, Big Island, Moneta, Montvale, Stewartsville

Bland County (4)

All 4 communities

Buchanan County (4)

All 4 communities

Carroll County (5)

All 5 communities

Craig County (1)

New Castle

Dickenson County (4)

All 4 communities

Floyd County (1)

Floyd

Franklin County (8)

All 8 communities

Giles County (6)

All 6 communities

Grayson County (6)

All 6 communities

Henry County (11)

All 11 communities

Lee County (8)

All 8 communities

Montgomery County (10)

All 10 communities

Patrick County (3)

All 3 communities

Pulaski County (10)

All 10 communities

Roanoke County (2)

Cave Spring, Lafayette

Russell County (7)

All 7 communities

Scott County (7)

All 7 communities

Smyth County (9)

All 9 communities

Tazewell County (16)

All 16 communities

Washington County (7)

All 7 communities

Wise County (14)

All 14 communities

Wythe County (6)

All 6 communities

Independent cities (5)

Bristol, Galax, Martinsville, Norton, Radford

== List of members representing the district ==
Representative	Party	Term	Cong- ress	Electoral history
District established March 4, 1789
Theodorick Bland (Prince George County)	Anti-Administration	March 4, 1789 – June 1, 1790	1st	Elected in 1789. Died.
Vacant		June 2, 1790 – December 6, 1790	1st	
William B. Giles (Amelia Courthouse)	Anti-Administration	December 7, 1790 – March 3, 1795	1st 2nd 3rd 4th 5th	Elected in July 1790 to finish Bland's term and seated December 7, 1790. Re-elected later in 1790. Re-elected in 1793. Re-elected in 1795. Re-elected in 1797. Resigned.
William B. Giles (Amelia Courthouse)	Democratic-Republican	March 4, 1795 – October 2, 1798	1st 2nd 3rd 4th 5th	Elected in July 1790 to finish Bland's term and seated December 7, 1790. Re-elected later in 1790. Re-elected in 1793. Re-elected in 1795. Re-elected in 1797. Resigned.
Vacant		October 3, 1798 – December 2, 1798	5th	
Joseph Eggleston (Egglestetton)	Democratic-Republican	December 3, 1798 – March 3, 1801	5th 6th	Elected to finish Giles's term. Re-elected in 1799. [data missing]
William B. Giles (Amelia Courthouse)	Democratic-Republican	March 4, 1801 – March 3, 1803	7th	Elected in 1801. Redistricted to the 16th district and retired.
Philip R. Thompson (Fairfax)	Democratic-Republican	March 4, 1803 – March 3, 1807	8th 9th	Redistricted from the 18th district and re-elected in 1803. Re-elected in 1805. Retired.
John Love (Alexandria)	Democratic-Republican	March 4, 1807 – March 3, 1811	10th 11th	Elected in 1807. Re-elected in 1809. Moved to the 7th district and lost re-election there.
Aylett Hawes (Woodville)	Democratic-Republican	March 4, 1811 – March 3, 1813	12th	Elected in 1811. Redistricted to the 10th district.
John P. Hungerford (Leedstown)	Democratic-Republican	March 4, 1813 – March 3, 1817	13th 14th	Elected in 1813. Re-elected in 1815. Lost re-election.
William L. Ball (Nuttsville)	Democratic-Republican	March 4, 1817 – March 3, 1823	15th 16th 17th	Elected in 1817. Re-elected in 1819. Re-elected in 1821. Redistricted to the 13th district.
Andrew Stevenson (Richmond)	Democratic-Republican	March 4, 1823 – March 3, 1825	18th 19th 20th 21st 22nd	Redistricted from the 23rd district and re-elected in 1823. Re-elected in 1825. Re-elected in 1827. Re-elected in 1829. Re-elected in 1831. Redistricted to the 11th congressional district
Andrew Stevenson (Richmond)	Jackson	March 4, 1825 – March 3, 1833	18th 19th 20th 21st 22nd	Redistricted from the 23rd district and re-elected in 1823. Re-elected in 1825. Re-elected in 1827. Re-elected in 1829. Re-elected in 1831. Redistricted to the 11th congressional district
William P. Taylor (Fredericksburg)	Anti-Jacksonian	March 4, 1833 – March 3, 1835	23rd	Elected in 1833. Lost re-election.
John Roane (Rumford Academy)	Jacksonian	March 4, 1835 – March 3, 1837	24th	Elected in 1835. Retired.
Robert M. T. Hunter (Lloyds)	Whig	March 4, 1837 – March 3, 1843	25th 26th 27th	Elected in 1837. Re-elected in 1839. Re-elected in 1841. Lost re-election.
Samuel Chilton (Warrenton)	Whig	March 4, 1843 – March 3, 1845	28th	Elected in 1843. Retired.
John S. Pendleton (Culpeper)	Whig	March 4, 1845 – March 3, 1849	29th 30th	Elected in 1845. Re-elected in 1847. Lost re-election.
Jeremiah Morton (Raccoon Ford)	Whig	March 4, 1849 – March 3, 1851	31st	Elected in 1849. Lost re-election.
James F. Strother (Rappahannock)	Whig	March 4, 1851 – March 3, 1853	32nd	Elected in 1851. Lost re-election.
John Letcher (Lexington)	Democratic	March 4, 1853 – March 3, 1859	33rd 34th 35th	Elected in 1853. Re-elected in 1855. Re-elected in 1857. Retired to run for Governor of Virginia.
John T. Harris (Harrisonburg)	Independent Democratic	March 4, 1859 – March 3, 1861	36th	Elected in 1859. Retired.
District inactive		March 4, 1861 – June 19, 1863	37th 38th	Civil War
District moved to West Virginia June 20, 1863
District re-established March 4, 1873
Rees T. Bowen (Maiden Spring)	Democratic	March 4, 1873 – March 3, 1875	43rd	Elected in 1872. Retired.
William Terry (Wytheville)	Democratic	March 4, 1875 – March 3, 1877	44th	Elected in 1874. Lost re-election.
Auburn L. Pridemore (Jonesville)	Democratic	March 4, 1877 – March 3, 1879	45th	Elected in 1876. Lost re-election.
James B. Richmond (Estillville)	Democratic	March 4, 1879 – March 3, 1881	46th	Elected in 1878. Lost re-election.
Abram Fulkerson (Bristol)	Democratic	March 4, 1881 – March 3, 1883	47th	Elected in 1880. Retired.
Henry Bowen (Tazewell)	Readjuster	March 4, 1883 – March 3, 1885	48th	Elected in 1882. Lost re-election.
Connally F. Trigg (Abingdon)	Democratic	March 4, 1885 – March 3, 1887	49th	Elected in 1884. Lost re-election.
Henry Bowen (Tazewell)	Republican	March 4, 1887 – March 3, 1889	50th	Elected in 1886. Lost re-election.
John A. Buchanan (Abingdon)	Democratic	March 4, 1889 – March 3, 1893	51st 52nd	Elected in 1888. Re-elected in 1890. Retired.
James W. Marshall (New Castle)	Democratic	March 4, 1893 – March 3, 1895	53rd	Elected in 1892. Lost re-election.
James A. Walker (Wytheville)	Republican	March 4, 1895 – March 3, 1899	54th 55th	Elected in 1894. Re-elected in 1896. Lost re-election.
William F. Rhea (Bristol)	Democratic	March 4, 1899 – March 3, 1903	56th 57th	Elected in 1898. Re-elected in 1900. Lost re-election.
Campbell Slemp (Big Stone Gap)	Republican	March 4, 1903 – October 13, 1907	58th 59th 60th	Elected in 1902. Re-elected in 1904. Re-elected in 1906. Died.
Vacant		October 14, 1907 – December 16, 1907	60th	
C. Bascom Slemp (Big Stone Gap)	Republican	December 17, 1907 – March 3, 1923	60th 61st 62nd 63rd 64th 65th 66th 67th	Elected to finish Slemp's term. Re-elected in 1908. Re-elected in 1910. Re-elected in 1912. Re-elected in 1914. Re-elected in 1916. Re-elected in 1918. Re-elected in 1920. Retired.
George C. Peery (Tazewell)	Democratic	March 4, 1923 – March 3, 1929	68th 69th 70th	Elected in 1922. Re-elected in 1924. Re-elected in 1926. Retired.
Joseph C. Shaffer (Wytheville)	Republican	March 4, 1929 – March 3, 1931	71st	Elected in 1928. Lost re-election.
John W. Flannagan Jr. (Bristol)	Democratic	March 4, 1931 – March 3, 1933	72nd	Elected in 1930. Redistricted to at-large seat.
District inactive		March 4, 1933 – January 3, 1935	73rd	
John W. Flannagan Jr. (Bristol)	Democratic	January 3, 1935 – January 3, 1949	74th 75th 76th 77th 78th 79th 80th	Redistricted from at-large seat and re-elected in 1934. Re-elected in 1936. Re-elected in 1938. Re-elected in 1940. Re-elected in 1942. Re-elected in 1944. Re-elected in 1946. Retired.
Thomas B. Fugate (Ewing)	Democratic	January 3, 1949 – January 3, 1953	81st 82nd	Elected in 1948. Re-elected in 1950. Retired.
William C. Wampler (Bristol)	Republican	January 3, 1953 – January 3, 1955	83rd	Elected in 1952. Lost re-election.
W. Pat Jennings (Marion)	Democratic	January 3, 1955 – January 3, 1967	84th 85th 86th 87th 88th 89th	Elected in 1954. Re-elected in 1956. Re-elected in 1958. Re-elected in 1960. Re-elected in 1962. Re-elected in 1964. Lost re-election.
William C. Wampler (Bristol)	Republican	January 3, 1967 – January 3, 1983	90th 91st 92nd 93rd 94th 95th 96th 97th	Elected in 1966. Re-elected in 1968. Re-elected in 1970. Re-elected in 1972. Re-elected in 1974. Re-elected in 1976. Re-elected in 1978. Re-elected in 1980. Lost re-election.
Frederick C. Boucher (Abingdon)	Democratic	January 3, 1983 – January 3, 2011	98th 99th 100th 101st 102nd 103rd 104th 105th 106th 107th 108th 109th 110th 111th	Elected in 1982. Re-elected in 1984. Re-elected in 1986. Re-elected in 1988. Re-elected in 1990. Re-elected in 1992. Re-elected in 1994. Re-elected in 1996. Re-elected in 1998. Re-elected in 2000. Re-elected in 2002. Re-elected in 2004. Re-elected in 2006. Re-elected in 2008. Lost re-election.
Morgan Griffith (Salem)	Republican	January 3, 2011 – present	112th 113th 114th 115th 116th 117th 118th 119th	Elected in 2010. Re-elected in 2012. Re-elected in 2014. Re-elected in 2016. Re-elected in 2018. Re-elected in 2020. Re-elected in 2022. Re-elected in 2024. Re-elected in 2026.

== Recent election results ==
=== 2000 ===
2000 United States House of Representatives elections in Virginia
Party	Candidate	Votes	%
Democratic	Rick Boucher	137,488	69.80
Republican	Michael Osborne	59,335	30.1
Total votes		196,855	100.00
Democratic hold			

=== 2002 ===
2002 United States House of Representatives elections in Virginia
Party	Candidate	Votes	%
Democratic	Rick Boucher (inc.)	100,075	65.76
Republican	Jay Katzen (write-in)	52,076	34.22
Write-ins		32	0.02
Total votes		152,183	100.00
Democratic hold			

=== 2004 ===
2004 United States House of Representatives elections in Virginia
Party	Candidate	Votes	%
Democratic	Rick Boucher (inc.)	150,039	59.32
Republican	Kevin R. Triplett	98,499	38.94
Independent	Seth A. Davis	4,341	1.72
Write-ins		68	0.03
Total votes		252,947	100.00
Democratic hold			

=== 2006 ===
2006 United States House of Representatives elections in Virginia
Party	Candidate	Votes	%
Democratic	Rick Boucher (incumbent)	129,705	67.76
Republican	Bill Carrico	61,574	32.17
Write-ins		136	0.07
Total votes		191,415	100.00
Democratic hold			

=== 2008 ===
2008 United States House of Representatives elections in Virginia
Party	Candidate	Votes	%
Democratic	Rick Boucher (incumbent)	207,306	97.07
Write-ins		6,264	2.93
Total votes		213,570	100.00
Democratic hold			

=== 2010 ===
2010 United States House of Representatives elections in Virginia
Party	Candidate	Votes	%
Republican	Morgan Griffith	95,726	51.21
Democratic	Rick Boucher (incumbent)	86,743	46.41
Independent	Jeremiah Heaton	4,282	2.29
Write-in		166	0.09
Total votes		186,917	100
Republican gain from Democratic			

=== 2012 ===
2012 United States House of Representatives elections in Virginia
Party	Candidate	Votes	%
Republican	Morgan Griffith (inc.)	184,882	61.29
Democratic	Anthony Flaccavento	116,400	38.59
Write-in		376	0.12
Total votes		301,658	100
Republican hold			

=== 2014 ===
2014 United States House of Representatives elections in Virginia
Party	Candidate	Votes	%
Republican	Morgan Griffith (incumbent)	117,465	72.1
Independent	William Carr	39,412	24.2
n/a	Write-ins	5,940	3.7
Total votes		162,817	100.0
Republican hold			

=== 2016 ===
2016 United States House of Representatives elections in Virginia
Party	Candidate	Votes	%
Republican	Morgan Griffith (incumbent)	212,838	68.6
Democratic	Derek Kitts	87,877	28.3
Independent	Janice Boyd	9,050	2.9
n/a	Write-ins	549	0.2
Total votes		310,314	100.0
Republican hold			

=== 2018 ===
2018 United States House of Representatives elections in Virginia
Party	Candidate	Votes	%
Republican	Morgan Griffith (incumbent)	160,933	65.2
Democratic	Anthony Flaccavento	85,833	34.7
n/a	Write-ins	214	0.1
Total votes		246,980	100.0
Republican hold			

=== 2020 ===
2020 United States House of Representatives elections in Virginia
Party	Candidate	Votes	%
Republican	Morgan Griffith (incumbent)	271,851	94.0
Write-in		17,423	6.0
Total votes		289,274	100.0
Republican hold			

=== 2022 ===
2022 United States House of Representatives elections in Virginia
Party	Candidate	Votes	%
Republican	Morgan Griffith (incumbent)	182,207	73.2
Democratic	Taysha DeVaughan	66,027	26.5
Write-in		558	0.2
Total votes		248,792	100.0
Republican hold			

=== 2024 ===
2024 Virginia's 9th congressional district election
Party	Candidate	Votes	%
Republican	Morgan Griffith (incumbent)	290,645	72.5
Democratic	Karen Baker	109,570	27.3
Write-in		748	0.2
Total votes		400,963	100.0
Republican hold			

== Historical district boundaries ==
The Virginia Ninth District started in 1788 covering the counties of Brunswick, Sussex, Greensville, Prince George, Dinwiddie, Mecklenburg, Lunenburg, Ameila, Cumberland and Powhatan.

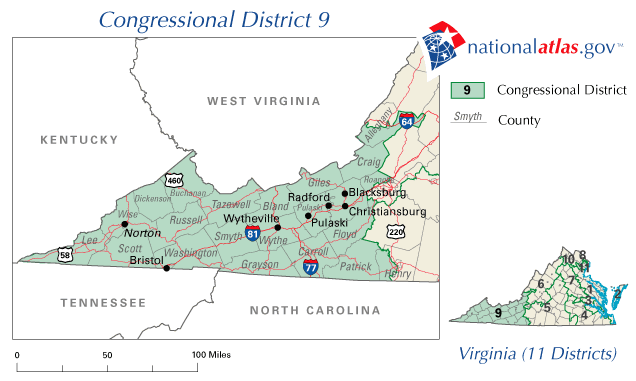
2003–2013

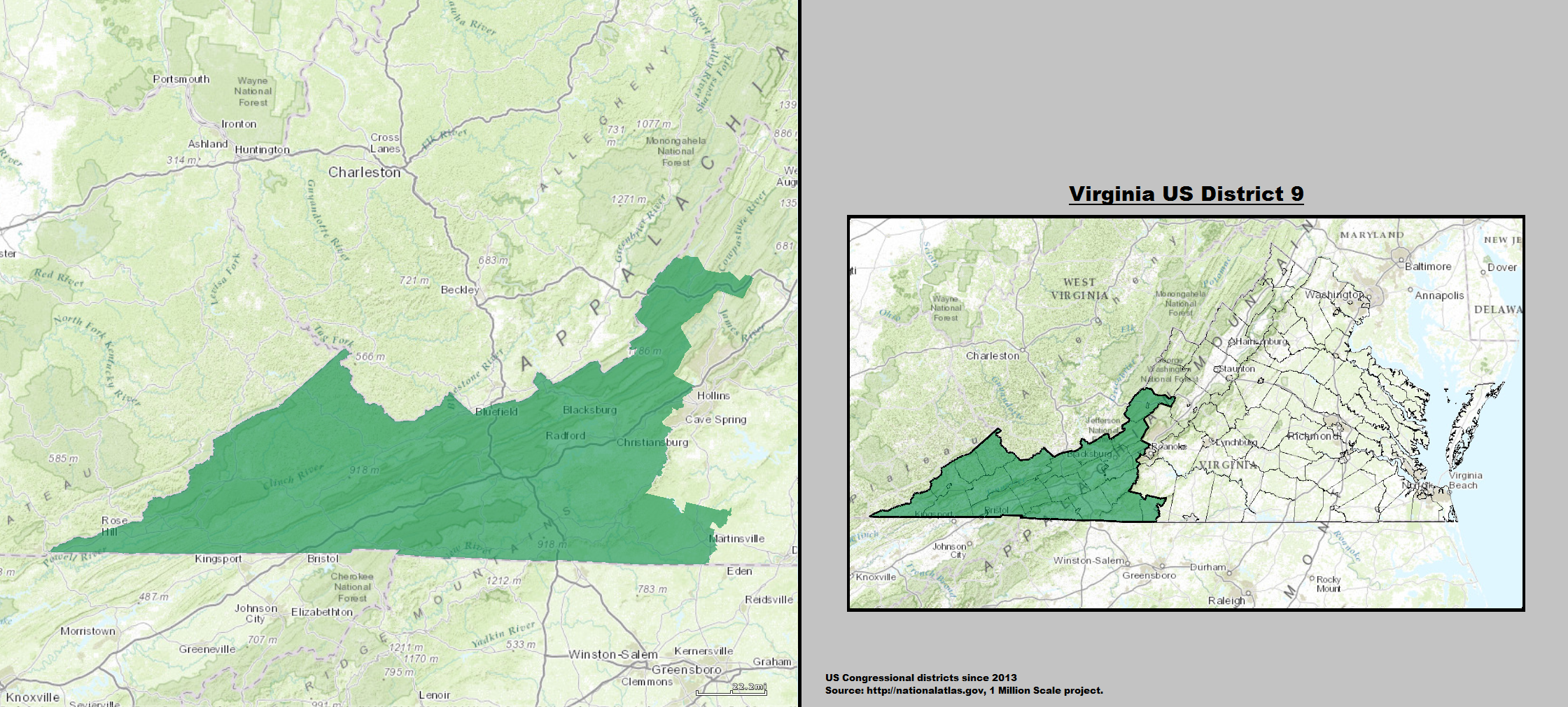
2013–2023

== See also ==
- Virginia's congressional districts
- List of United States congressional districts
