= Connally Findlay Trigg (politician) =

American politician

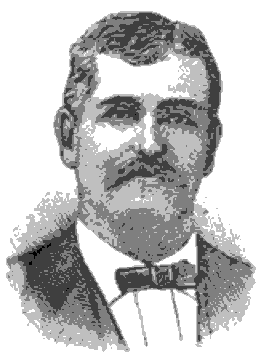

Member of the U.S. House of Representatives from Virginia's 9th district
- In office March 4, 1885 – March 3, 1887
- Preceded by: Henry Bowen
- Succeeded by: Henry Bowen

Personal details
- Born: September 18, 1847 Abingdon, Washington County, Virginia
- Died: April 23, 1907 (aged 59) Washington County, Virginia
- Party: Democratic

Connally Findlay Trigg (September 18, 1847 – April 23, 1907) was a Virginia lawyer and former Confederate soldier who served as a United States Congressman from Virginia (1885-1887).

== Early life and education ==
Born in Abingdon, the county seat of Washington County, Virginia, the third son born to the former Anna Munford Tomkins (1816-1888) and her physician husband, Dr. Daniel Trigg (1808-1853). His parents had ten children, of whom half lived during census years, including three elder and a younger brother and Ann, the eldest daughter and nearly a decade older than this boy. Trigg may have been named for a Unionist lawyer uncle Connally F. Trigg (1810-1880) who served in the 1850 Virginia Constitutional Convention and helped build a new courthouse in Abingdon, but moved to Tennessee in 1856 where he became a U.S. District judge. Since Virginia had no public schools, this boy was educated appropriately for his class. After the conflict, he studied law. Before this boy was born, Dr. Daniel Trigg owned seven enslaved people in the 1840 census (mostly female), but does not appear in the 1850 slave census. His mother, Anna Munford Tompkins, was of the First Families of Virginia, descended from William Byrd of Westover and Robert "King" Carter which made Trigg a cousin of General Robert E. Lee. She appeared in the 1860 census as owning two enslaved women (aged 30 and 35) and four enslaved girls (aged between 1 and 10 years old), as well as having a mulatto boy (free) in the household.

== Career ==
During the Civil War, in 1864 Trigg enlisted as a private in the First Virginia Cavalry, a unit in which his older brother Thomas K. Trigg (who in August 1861 had enlisted in the 37th Virginia Infantry) had transferred, but would himself transfer to the Confederate States Navy and served on the CSS "Leasing" in 1865 before becoming involved in Confederate organizations after the war.

After the war, Trigg studied law, was admitted to the Virginia bar in Abingdon in 1870, and two years later was elected Commonwealth attorney for Washington County, which position he held until resigning in 1884 to become run for Congress. He was elected as a Democrat to the Forty-ninth Congress (March 4, 1885, to March 3, 1887). Trigg then resumed his legal practice.

== Personal life ==
In 1870 Trigg married Pocahontas Anne Robertson (1847-1923), youngest daughter of former acting governor Wyndham Robertson of Chesterfield County, Virginia, and whose brother CSA Pvt. Wyndham Robertson died in 1863, but whose brother CSA Lt. Frank Robertson survived the conflict and lived in Abingdon. However, the couple had no children.

== Death and legacy ==
Trigg died in Abingdon on April 23, 1907, and was buried in Sinking Spring Cemetery.

U.S. House of Representatives
| Preceded by Henry Bowen | U.S. Congress, Virginia's 9th District; March 4, 1885-March 3, 1887 | Succeeded by Henry Bowen |
