= Henry Bowen =

American politician (1841–1915)

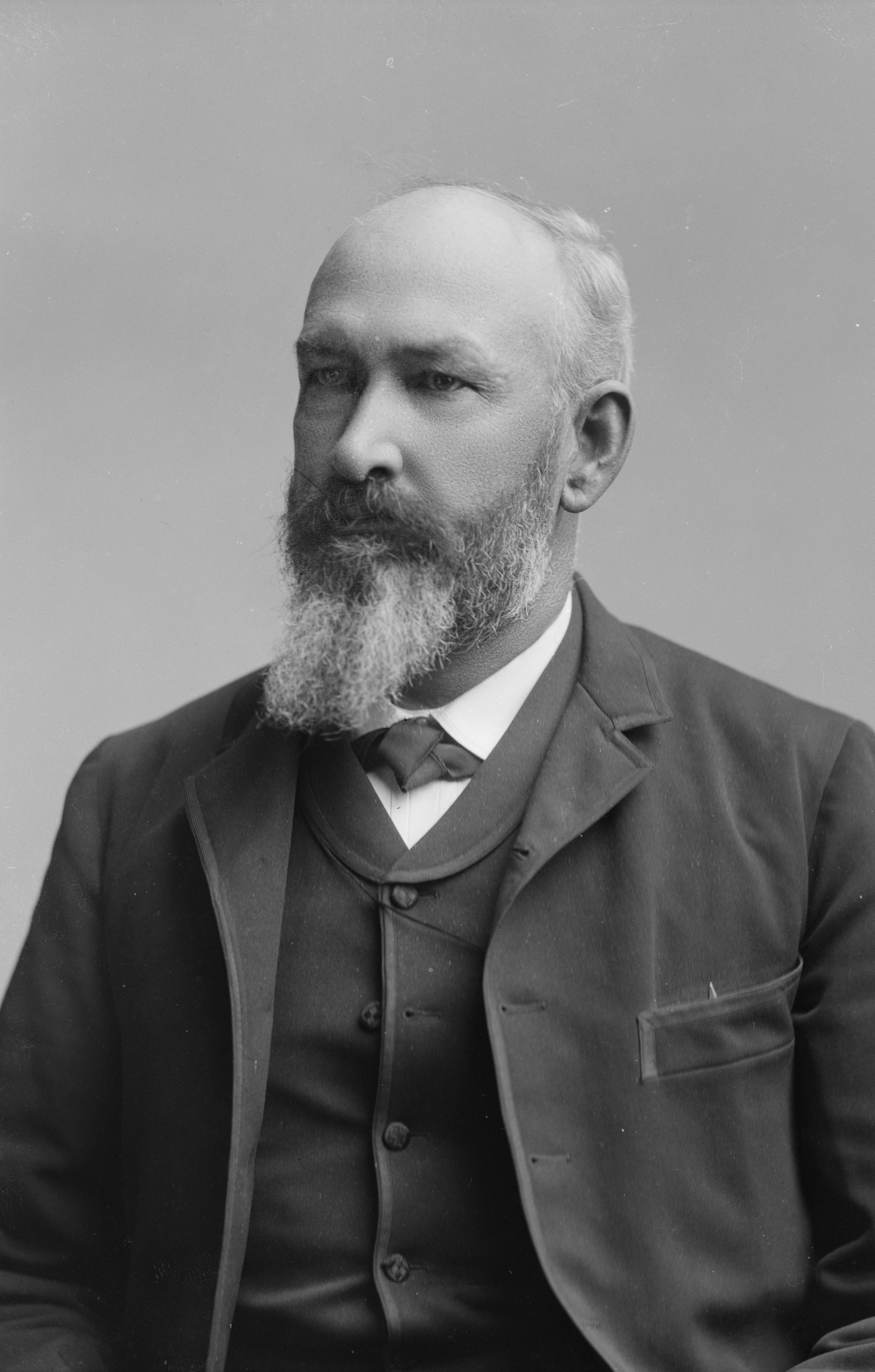
- Portrait by C. M. Bell c. 1883–1889

Member of the U.S. House of Representatives from Virginia's 9th district
- In office March 4, 1887 – March 3, 1889
- Preceded by: Connally Findlay Trigg
- Succeeded by: John A. Buchanan
- In office March 4, 1883 – March 3, 1885
- Preceded by: Abram Fulkerson
- Succeeded by: Connally Findlay Trigg

Personal details
- Born: Henry Bowen; December 26, 1841 Tazewell County, Virginia, U.S.
- Died: April 20, 1915 (aged 73) Tazewell, Virginia, U.S.
- Resting place: Jeffersonville Cemetery; 37°07′18″N 81°30′35″W
- Party: Readjuster (1883–1885); Republican (1887–1889)
- Parent: Rees Bowen (father)
- Relatives: John Warfield Johnston (uncle)
- Education: Emory and Henry College

Military service
- Allegiance: Confederate States
- Branch/service: Confederate States Army
- Years of service: 1861–1864
- Rank: Captain
- Unit: 8th Virginia Cavalry
- Battles/wars: American Civil War

Henry Bowen (December 26, 1841 – April 29, 1915) was a Virginia lawyer, soldier and politician from Tazewell County, Virginia. After raising a unit which became the 22nd Virginia Cavalry, he fought for the Confederate States of America during the American Civil War, after which Bowen served in the Virginia House of Delegates, as well as the U.S. House of Representatives, first as a Readjuster, then as a Republican.

== Family and early life ==
Born at "Maiden Spring," near Tazewell, Tazewell County, Virginia, Bowen was the son of Democratic Congressman Rees Bowen, nephew of Senator John Warfield Johnston (a postwar member of the Conservative Party of Virginia, and cousin of Tennessee's last Whig governor William Bowen Campbell. After a private education suitable to his class, he attended Emory and Henry College in Emory, Virginia.

== Confederate captain ==
Bowen farmed, then entered the Confederate Army in 1861 as a captain in Company H of the 8th Virginia Cavalry, which fought with Payne's brigade, Lee's division, Army of Northern Virginia. On December 21, 1864, Sheridan's cavalry captured Capt. Bowen at Lacy Springs, Virginia. Upon being paroled on June 19, 1865, Bowen returned to his native county and resumed farming.

== Political career ==
Bowen was elected and re-elected as one of Tazewell County's representatives in the Virginia House of Delegates from 1869 to 1873. In 1883, he was elected as a Readjuster to the Forty-eighth Congress, serving from March 4, 1883 to March 3, 1885. Bowen failed to win renomination in 1884. He was elected as a Republican to the Fiftieth Congress, serving from March 4, 1887 to March 3, 1889. He was an unsuccessful candidate for reelection in 1888 to the Fifty-first Congress.

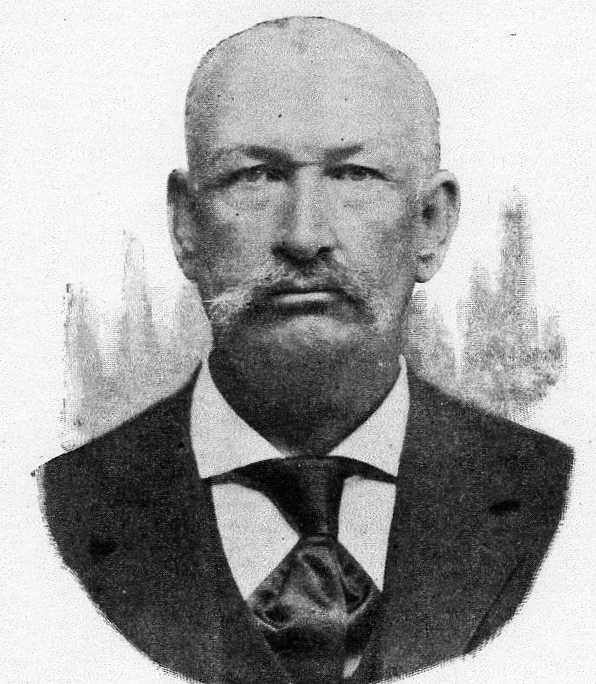
Bowen later in life

In 1892, he was a delegate to the Republican National Convention. He returned to his farm and raised livestock in Tazewell County, Virginia.

== Death and legacy ==
Bowen died at his home, "Maiden Spring", in Tazewell County, April 29, 1915, and was buried in Jeffersonville Cemetery, Tazewell, Virginia.

U.S. House of Representatives
Preceded by Abram Fulkerson	Member of the U.S. House of Representatives from Virginia's 9th congressional district 1883–1885	Succeeded by Connally Findlay Trigg
Preceded by Connally Findlay Trigg	Member of the U.S. House of Representatives from Virginia's 9th congressional district 1887–1889	Succeeded by John A. Buchanan
