= James W. Marshall (politician) =

American politician and lawyer

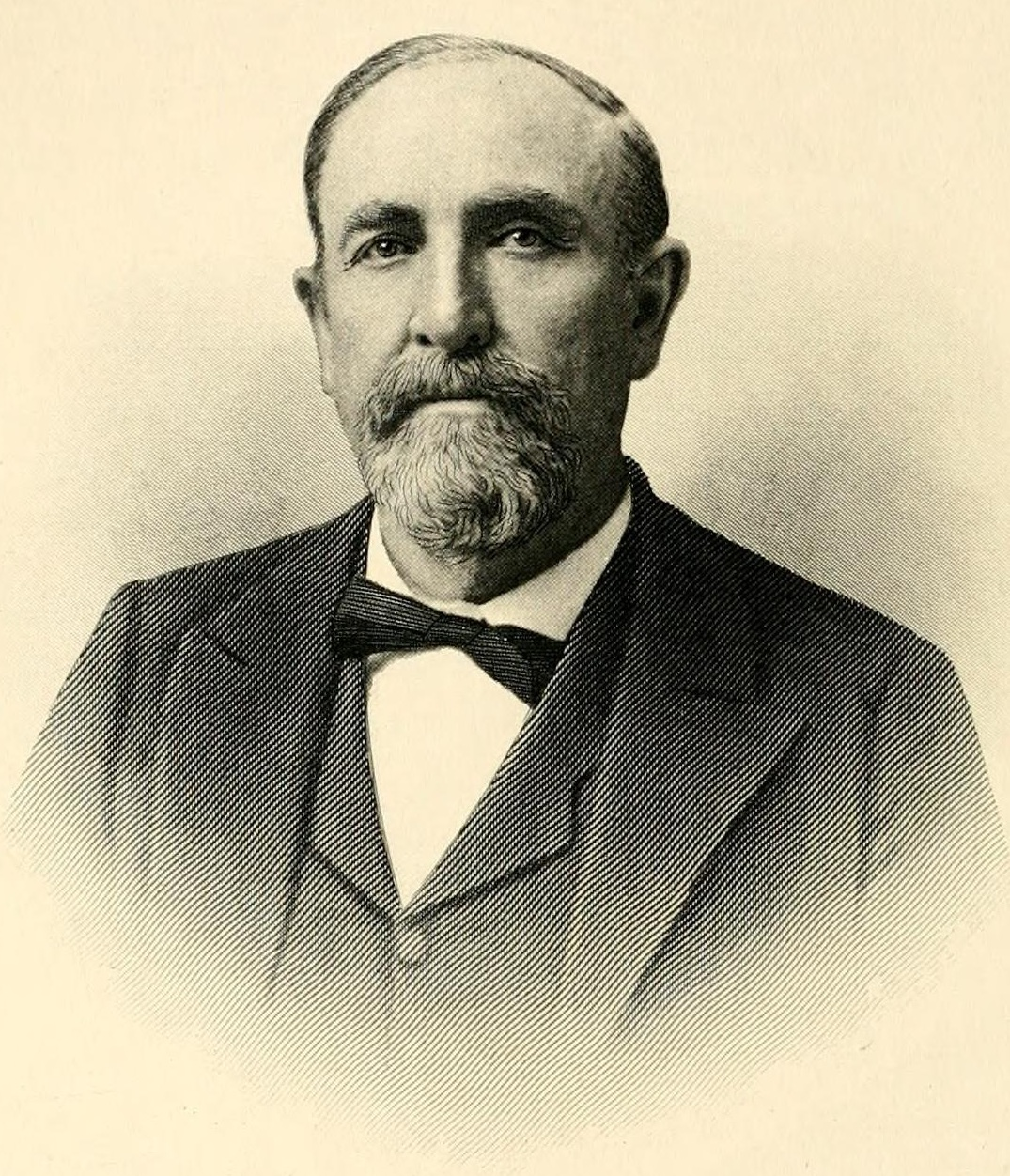
- From Volume V of 1906's Men of Mark In Virginia

Member of the United States House of Representatives
- In office March 4, 1893 – March 3, 1895
- Preceded by: John A. Buchanan
- Succeeded by: James A. Walker
- Constituency: Virginia's 9th congressional district

Personal details
- Born: March 1, 1844 Staunton, Virginia, US
- Died: November 27, 1911 (aged 67) New Castle, Virginia, US
- Resting place: West View Cemetery, New Castle, Virginia, US
- Party: Democratic
- Education: Roanoke College
- Profession: Attorney

James William Marshall (March 31, 1844 – November 27, 1911) served as a member of the United States House of Representatives from Virginia.

== Biography ==
Marshall was born near Staunton, Virginia, in Augusta County.

He served during the Civil War in the Confederate Army as a private for four years.

After the War, he graduated in 1870 from Roanoke College in Salem, Virginia. He studied law and was admitted to the bar, serving Commonwealth's attorney for Craig County, Virginia in the years 1870–1875 and 1884–1888.

Marshall served in the Senate of Virginia during the years 1875–1878 and 1891–1892, and was a member of the Virginia House of Delegates in 1883 and 1884.

Marshall elected as a Democrat to the Fifty-third Congress (March 4, 1893 – March 3, 1895). He was an unsuccessful candidate for renomination in 1894. He resumed the practice of law in New Castle, Virginia. He was a delegate to the Virginia Constitutional Convention of 1901-1902.

He died in New Castle, and was interred in West View Cemetery.

== Notes ==
U.S. House of Representatives
Preceded by John A. Buchanan	Member of the U.S. House of Representatives from Virginia's 9th congressional district 1893–1895	Succeeded by James A. Walker
