= William Saunders Crowdy =

American soldier, preacher, entrepreneur and pastor (1847–1908)

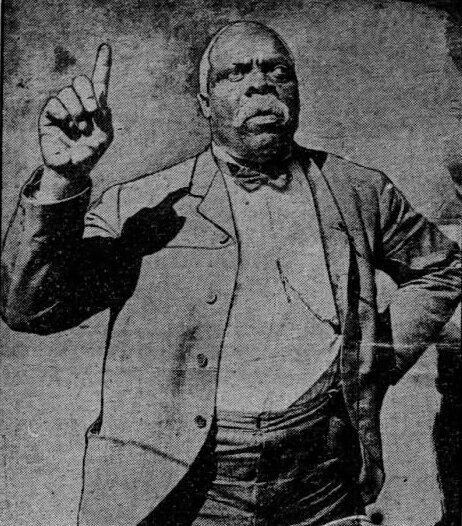
- Prophet Crowdy, the central illustration of "This Coal-Black Dowie Says Earth Is Square," an article by William T. Ellis, syndicated in multiple newspapers, 1907
- Born: Wilson Saunders Crowdy; August 11, 1847; Charlotte Hall, Maryland, U.S.
- Died: August 4, 1908 (aged 60); Newark, New Jersey, U.S.
- Resting place: Triangle Cemetery, Suffolk, Virginia
- Occupations: Religious leader Soldier
- Organization: Church of God and Saints of Christ
- Movement: Black Hebrew Israelites
- Military career
- Branch: Union Army; United States Army
- Service years: 1863–1872
- Rank: Quartermaster Sergeant
- Unit: 5th Cavalry Regiment
- Conflicts: American Civil War: Battle of the Wilderness

William Saunders Crowdy (August 11, 1847 – August 4, 1908) was an American soldier, preacher, entrepreneur and pastor. He was also one of the earliest known Black Hebrew Israelites in the United States: he established the Church of God and Saints of Christ in 1896 after he claimed to have had visions telling him that "Blacks were descendants of the twelve lost tribes of Israel."

== Early life ==
In 1847, William Saunders Crowdy was born into slavery at the Chilsy Hills Farm, a plantation in Charlotte Hall, Maryland. His father was Basil Crowdy, a deeply religious man who oversaw the drying of clay for the plantation's brick kiln. His mother, Sarah Ann, was a cook, which often got her access to the "big house" despite her status as a slave. Crowdy was originally called "Wilson" by his overseer. Crowdy was born in a one-room slave cabin near the Patuxent River in the middle of a violent nighttime thunderstorm. Crowdy lived his early life in bondage working first by milking the plantation owner's cows. As he grew older he was assigned by the slave overseer to tend the plantation's melon patch, and then to work as a stable boy and tobacco drier.

Plantation life during the 19th Century was hard, Crowdy's overseer would punish slaves brutally. Despite it being illegal for slaves to read, Crowdy was a religious and caring man from a young age and learned about the Hebrew prophets, especially Elijah. According to oral history Crowdy was beaten by the slavemaster at age 7 for taking too much cornpone from the ration cook to feed his sister. He spent the night locked in a barn for punishment but prayed to Moses to be released from bondage of his captors. Ten years to the day later, in 1863, at age 17, Crowdy escaped from his master after an argument.

Crowdy shed the name Wilson, regarding it as a slave name, and became William, which he then used to enlist in the Union Army. He immediately took a job as quartermaster's cook. He joined the United States Colored Troops 19th Regiment of Maryland along with his half-brother Daniel.

== Military career ==
Crowdy's unit was raised at Benedict, Maryland on December 19, 1863, when the United States Government offered compensation to his enslavers for his freedom to fight. During the Civil War, the 19th Regiment USCT fought at the Battle of the Wilderness in 1864. Crowdy served as a laborer and supply storeman, and participated in the capture of a Confederate flour wagon being smuggled into Petersburg, Virginia during the siege of Richmond. Crowdy remained in the Army after the war to become a Buffalo Soldier. He was promoted to quartermaster sergeant in the 5th Cavalry in 1867, receiving his discharge in 1872. He later became a cook on the Santa Fe railroad.

== Religious life ==
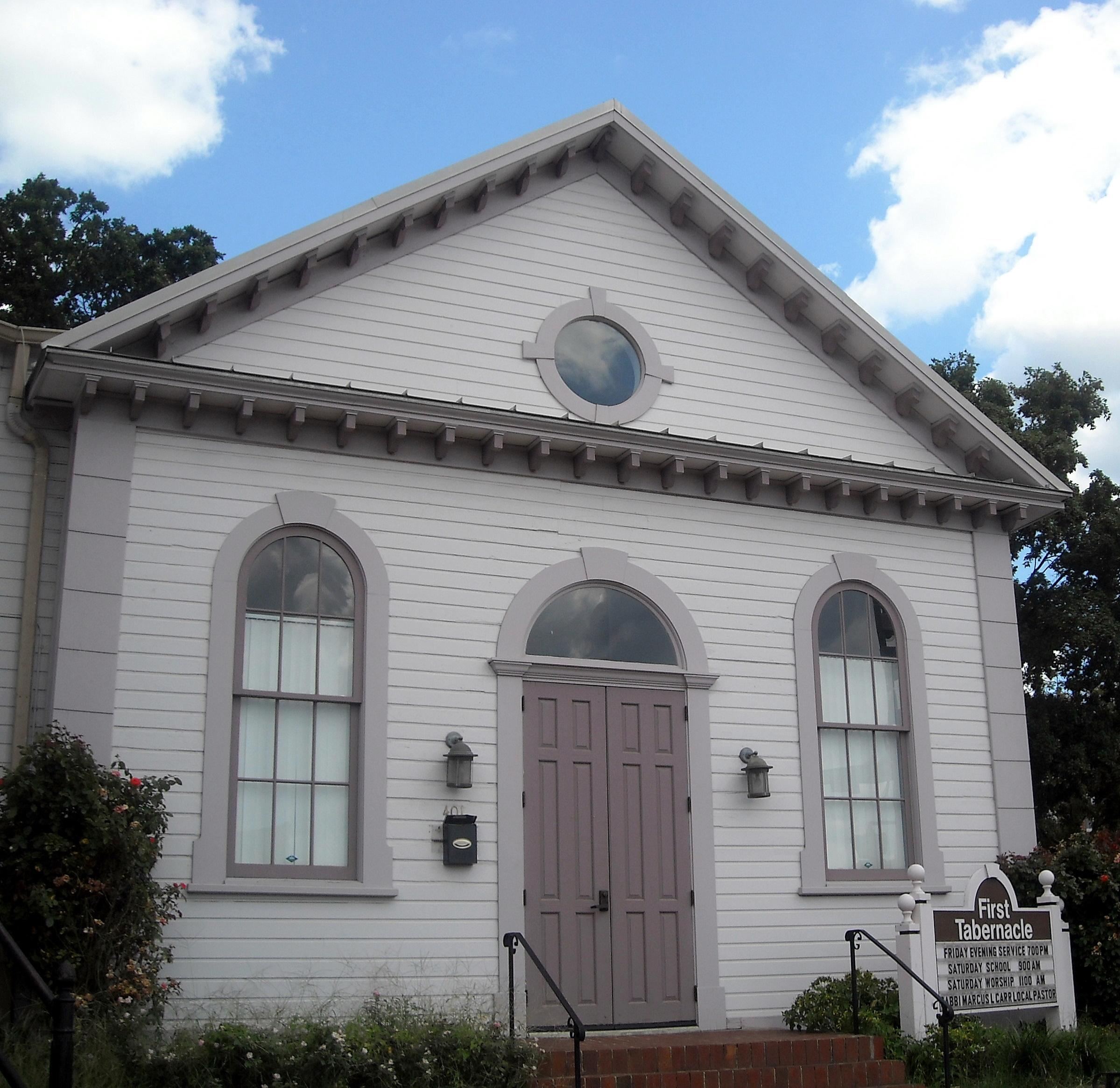
Former Washington, D.C. headquarters of the Church of God and Saints of Christ during Crowdy's leadership. The building is now known as First Tabernacle Beth El and is listed on the National Register of Historic Places.

Crowdy settled in Guthrie, Oklahoma after his retirement from the railroad. He became a deacon in the local Baptist Church and an active member of the Prince Hall Freemasons.

In 1893, Crowdy's behaviour became "strange"; for example, he was not always aware of people talking to him "but would sit staring for long periods of time." He claimed to have had several visions in which he was told "that Black people were descendants of the twelve lost tribes of Israel." He proceeded to create the Church of God and Saints of Christ and is regarded as a founder of the Black Hebrew Israelite movement.

He started preaching in Guthrie, and then set up Tabernacles in Emporia and Lawrence, Kansas in 1896. He was arrested 22 times. After setting up another Tabernacle in Topeka, he spread his creed in Sedalia, Missouri, Chicago, and several cities in New York, establishing an Elder-in-Charge in each city before moving to the next.

In 1903, he bought 40 acres (160,000 m^{2}) of land in Suffolk, Virginia, calling it "Canaan Land". More land was subsequently purchased by Bishop William H. Plummer and this is now the international headquarters of the denomination. In 1905 he sent missionaries to South Africa and by 1906 he declared Chief Joseph W. Crowdy, Bishop William H. Plummer, and Elder Calvin S. Skinner as future leaders of his congregation.

Shais Rishon, a Black Orthodox Jewish writer and activist, has claimed that Crowdy was "a southern baptist who never belonged nor converted to any branch of Judaism."

== Death ==
William Saunders Crowdy died on August 4, 1908, aged 60, in Newark, New Jersey and was buried in Newark. His body was later exhumed and buried in Belleville, Virginia.
