= Rees Bowen =

American politician

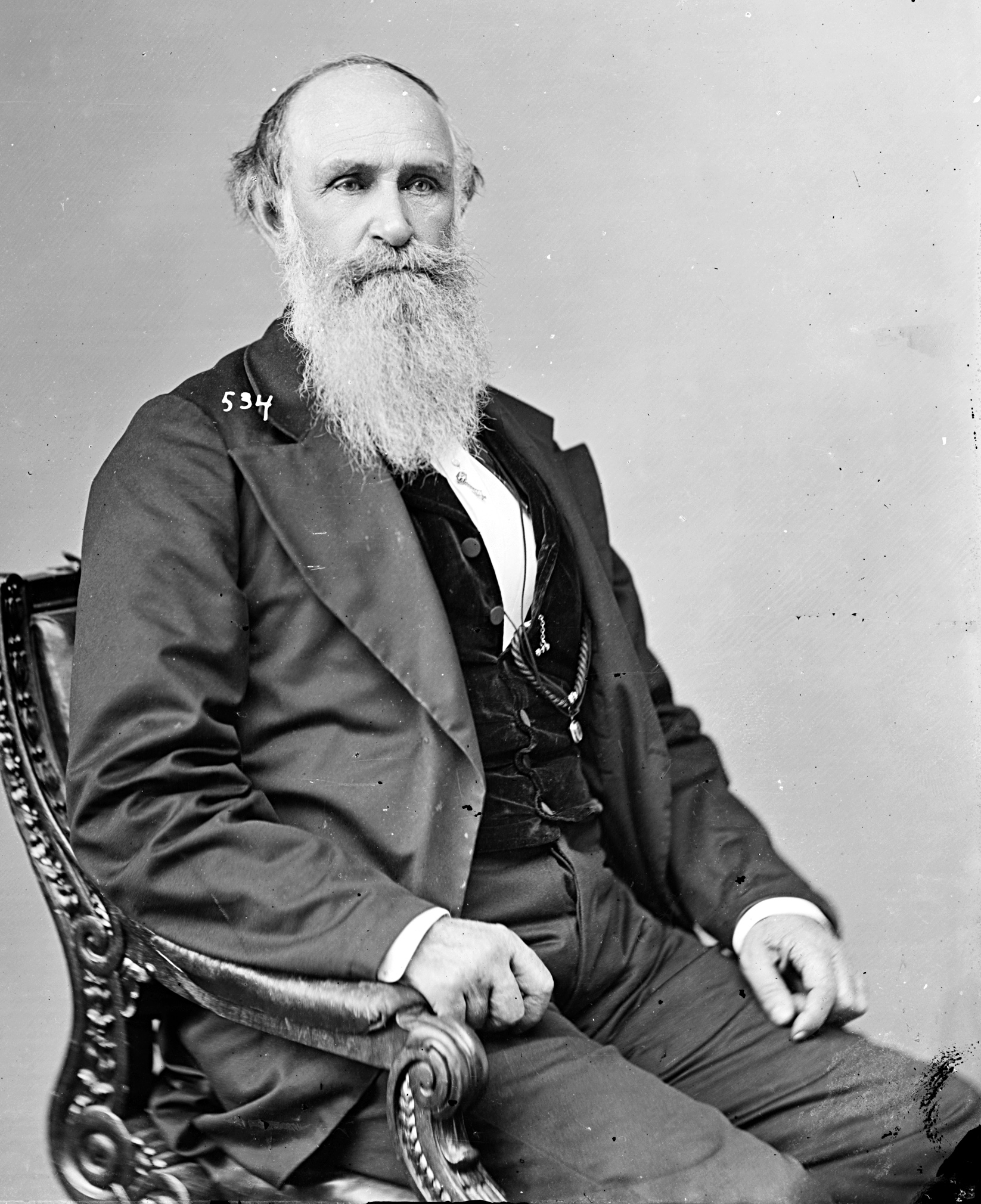

Member of the U.S. House of Representatives from Virginia's 9th district
- In office March 4, 1873 – March 3, 1875
- Preceded by: John T. Harris
- Succeeded by: William Terry

Member of the Virginia House of Delegates for Tazewell, McDowell, and Buchanan
- In office September 7, 1863 – December 4, 1865
- Preceded by: Thomas H. Gillespie
- Succeeded by: G. W. Deskins

Personal details
- Born: Rees Tate Bowen; January 10, 1809 Tazewell, Virginia, U.S.
- Died: August 29, 1879 (aged 70) Tazewell, Virginia, U.S.
- Party: Democratic
- Spouse: Marie Louisa Peery
- Children: Henry Bowen

Rees Tate Bowen (January 10, 1809 – August 29, 1879) was a nineteenth-century American congressman, magistrate and judge from Virginia. He was the father of Henry Bowen.

== Biography ==
Born at "Maiden Spring" near Tazewell, Virginia, Bowen attended Abingdon Academy and later engaged in agricultural pursuits. He was appointed a brigadier general in the Virginia Militia by Governor Henry A. Wise in 1856 and served in the Virginia House of Delegates from 1863 to 1865. Bowen was magistrate of Tazewell County, Virginia, for several years prior to the Civil War and was presiding judge of the county court a portion of that time. He was elected as a Democrat to the United States House of Representatives in 1872, served from 1873 to 1875 and afterward resumed his agricultural pursuits. Bowen died at his estate called "Maiden Spring" in Tazewell County, Virginia, on August 29, 1879, and was interred in the family cemetery on the estate.

Bowen was among the over 1,800 members of Congress who enslaved human beings at some point in their lives.

U.S. House of Representatives
Preceded by John T. Harris^{(1)}	Member of the U.S. House of Representatives from Virginia's 9th congressional district March 4, 1873 – March 3, 1875	Succeeded by William Terry
Notes and references
1. Because of Virginia's secession, the House seat was vacant for twelve years before Bowen succeeded Harris.
