= Abram Fulkerson =

Virginia lawyer and politician (1834–1902)

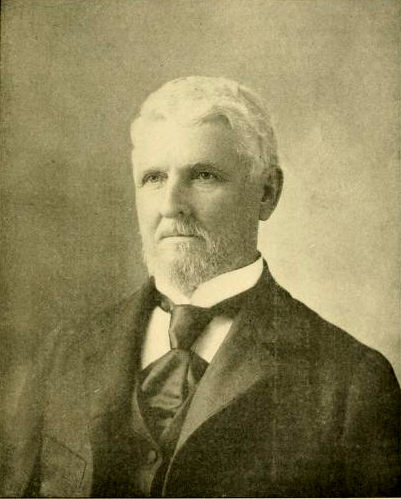

Member of the U.S. House of Representatives from Virginia's 9th district
- In office March 4, 1881 – March 3, 1883
- Preceded by: James Buchanan Richmond
- Succeeded by: Henry Bowen

Member of the Virginia House of Delegates from the Washington County district
- In office December 6, 1871 – November 30, 1875 Serving with A. C. Cummings, Seldon Longley
- Preceded by: George Graham
- Succeeded by: Isaac C. Fowler

Member of the Virginia Senate from the Washington County district
- In office December 5, 1877 – December 7, 1881
- Preceded by: James S. Greever
- Succeeded by: David F. Bailey

Member of the Virginia House of Delegates from the Washington County district
- In office December 2, 1885 – December 7, 1887 Serving with John A. Buchanan
- Preceded by: Daniel Trigg
- Succeeded by: S. P. Edmonson

Personal details
- Born: May 13, 1834 Washington County, Virginia, U.S.
- Died: December 17, 1902 (aged 68) Bristol, Virginia, U.S.
- Party: Democratic
- Spouse: Selina Johnson
- Profession: Politician, lawyer

Military service
- Allegiance: Confederate States of America
- Branch/service: Tennessee Militia; Confederate States Army
- Rank: Colonel (CSA)
- Unit: 19th Tennessee Infantry; 63rd Tennessee Infantry
- Commands: 63rd Tennessee Infantry
- Battles/wars: Battle of Shiloh, Battle of Chickamauga, Battle of Petersburg II, Immortal 600

Abram Fulkerson (May 13, 1834 – December 17, 1902) was a Confederate officer during the American Civil War, and a Virginia lawyer and politician who helped form the short-lived Virginia Readjuster Party. He served in both houses of the Virginia General Assembly, as well as the U.S. House of Representatives, after which he published accounts of his wartime exploits and captivity.

== Family and early life ==
Fulkerson was born on May 13, 1834, in Washington County, Virginia, the youngest son of Abram Fulkerson Sr. (1789–1859) of Lee County, Virginia, and his wife Margaret Laughlin Vance (1796–1864). His family took pride in their military heritage. His grandfather, James Fulkerson, had also served as a Captain, in the Virginia Militia during the American Revolution, joining with the Overmountain Men and fighting the British at the Battle of Kings Mountain. His father, Abram Fulkerson Sr., had served during the War of 1812 as a captain of a Virginia Militia company in Colonel David Sanders' Regiment, 4th Brigade, Norfolk Division under Gen. Peter B. Porter, but by 1850 had moved to Grainger County, Tennessee, where his eldest son James L. Fulkerson died, although Abram Fulkerson Sr. moved back to Washington County, Virginia, before his death in 1859. The family included at least four more sons who survived to adulthood: James Lyon Fulkerson (1816–1849), Samuel Vance Fulkerson (1822–1862), Francis Marion Fulkerson (1825–1894) and Isaac Fulkerson (1831–1889). They also had daughters Mary Vance Fulkerson Davis (1820–1892), Harriet Jane Fulkerson Armstrong (1827–1911) and Katherine Elizabeth Fulkerson (1832–1903).

Abram Jr. graduated from the Virginia Military Institute at Lexington in 1857, where he was a student of Prof. Thomas Jonathan Stonewall Jackson, as had been his elder brother Samuel Vance Fulkerson (1822–1862), who had served in the Mexican–American War and as a delegate to the Virginia Constitutional Convention of 1850. According to VMI records, Isaac Fulkerson had a reputation for being a prankster and wore an "outlandish collar" on his cadet uniform: the collar being the only part of the uniform not covered under regulations. After graduation, he taught school in Palmyra, Virginia, then in 1860 in Rogersville, Hawkins County, Tennessee.

== Confederate officer ==
Fulkerson entered Confederate military service in June 1861 as a Captain, having organized a company of men from Hawkins County, Tennessee, that was mustered into the 19th Tennessee Infantry Regiment as Company K (The Hawkins Boys) at Knoxville, Tennessee. His was the first company of volunteers organized in East Tennessee, and Abram Fulkerson received a commission as the regiment's Major. He was wounded in the thigh and his horse shot from under him at the Battle of Shiloh. After recovery and the unit's reorganization, he was reassigned to the 63rd Tennessee Infantry. Commissioned as Lieutenant Colonel of the 63rd, and President Jefferson Davis on February 12, 1864, commissioned him as a full colonel.

In January 1862, Abram Fulkerson received a furlough and went to Clarksville, Tennessee, and married his fiancé, Selina Johnson (1832–1918) on January 28. They were barely married in time to escape the Union Army's advance on Clarksville. In June, 1862 his brother Col. Samuel Vance Fulkerson was killed in action leading the 37th Virginia Infantry at the Battle of Gaines Mill, the first major victory of General Robert E. Lee. Another brother, Isaac Fulkerson (c. 1829 – July 20, 1889), was a captain in the 8th Texas Cavalry (Terry's Texas Rangers).

Abram Fulkerson twice helped garrison the Cumberland Gap: first with the 19th Tennessee then with the 63rd Tennessee. On May 18, 1863, while at Cumberland Gap, he penned a letter to his wife in which he noted that he was visited there by President Jefferson Davis:

One of our pickets came in the other day and reported that a Mr. Davis was at the lines and desired to enter. This report took me very much by surprise, for although you had mentioned the probability of his coming yet I did not look for him. He only stayed a few hours. After dinner (a very poor one without apology to him) I went [around] to show him some of the curiosities of Cumberland Gap, which he seemed to think would compensate any one for making the visit. He went back up the valley and expected to get home by Wednesday next.

In the same letter, he addressed the news of General Stonewall Jackson's death:

The intelligence of the death of Gen. Jackson came upon us like a shock. We feel that his death is a national calamity. The poorest soldiers among us appreciated his worth - loved the man, and mourn his loss. I knew him well.1 He was my preceptor for more than four years and whilst during that time I did not appreciate the man, as school [schoolboys?]are not like to do, yet I always had great reverence for the man on account of his piety & uprightness of character. Among the many heroes of this revolution, none have lived so much adored, none have died so much deplored, and none have left a character as spotless as that of Stonewall Jackson. Could his life have been spared till the close of this cruel war, the unanimous voice of a grateful people would have proclaimed him chief ruler of the nation. But God has seen proper to take him from us, and what He does is right and for the best. It is [illegible] therefore that we make the sacrifice cheerfully, th'o we cannot see why our country should be deprived of his services at his her hour of greatest need.

== Prisoner of war ==
While in the 63rd, Fulkerson was wounded twice more: in the left arm at the Battle of Chickamauga and again at the Second Battle of Petersburg, Virginia (Battle of Petersburg II), the regiment having been reassigned from the Army of Tennessee to the Army of Northern Virginia. He was taken prisoner on June 17, 1864, and sent to the POW camp at Fort Delaware.

On April 18, 1892, Fulkerson wrote an account of his capture and experiences as a prisoner. He related the events of his capture:

About daylight, on the morning of the 17th, the troops in our front, having been largely reinforced during the night, made charge in three lines on our position, overlapping us on the right, and carrying our works by storm. A large portion of Johnson's Brigade was captured, including myself and about half of my regiment.

The prisoners, in charge of an officer and detail of men, were quickly marched through the Federal lines to General Burnside's headquarters, located in a field about half a mile to the rear. The General had dismounted, and was seated on a camp-stool, and was surrounded by a line of negro guards.

The prisoners were halted at the line of guards, and the officer in charge announced to the General that they had captured the colonel of a regiment, many officers and men, three flags, and several pieces of artillery. Rising from his seat, General Burnside approached us, and, addressing me, enquired what regiment I commanded, and being informed that it was a Tennessee regiment, he asked from what part of the State.

From East Tennessee, I replied. With an expression of astonishment, General Burnside said:

"It is very strange that you should be fighting us when three-fourths of the people of East Tennessee are on our side." Feeling the rebuke unjust and unbecoming an officer of his rank and position, I replied, with as much spirit as I dared manifest, "Well, General, we have the satisfaction of knowing that if three-fourths of our people are on your side, that the respectable people are on our side." At this the General flew into a rage of passion, and railed at me,

"You are a liar, you are a liar, sir, and you know it." I replied, "General, I am a prisoner, and you have the power to abuse me as you please, but as to respectability that is a matter of opinion. We regard no man respectable who deserts his country and takes up arms against his own people." To this General Burnside replied, "I have been in East Tennessee, I was at Knoxville, I know these people, and when you say that such men as Andrew Johnson, Brownlow, Baxter, Temple, Netherland, and others, are not respectable, you lie, sir, and you will have to answer for it." At this point I expected he would order me shot by his negro guards, but he continued, "not to any human power, but to a higher power." With a feeling of relief I answered, "O, General, I am ready to take that responsibility."

"Take him on, take him on," the General shouted to our guards, and thence we were marched some two or three miles towards City Point, to the headquarters of General Patrick, the Provost-Marshall General of Grant's army, where we were guarded during the day in a field, without shelter, and under a burning sun. In other respects we were treated with the consideration due prisoners of war by General Patrick, whom we found to be a gentleman.

While a POW, Fulkerson became part of the Immortal Six Hundred, 600 captured Confederate officers who were taken to Morris Island at Charleston, South Carolina and used as human shields by the Union Army for six weeks in an attempt to silence the Confederate gunners at Fort Sumter, in response to Union officer prisoners being placed among civilians to stop Union gunners from firing into downtown Charleston. Though none of the Immortal Six Hundred were killed by the continuing Confederate artillery fire from Fort Sumter, 14 died of dysentery.

Of his time on Morris Island he wrote in the same 1892 account:

After marching into the pen and being assigned to our tents, we were called out and formed into line, and the rules prescribed for the government of the prisoners were read to us by Colonel Molyneaux, the officer in command. One rule provided that any prisoner who sentinels on the platform above. On account of this rule the prisoners rarely approached nearer than five or six feet of the "Dead Line," and this space between the line and the stockade materially diminished the small area available for our use. Another rule provided that if more than ten prisoners assembled together, the sentinel should order them to disperse, and if the order was not instantly obeyed, he should fire into the crowd. In our crowded condition it was almost impossible to comply with this rule, and we were kept in constant fear of being shot by the negro sentinels, and the command, "'sparse dat crowd," became quite common. On one occasion, I remember, a sentinel bellowed out "'sparse dat crowd damn you, the bullet in de bottom of my gun is just meltin' to get into you now." Another rule was that if a light was struck in any tent after taps, the sentinel was to fire into the tent without notice. The blankets furnished the prisoners at Fort Delaware were taken away from them before they left the Crescent, and returned to the quartermaster at the fort, the officer stating to us that other blankets would be furnished us on the island.

This promise was not complied with. The prisoners who had private blankets were permitted to keep them, and these were hardly sufficient to cover the sand in the tents, for which purpose it was necessary to use them, and on these we slept without covering. There was however, no suffering on this account, as the weather was warm. The rations issued us on the island were insufficient in quantity, but in quality fairly good, consisting generally of hard-tack and salt beef or pork, with coffee once a day, soup occasionally, but no vegetables.

The first effort of the Federals to draw the fire of the Confederate guns upon us was made about sunrise on the morning after our arrival. To that end every battery on the island and the guns on the monitors were, at a given signal, opened upon the Confederate forts, to which the Confederate batteries promptly replied, and a regular artillery duel ensued, lasting for an hour or more. Forts Johnson, Beauregard, Moultrie, and a battery on james Island participated. Shells from the Confederate batteries were thrown with great precision into Fort Wagner, passing immediately over our pen, and others exploded to our left and front so uncomfortably close to the pen that we, at first, thought our friends were not upon the island. This storm of shot and shell created some consternation upon the prisoners, and at first caused something like a panic, but we soon became satisfied that the Confederates knew what they were doing, and that there was no real danger. The negro sentinels on top of the stockades were greatly frightened as the Confederate shells thrown into Fort Wagner, and shells from the guns in that fort passed immediately over them. The Confederates seemed to have the exact range of every point on the island within the reach of their guns.

We were kept on the island about six weeks, and these artillery duels occurred frequently during our stay, but the Confederates fired with such precision that not a single shot or shell fell within our stockade, and but one shell exploded immediately over us, and whilst several pieces fell in the pen, no one was injured. If the purpose of the Federal authorities in placing these prisoners on the island was to have them shot by their own people, six weeks must have convinced them that the experiment was a failure. However this may be, at the end of that time we were is situated on an island in the mouth of the Savannah river. This fort was of brick and built upon piles. We were confined in a portion of the casemates of the fort; the other casemates were used as quarters for the garrison.

After Morris Island, Fulkerson was taken to Fort Pulaski and placed on starvation rations for 42 days in retaliation for Confederate prisoner abuses at Andersonville. Crowded into the fort's cold, damp casements, the Confederates' "retaliation ration" consisted of 10 ounces of moldy cornmeal and a half pint of soured onion pickles. The starving men supplemented their rations with the occasional rat or stray cat. Thirteen men died there of preventable diseases such as dysentery and scurvy.

At Fort Pulaski, the prisoners organized "The Relief Association of Fort Pulaski for Aid and Relief of the Sick and Less Fortunate Prisoners" on December 13, 1864, and Fulkerson was elected president. Out of their sparse funds, the prisoners collected and spent eleven dollars, according to a report filed by Fulkerson on December 28, 1864.

In March 1865 Fulkerson was returned to Fort Delaware, where he was discharged and paroled on July 25, 1865, months after General Robert E. Lee's surrender at Appomattox.

While at Fort Delaware, prisoners were taken out to the badly polluted river every day and allowed to bathe and swim. Fulkerson, a very thin man with auburn hair, could float "like a cork" and would lie on his back and float out with the current for ten or fifteen minutes until the nervous guards, fearing that an escape attempt, ordered him to return to the shore.

After Fulkerson returned home, his horse that he rode during his military service, whose official name was "Zollicoffer" (after former Congressman and early Confederate casualty Felix Zollicoffer), was returned to him. Fulkerson kept the horse for the rest of its life, but called him "Old Bob." When the horse died, former Confederates from the Bristol area assembled and conducted a military funeral for it. In 1885, Stonewall Jackson's horse, "Little Sorrel," was brought to Bristol on a tour and Fulkerson rode it as a number of former veterans assembled to pay their respects.

== Legal and political career ==
As the war ended, Fulkerson studied law, was admitted to the bar and began his legal practice in Goodson, later known as Bristol, Virginia, in 1866 with the firm of York & Fulkerson. As a lawyer, he was regarded as a legal giant in Bristol and it is said that he was such a gifted orator that many of the local citizens would go to court and sit in on trials just to hear him speak.

Fulkerson was elected and re-elected to the Virginia House of Delegates as one of two delegates representing Washington County, Virginia (part-time). He served from 1871 to 1875, until voters replaced both delegates. Next he served in the State senate of Virginia 1877–1881.

Voters from Virginia's 9th congressional district elected Fulkerson as a Readjuster Democrat from to the Forty-seventh Congress (March 4, 1881 – March 3, 1883). He defeating incumbent James Buchanan Richmond, a lawyer and banker (and former subordinate officer to his brother Samuel in the 37th Virginia), in the Democratic primary. Fulkerson helped organize the Readjuster Party, after which he returned to the Democratic Party.

Fulkerson resumed his legal practice after deciding against seeking re-election to Congress. Fellow Readjuster Henry Bowen succeeded him. Voters again elected Fulkerson to the State House of Delegates in 1888, alongside John A. Buchanan who together replaced Daniel Trigg and Jonas S. Kelly and were in turn replaced in 1887 by John Roberts and S. P. Edmonson.

After retiring from politics, Fulkerson wrote a memoir of his captivity and published it in 1894. Fulkerson was a delegate to the Democratic National (Gold) Convention in 1896.

== Death and legacy ==
Fulkerson died in Bristol, Virginia, on December 17, 1902, at the age of 68, of complications after suffering a stroke. Henry Clinton Wood who served as the Major of the 37th Virginia Infantry (CS) under Fulkerson's brother Samuel Vance, and for whom the town of Clintwood, Virginia, was named, served as an honorary pallbearer in the funeral. His widow would survive for a decade, and his son Samuel Vance Fulkerson (1863–1926), although he married in Grayson, Texas, would become a Virginia lawyer and die aged 64 in Virginia Beach on July 2, 1926, and be buried in the same cemetery, East Hill Cemetery.

VMI maintains the Fulkerson family papers in its library's archives. The Sons of Confederate Veterans Abram Fulkerson Camp 2104 in Greeley, Colorado, bears his name.

His descendant third cousin, Joe Adkins, portrays Fulkerson at Civil War reenactments. A member of the Sons of Confederate Veterans, Adkins commands the Gen. Alfred E. Jackson Camp 2159 in Jonesborough, Tennessee.

U.S. House of Representatives
Preceded by James Richmond	Member of the U.S. House of Representatives from Virginia's 9th congressional district 1881–1883	Succeeded by Henry Bowen
