= Belleville, Virginia =

Unincorporated community in Virginia, United States

Belleville is an unincorporated community in the independent city of Suffolk, Virginia, United States. It is located at the junction of Interstate 664, U.S. Route 17, and State Route 164.

== Demographics ==
Belleville, Virginia encompasses a total of 1,256 residents with a median age of 44.6. Of this, 56.45% are males and 43.55% are females, totaling 457 households with an average of 3 members per home. The average household income estimates $77,777, a -1.5% decrease from prior years. Of this, $66,326 represents the median household income, a -20.0% decrease from prior years. Within Belleville, an estimated 108 individuals live below the poverty level whereas 1,148 live above the poverty line.

== Education ==
Approximately 41.8% of the population in Belleville holds a high school degree (418 residents), while 14.4% have attained a college certificate (382 residents) and 11.8% have a bachelor's degree (118 residents).

== Founding ==
In 1903, 40 acres of the land where Belleville now sits was purchased by William Henry Plummer, on behalf of the church to which he belonged, the Church of God and Saints of Christ. The church had a vision of founding a town on the land for his church members. However, due to financial hardship, Plummer lost the land in 1909. It was then purchased by John Eberwine in 1917 during an auction. Learning of the church's vision, Eberwine decided to continue the project.
