= African Americans in Israel =

African americans making aliyah to Israel

Total population
- 25,000

Regions with significant populations
- Tel Aviv, Dimona, Jerusalem, Ein Shemer, Haifa, Ariel, Eilat, Ashkelon

Languages
- English, Hebrew

Religion
- Judaism, Black Israelism, Christianity.

Related ethnic groups
- African Americans

African Americans in Israel number at least 25,000, comprise several separate groups, including the groups of African American Jews who have emigrated from the United States to Israel making aliyah, non-Jewish African Americans who have immigrated to Israel for personal or business reasons, pro-athletes who formerly played in the major leagues in the United States before playing in Israel on local basketball and other sports teams, as well as foreign students studying in Israeli universities, businessmen, merchants, and guest workers, along with Israeli citizens of African American ancestry. African Americans have served in the Israel Defence Forces, and have largely been accepted into Israeli society, and have represented Israel in numerous international forums such as the Olympic Games, and the Eurovision Song Contest. African American-Israelis have had a major cultural impact in Israel, particular in the arts and culture, music and sports. In addition, there as a large community of Black Hebrew Israelites numbering at least 5,000 people, who originally immigrated to Israel from Chicago in the 1960s, and live mostly in the southern Israeli town of Dimona.

== African American Israelis ==
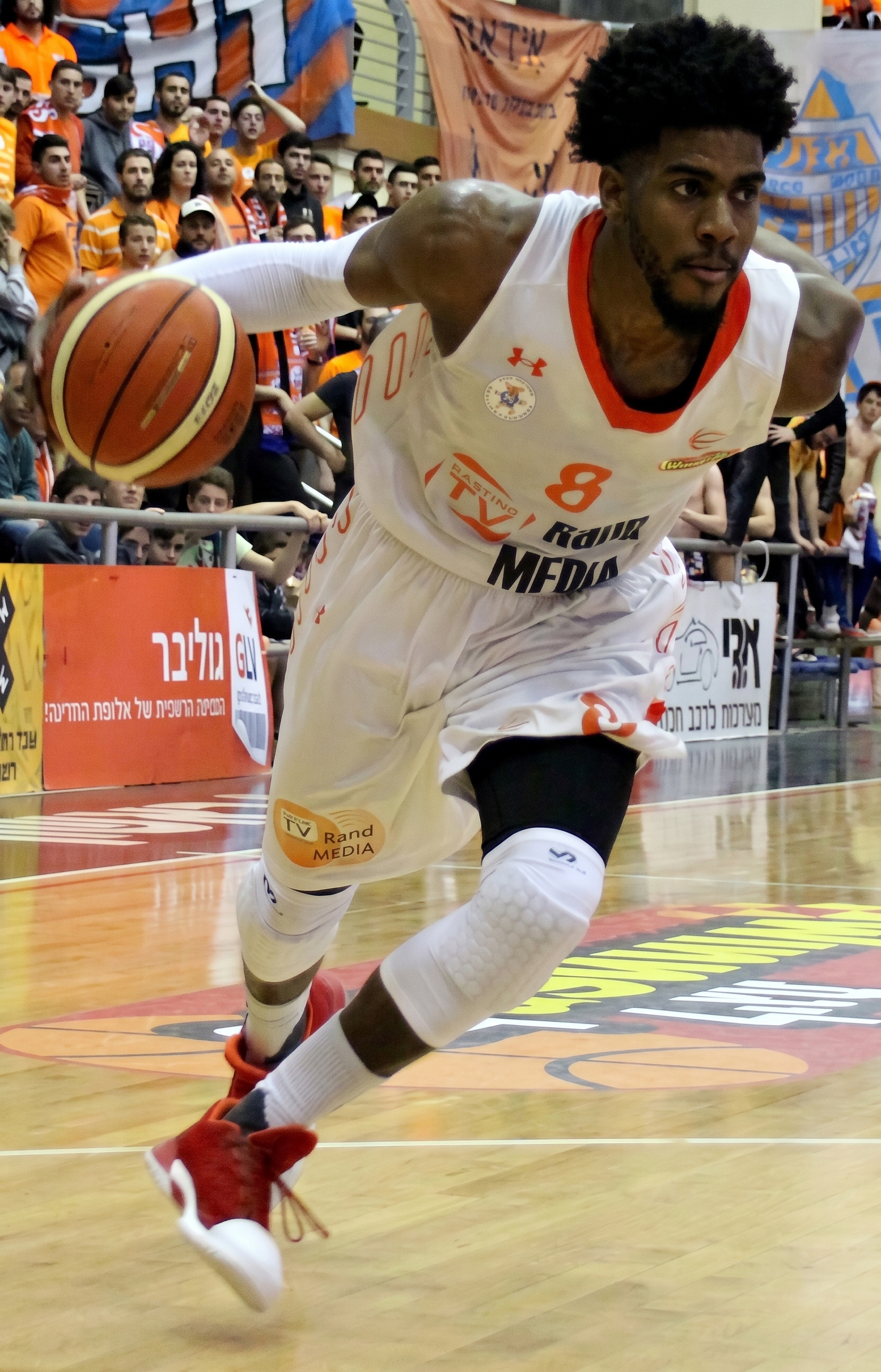
African American-Israeli basketball player Shawn Dawson, son of American-born Israeli Joe Dawson and his Yemenite Jewish wife

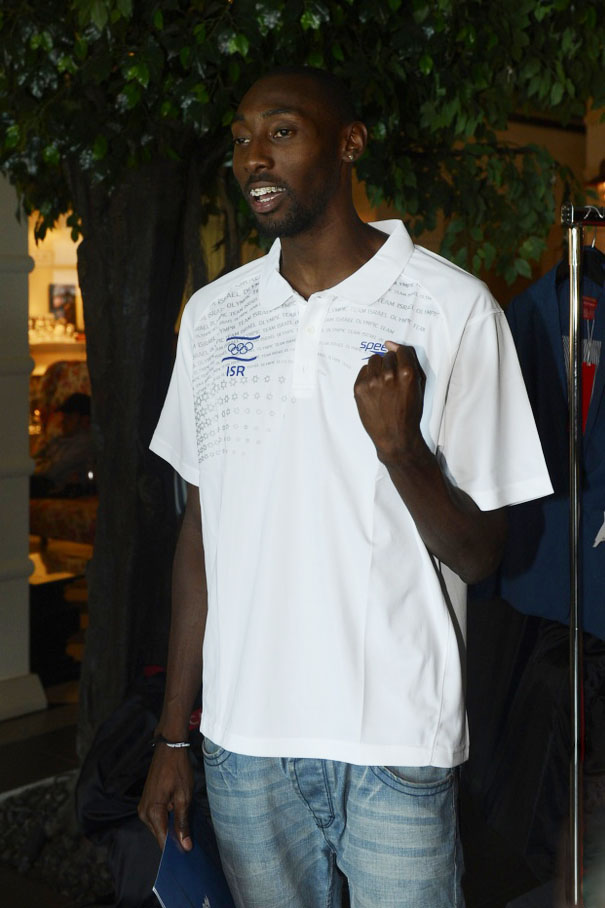
African American-Israeli sprinter Donald Sanford represented Israel at the 2016 Olympics.

There are a large number of African American Israelis including the American-born Israeli basketball player Joe Dawson and his Israeli-born son Shawn Dawson who live in Eilat, and American-born Israeli Olympic athlete Donald Sanford who lives in Ein Shemer with his Ashkenazi-Israeli wife.

== African American Jews ==
There are a number of African American Jews who have made aliyah to Israel. All African American Jews are eligible for Israeli citizenship, like all other Jews, according to the Israeli law of return. They span the full range of denominations of Judaism including Reform, Conservative, Orthodox and various streams of Haredi Judaism. Notable African American Jews who moved to Israel include Nissim Black, Amar'e Stoudmire, Nikia Browne, From Kohav Nolad season 8 and others.

== African American athletes in Israel ==
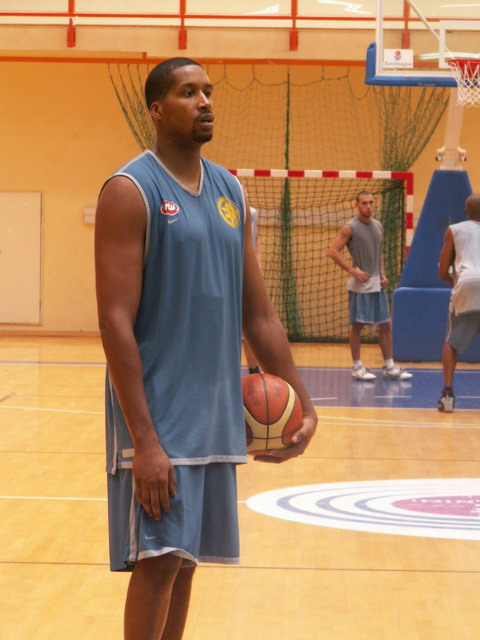
Jamie Arnold, a retired African American-Israeli basketball player with dual citizenship who played for the Israeli national basketball team

A number of African American pro athletes have moved to Israel to play for local Israeli sports teams. The majority of these athletes are basketball players, and some have decided to stay in Israel permanently following their time in the Israeli national basketball league.

== Black Hebrew Israelite community in Israel ==
The African Hebrew Israelite Nation of Jerusalem (also known as the Black Hebrew Israelites of Jerusalem, the Black Hebrew Israelites, or simply the Black Hebrews or Black Israelites) is a spiritual group of African Americans in Israel, now mainly based in Dimona, Israel, whose members believe they are descended from the Twelve Tribes of Israel. The community now numbers around 5,000. They came from a group of African Americans, many from Chicago, Illinois, who migrated to Israel in the late 1960s.

The group was founded in Chicago by a former steel worker named Ben Carter (1939–2014, also known as Ben Ammi Ben-Israel). In his early twenties Carter was given the name Ben Ammi by Rabbi Reuben of the Chicago Congregation of Ethiopian Hebrews. Ben Ammi was working in an airline factory when he first discovered the Black Hebrew movement and its philosophy. According to Ben Ammi, in 1966, at the age of 27, he had a vision in which the Archangel Gabriel called him to take his people, African Americans, back to the Holy Land of Israel.

Initially, the African Hebrew Israelites asserted that they were the only rightful inheritors of the land of Israel. They refused to convert to Judaism and asserted that most Israeli Jews were not descendants of the ancient Israelites. By the late 1980s, the group tempered their beliefs. They came to see Israel as a nation of many cultures, races, and religions.

== Notable African-American Israelis ==
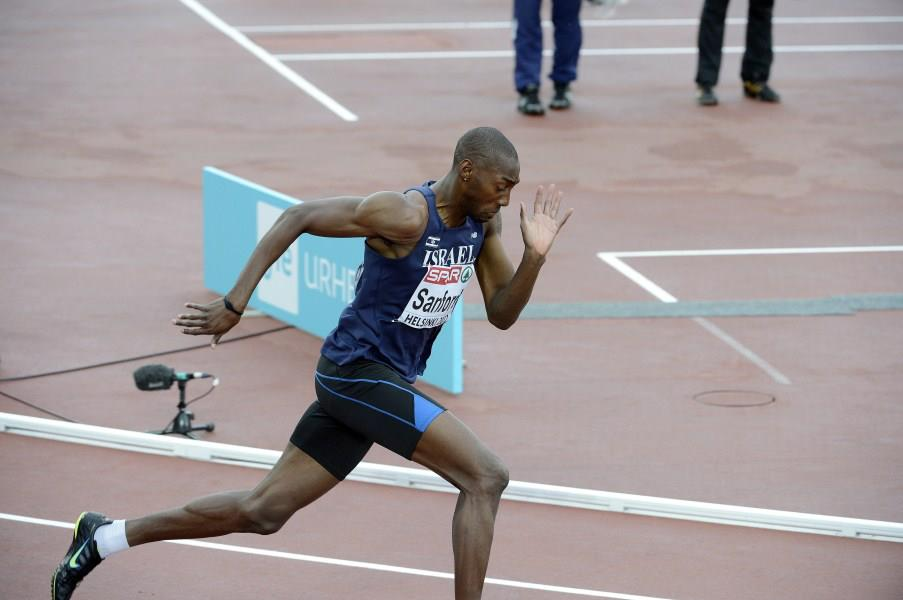
African American-Israeli sprinter Donald Sanford representing Israel

- Jamie Arnold- African American-Israeli basketball player who played for the member of the Israel men's national basketball team.
- Eddie Butler- Israeli singer of African Hebrew Israelite origin, who later converted to Orthodox Judaism and was a member of the band Eden. Butler was the first person of African American descent to participate in the Eurovision Song Contest when he represented Israel twice at the 2000 and 2006 editions of the event.
- Joe Dawson- African American -Israeli professional basketball player

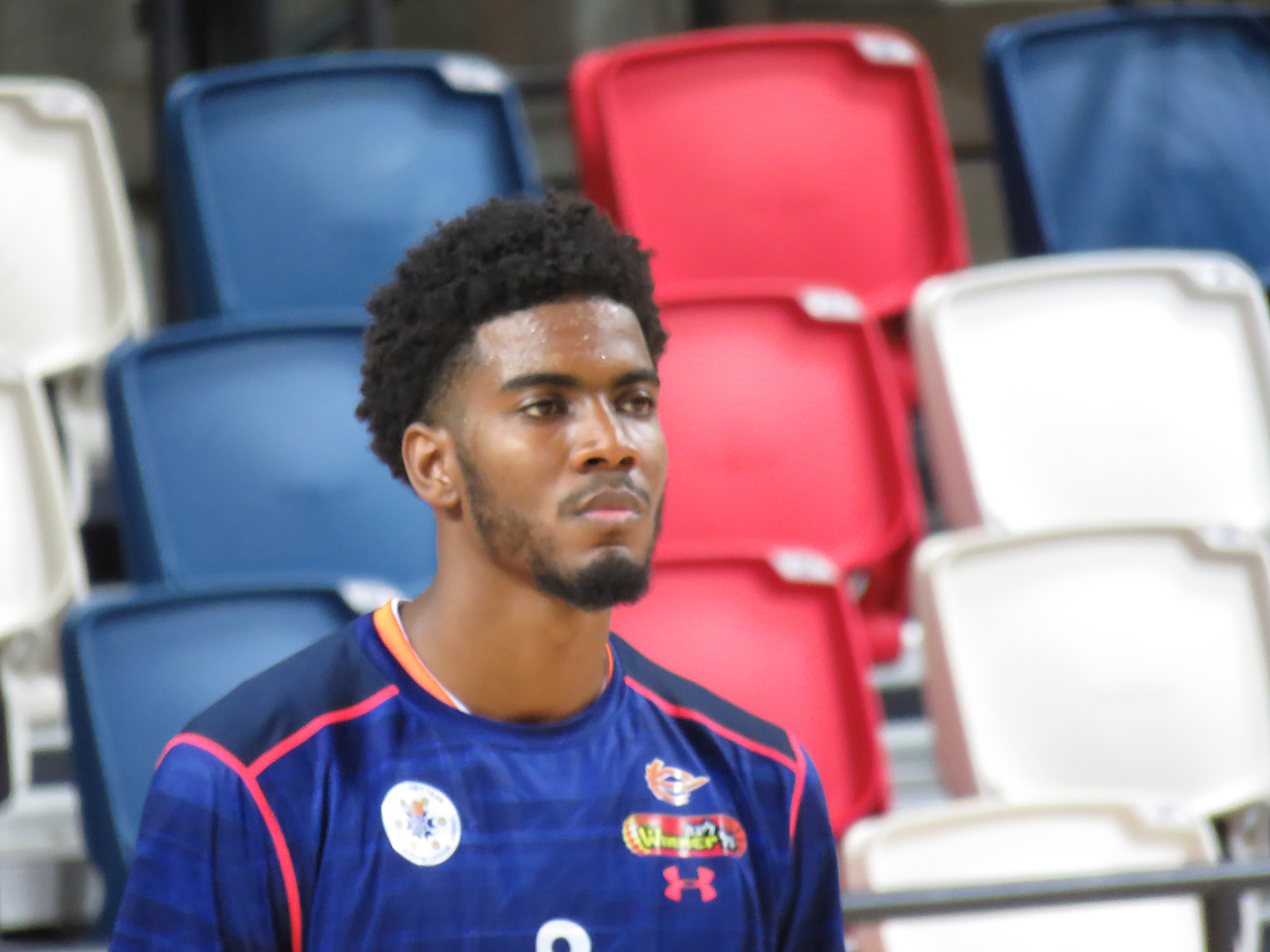
Israeli basketball player Shawn Dawson

- Shawn Dawson- Israeli basketball player of African American and Yemenite Jewish descent, son of Joe Dawson, and member of the Israel men's national basketball team.

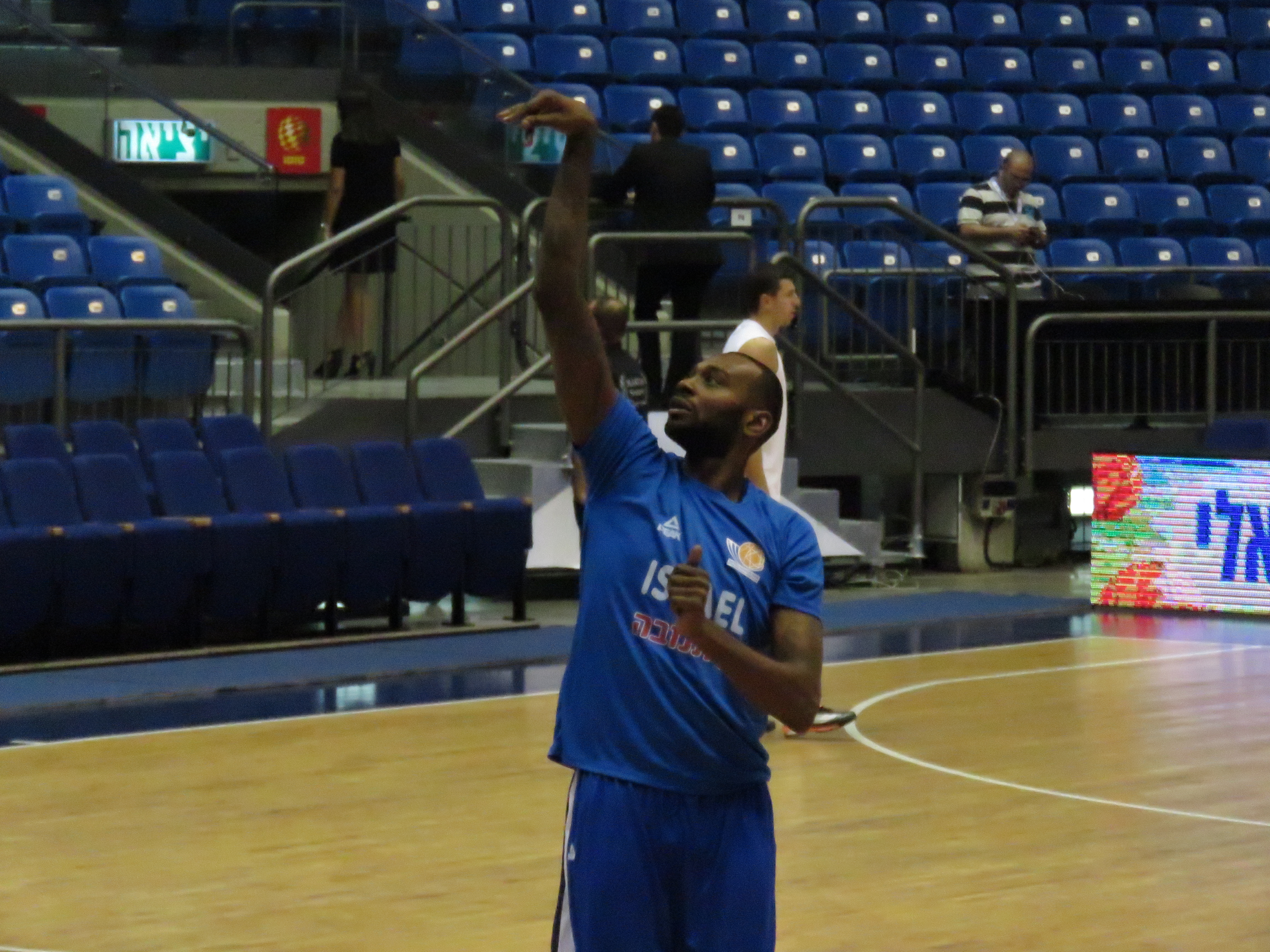
D'or Fischer, an African American-Israeli professional basketball player with dual citizenship who has represented Israel on their national team

- D'or Fischer (born October 12, 1981) is an American–Israeli professional basketball player for Elitzur Eito Ashkelon of the Israeli National League. He is originally from Philadelphia, Pennsylvania but has lived in Israel since the early 2000s and has been married to an Israeli woman since 2008. Fischer has also represented the senior Israeli national team. Standing at 2.11 m (6 ft 11 in), he plays at the power forward and center positions.
- Ahuva Gray- African American-Israeli religious author and memoirist. She is a former Baptist minister from Chicago who converted to Orthodox Judaism and chronicled her changing beliefs in the book My Sister, the Jew, and has lived in Bayit VeGan, Jerusalem, Israel since the late 20th century.
- Ambassador S. Fitzgerald Haney currently leads American Friends of Isaac Accords. The organization aims to promote cooperation between Israel and countries in Latin America and the Caribbean, serving as the philanthropic and operational vehicle for the Isaac Accords. Haney is an American diplomat and businessman who served as the U.S. ambassador to the Republic of Costa Rica from 2015 to 2017.
- Aulcie Perry- African American-Israeli professional basketball player who played for Maccabi Tel Aviv between 1976 and 1985, who converted to Judaism and became an Israeli citizen in 1978.
- Donald Sanford- African American-Israeli Olympic sprinter originally from Inglewood, California, who represented Israel at the 2012 and 2016 Olympics and is married to Israeli basketball player Danielle Dekel-Sanford since 2008, and resides in Kibbutz Ein Shemer. Sanford won a gold medal in the Men's 400m at the 2013 Maccabiah Games, and was named the 2014 Israeli Sportsman on The Year after he became only the second-Israeli to win the bronze medal in the 400 metres sprint at the European Athletic Championships held in Zurich on August 15, 2014, with a new Israeli record of 45.27 seconds. He dedicated his medal to the Israel Defense Forces. He also represented Israel at the 2012 and 2016 Summer Olympic Games.

== See also ==
- Americans in Israel
- Doms in Israel
- Ethiopian Jews in Israel
- Beta Israel
- African American Jews
- African American diaspora
- African American–Jewish relations
