= Ben Ammi =

Ben Ammi may refer to:

- Ben Ami, a moshav in northern Israel
- Ben Ammi Ben-Israel, founder and spiritual leader of the African Hebrew Israelites of Jerusalem

== See also ==
- Ben-Ami
