= Sister Wife =

- Directed by: Hadar Kleinman Zadok; Timna Goldstein
- Produced by: Hadar Kleinman
- Release date: 2000
- Running time: 60 min.
- Country: Israel
- Language: English

Sister Wife is a 2000 documentary that follows an African Hebrew Israelite family in Dimona, as they take on an additional wife. It was directed by Timna Goldstein and Hadar Kleinman. It was broadcast on Channel 2 in Israel on 11 October 2000.

== Overview ==
Zipporah and Hazriel are a married couple in the Black Hebrew community which settled in Israel and practices polygyny; in some cases, men are allowed to have up to seven wives.

After 21 years of marriage, Hazriel decides to take on a second wife, a woman named Areala who is 14 years younger than Zipporah. Despite a seemingly harmonious start to the arrangement, over the course of the year, the two wives start to fall out and the husband is dissatisfied, leading him to consider finding a third wife in the near future.

== Reception ==
A 2000 review in The Jerusalem Post called Sister Wife "a worthwhile documentary".
