= Ben-Ami =

Ben-Ami (Hebrew: בֶּן עַמִּי; means "Son of my People") is a given name and surname. Notable people with the name include:

Given name:

- Ben Ammi Ben-Israel, founder of The African Hebrew Israelites of Jerusalem
- Ben-Ami Kadish (1923–2012), U.S. Army mechanical engineer

Surname:

- Daniel Ben-Ami, British journalist
- Doron Ben-Ami, Israeli archaeologist
- Didi Benami (born 1986), American singer/songwriter
- Jacob Ben-Ami (1890–1977), Russian-born stage actor
- Jeremy Ben-Ami, chairman of U.S. Israel advocacy group J Street
- Joseph Ben-Ami, head of the Canadian Centre for Policy Studies
- Moshe Ben-Ami (1898–1960), an Israeli politician and lawyer
- Naomi Ben-Ami (born 1960), Israeli diplomat and head of Nativ
- Shlomo Ben-Ami (born 1943), Israeli diplomat, politician and historian

== See also ==
- Ammon
