= Ben Ammi Ben-Israel =

Founder of the African Hebrew Israelite Nation of Jerusalem (1939–2014)

- בן עמי בן-ישראל
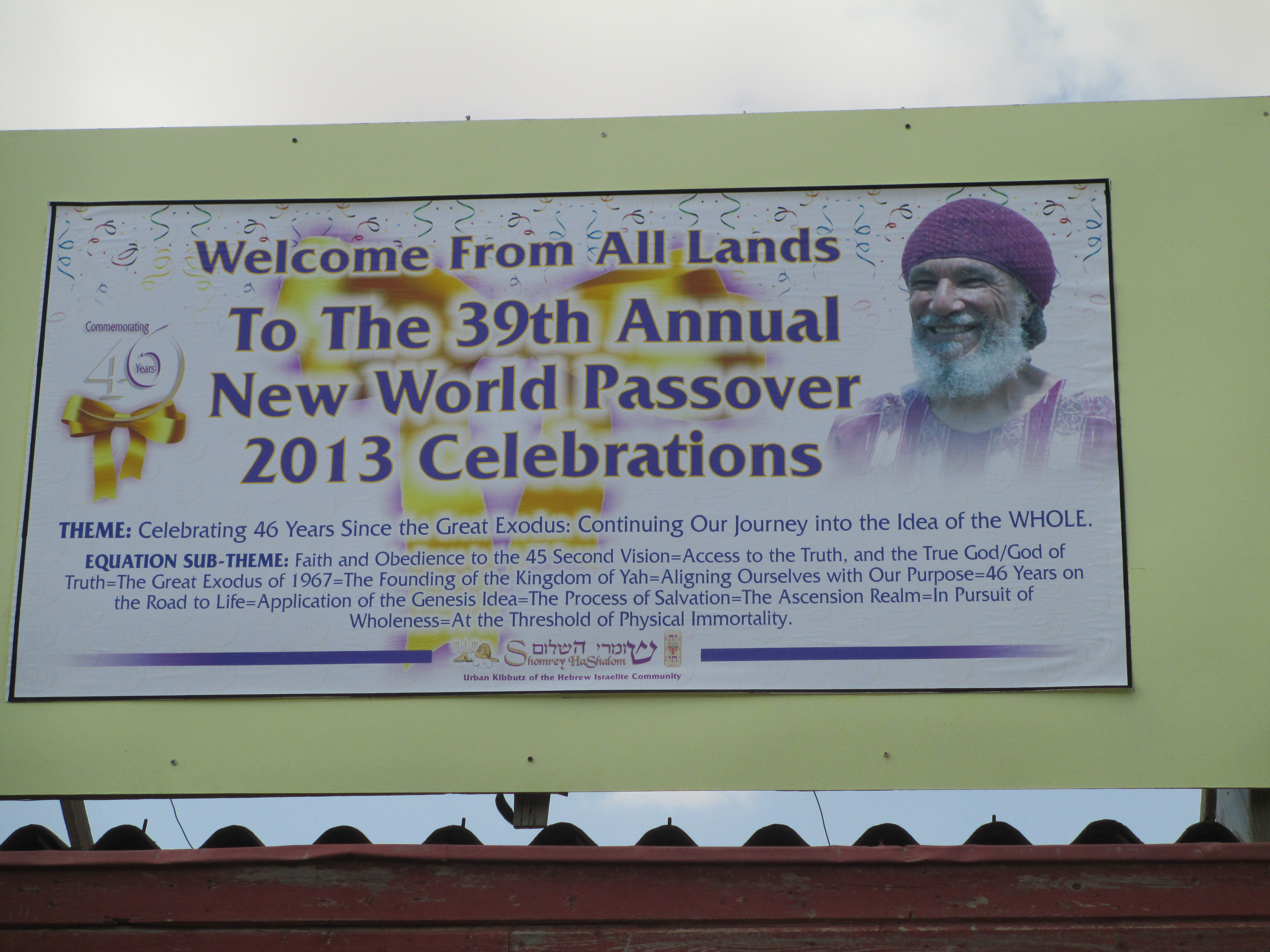
- Born: Ben Carter; October 12, 1939; Chicago, United States
- Died: December 27, 2014 (aged 75); Beersheba, Israel
- Citizenship: American; Israeli (Note: Reportedly granted Israeli citizenship in 2013, but was not recognized as being of Israelite descent and also refused to convert to Judaism. Ben Ammi did not identify as Jewish or Samaritan.)
- Years active: 1966–2014
- Known for: Founding the African Hebrew Israelite Nation of Jerusalem
- Movement: Black Hebrew Israelites
- Children: 25

Ben Ammi Ben-Israel (Hebrew: בן עמי בן-ישראל; October 12, 1939 – December 27, 2014) was an American-born Israeli spiritual leader. Inspired by the Black Hebrew Israelites in the United States, he founded the African Hebrew Israelite Nation of Jerusalem, which claims that African Americans originate from the Land of Israel. The community's initial members claimed Israelite descent and undertook a major initiative to immigrate to the State of Israel during and after the 1960s. Ben Ammi stated that Black people were descended from the Twelve Tribes of Israel and thus were the "true inheritors" of Israel, and created a new religious movement that he claimed was authentically Hebrew or Israelite in theology and practice. Though he was born a Baptist Christian, he denounced Judaism and Christianity as false religions, but maintained that the Jewish Bible was still divine.

According to his community, Ben Ammi witnessed a divine revelation in Chicago in 1966, when the angel Gabriel told him to lead his people to Israel and establish the Kingdom of God there. He rallied other African Americans to his cause, changing his name from Ben Carter to Ben Ammi Ben-Israel, and first settled in Liberia before immigrating to Israel with his followers. The Israeli government and Israeli religious authorities considered them non-Jews and deported many of the community's illegal immigrants. Eventually, some of the community's members were given pathways to permanent residency and Ben Ammi himself became an Israeli citizen in 2013. A number of African Hebrew Israelites, heeding calls from Ben Ammi in the past, have also enlisted in the Israel Defense Forces.

In 2014, Ben Ammi died at a hospital in Beersheba; his African Hebrew Israelite Nation stood at about 5,000 people at this time and was mostly concentrated in Dimona. His views and statements, as well as those of his community's, have stirred controversy and are often charged with antisemitism and Black supremacy. Following Israel's deportation of many African Hebrew Israelite illegal immigrants, Ben Ammi accused the Israeli government of racism and of occupying the Holy Land through an international Jewish conspiracy. He also claimed that Israeli Jews and Palestinian Arabs had an erroneous tradition of descent from Isaac and Ishmael, respectively, and that they were instead descended from European Crusaders. Ben Ammi stated that African Americans had been victims of "Euro-gentile dominion" in the United States, where they were led to believe that Abraham, Moses, and Jesus were not Black people. He and his community have not identified as Jewish.

== Biography ==
Ben Carter (later Ben Ammi Ben-Israel) was born in Chicago, Illinois, to a Baptist family. After dropping out of high school, Carter served three years in the United States Army, where he earned an equivalency degree. He married Patricia Price (later Ahdinah Carter) in 1959.

After Carter was discharged from the Army, he worked as a metallurgist at Chicago's Howard Foundry. In 1961, a co-worker introduced him to the idea that African Americans are descendants of the Biblical Israelites. Carter began to attend meetings of black Israelite groups, and was given a Hebrew name, Ben Ammi Ben-Israel. In 1964 he and several others founded the Abeta Hebrew Israel Culture Center.

According to the Hebrew Israelite community, in 1966, Ben Ammi received a vision from the angel Gabriel, who told him to lead African-Americans to Israel. In the vision, he claimed he was instructed to: "Lead the children of Israel among African Americans to the promised land, and establish the long-awaited Kingdom of God." In any case, Ben Ammi was one of four members of the Abeta Hebrew Israel Cultural Center to be chosen to travel to Liberia to explore the possibility of settlement there.

In July 1967, a number of Abeta families began to arrive in Liberia, settling in spartan conditions on land purchased by an African American citizen of Liberia on behalf of the community. According to one account, Ben Ammi began his rise to leadership within the group around Passover in 1968. In accordance with their belief that they were the descendants of ancient Israelites, community members planned to sacrifice a lamb or kid (baby goat) as part of the observance of the holiday. When the goat acquired for the occasion was found accidentally strangled, and therefore ritually impure to be used as a sacrifice, Ben Ammi made a speech declaring that the faith and observance of the Black Hebrews was the true sacrifice that God desired.

The Abeta settlers were not welcomed by the Liberian government, and suffered from economic and social difficulties. Many died from diseases, and many others returned to the USA. In May 1968, Ben Ammi visited Israel to once again explore the possibility the group's relocation, taking with him Hezekiyah Blackwell. Blackwell remained in Israel, enlisting in a kibbutz in order to become familiar with Israeli culture.

According to Ben Ammi, tickets were purchased for their move to Israel with the proceeds from the sale of two ice cream shops established for the group's benefit in Monrovia, as well as "divine intelligence." In 1970, 48 families became new immigrants under Israel's Law of Return. Ben Ammi and more of his followers arrived in the ensuing months, settling in the Negev city of Dimona. Others settled in Arad and Mitzpe Ramon The community was eventually given permanent residency in 1990, and later were entitled to become Israeli citizens by naturalization, which does not imply any Jewish status. Ben Ammi served as the community's spiritual and political leader during this time, authoring a number of books.

Ben Ammi died in a hospital in Be'er Sheva. At the time of his death, Ben Ammi had four wives—Tikvah, Yoninah, Baht Zion and Baht Ammi, as well as 25 children, 45 grandchildren, and 15 great-grandchildren. He had been granted Israeli citizenship in 2013.

== Teachings ==
Ben Ammi claimed that he and the Black Hebrews from the original Liberian settlement were not Jews but Hebrews, the true descendants of the ancient Israelites. Ben Ammi originally believed that Moses and Abraham were black, and that the Black Hebrews were the only "true" inheritors of Israel.

While rejecting the modern religious forms of both Judaism and Christianity, he maintained the divine inspiration of the Tanakh, and perceived Yeshua as one of an ongoing line of 'messiahs' sent by God to keep the people of Israel in the ways of righteousness. The core of the group's lifestyle is the Tanakh, Ben Ammi claimed that "the Law and the Prophets...are the light; they are the essence of what is required to set man on the path and show him the way back to his Maker." However the group reject the traditions of Rabbinic Judaism including the Talmud as inauthentic to Hebrew religion.

Ben Ammi claimed that Africans are the victims of "a cruel plot to control us, an international religious plot that came about as a result of Blacks disobeying the law and commandments of God." In the attempt to overcome the history of slavery and the bondage in America, Ammi argues that it is essential to "reexamine and redefine all things...we must question every facet of existence under Euro-gentile dominion." The ability to name and classify the word and social concepts Ammi calls "The Power to Define", which in the wrong hands is "one of the greatest weapons that can be used to control men and nations," but is the key to salvation from past oppression.

Ben Ammi translated his perspective of Africa's problems being "spiritual problems" into an expansive set of socio-political, economic, agricultural and health-related positions. He emphasized the need for African Leaders to "learn from their history and the African Cultural Value System", in order to combat the "perception engineering" which is conducted by many Western institutions.

During a 2002 interview with Rob Redding of the Redding News Review, Ben Ammi expressed confidence in his community's ability to persevere even without him. When asked "What are the provisions within the community, to take care of the community, should something happen to you?" he responded "It is the word that I speak, the truth that I speak, that is deeply embedded in their souls...I am flesh, blood, and spirit - but it is the spirit I possess; the spirit the ancient prophets possess, that is of such significance to the redemption of our people." Defining himself as a "representative" of this Holy Spirit, Ben Ammi carefully distinguished the community from a sect or cult that risked social or political disintegration as a result of his absence, citing the long-term implications of Daniel 2:44 for biblical reference

Ben-Israel was revered as a messianic figure in the community, his picture adorning at least one wall in every apartment. In an interview, Ben Ammi described his status as a spiritual leader:

My anointing did not come until after we had arrived in Israel. The Father sent a prophet to anoint me and to let me know the further off or great portion of my mission...At the time he anointed me...I received the name Nasi Hashalom [The Prince of Peace]...Later on this same prophet came again to tell me according to the word of God that at a later date someone would be sent to anoint me to sit on the throne of David in the spirit and to fulfill the prophecies of he that was to sit on the throne of David. The words of a true prophet, they certainly came to pass, and it took place just as he said. Afterwards, from Nasi Hashalom my name was changed to Rabbey and Adoni Rabbey [My Lord and Master].

According to the Hebrew Israelite community, singer and then actress Whitney Houston claimed Ben-Israel as her spiritual father.

Ben Ammi's approach to theology has been characterized as one of "pneumatic immanence", which combines a belief in an indwelling God with the centrality of Life as a manifestation of Divinity. While God was the source of life, growth and vitality, Ammi counterposed this with satan (uncapitalized) which was the power of death, decay and destruction. Ammi taught physical immortality as the intended and eventual state of humanity, but one that could only be realized through righteous living: following the commandments given in the Torah and building a perfect society. This is the channeling of Divine power through humanity - a necessary element given that Ben Ammi's God is non-interventionist, only influencing humans through subtle convincing.

It has been argued that while Ammi's early teachings were apocalyptic and conspiratorial, as well as exclusive in their focus on African Americans, these later matured into a sophisticated universalist theology which drew upon various elements found within American Protestantism; the Black Church; Black Hebrew Israelite tradition; academic Black Theology; Black Power thought; and the teachings of Elijah Muhammad. The changes may have been impacted by the non-occurrence of the predicted apocalypse of September 1977, and the need to forge a non-antagonistic path forward with the State of Israel.

== Awards and recognition ==
In March 2010, Ben Ammi received a Lifetime Achievement Award in Ghana, West Africa. This award is given out by the Ghanaian Country Awards Council. At the ceremony, the Country Director of CACG (Country Awards Council Ghana) stated that Ben Ammi "has helped bridged the gap between spirituality and development like no other leader before in global history, in the process creating new and progressive options for successfully building communities and projects based on enduring righteous, African cultural principles."

BBC's "Focus on Africa" magazine in the year 2000 named him "One of the Most Influential Africans of the Last Millennium".

== See also ==
- Groups claiming affiliation with Israelites
  - Black Hebrew Israelites
  - African Hebrew Israelite Nation of Jerusalem
- African-American–Jewish relations
  - African-American Jews
- History of the Jews in Africa
- Race and appearance of Jesus
