= Rob Redding =

American journalist and commentator

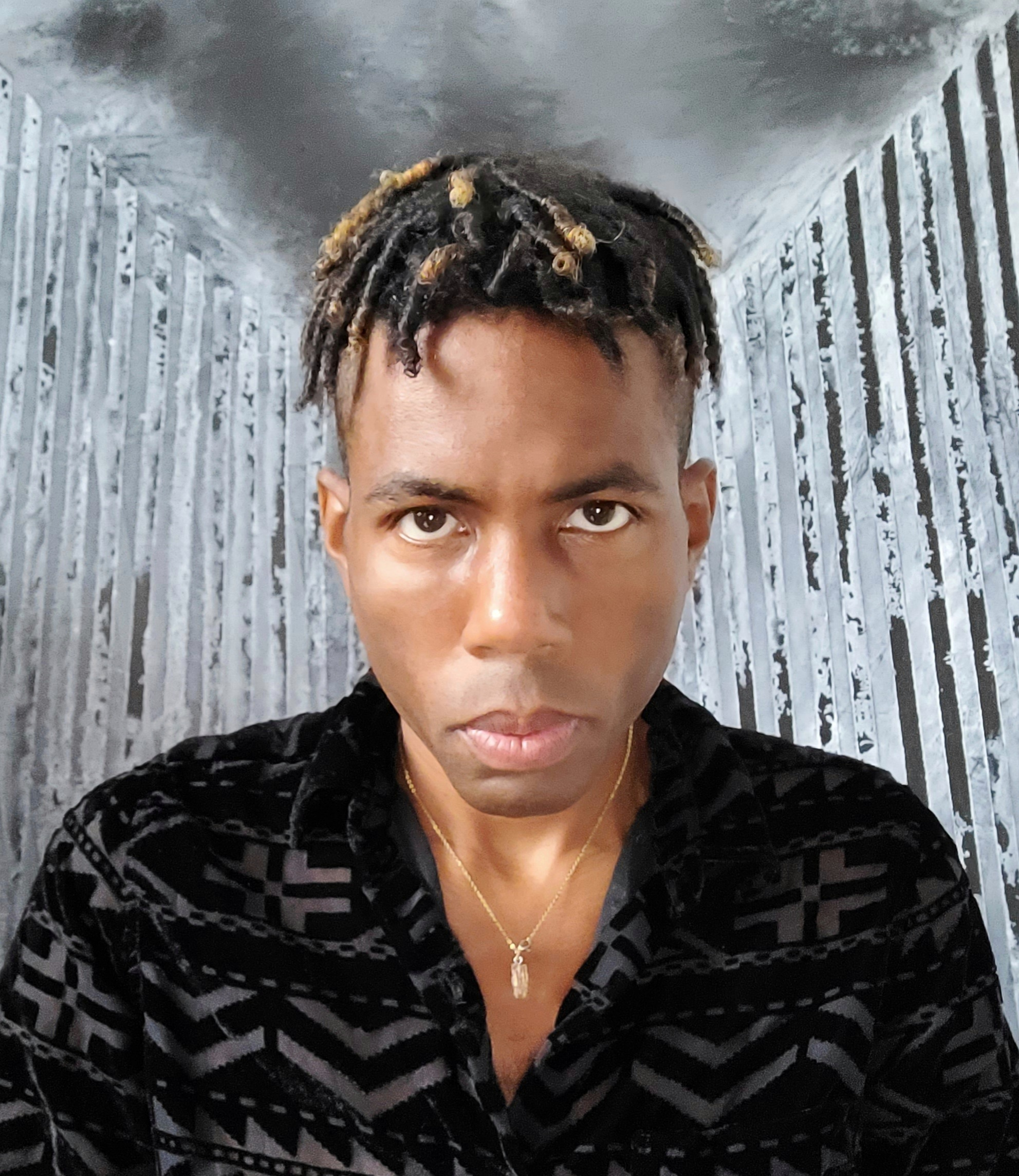
- Redding in 2021
- Born: Robert Redding Jr. Atlanta, Georgia, U.S.
- Education: Pratt Institute, Marshall University and University of Louisiana
- Known for: Producing Redding News Review; Writing The Professor: Witnessing White Power
- Website: www.robredding.com

Robert Redding Jr. is an American podcaster, journalist, educator, author and artist. From 2012 to 2013, he hosted the weekday syndicated Redding News Review on SiriusXM.

== Personal life and education ==
Redding's father was a preacher. His mother was a teacher in the Atlanta Public Schools. He was raised in the Atlanta area and attended the University of Louisiana where he majored in speech communication. He graduated with a master's degree in communication from Marshall University in Huntington, West Virginia. He graduated with Master's in Fine Art in painting and drawing in 2022 from Pratt Institute in Brooklyn.

He is based in New York City and is said to be "the first out bisexual black radio talk show host". He has a daughter Rachel Redding.

== Journalism and teaching ==
Redding has taught communications at Pace University and New York City College of Technology. He currently teaches at Seton Hall University. Prior to teaching, he was a talk radio broadcaster working afternoons at WAOK in Atlanta He joined the station in January 2002. On February 6, 2003, Rob Redding's producer, Quiana Knox, 24, was tragically shot at her home in Atlanta, Georgia, following the show. Knox was a visiting student at Clark Atlanta University. The circumstances surrounding her death remain a mystery, and the case is still unsolved. His last show at the station came when management responded by "yanking off the air" the "popular" show just before it ended on May 30, 2003, as he left WAOK-AM over a contract grievance regarding his low pay of less than "30,000 a year." Redding goes by "America's Independent Voice" on the air. He was named one of the "100 most important radio talk hosts in America." He was a journalist at several newspapers including The Washington Times. He started his syndicated news and commentary show while at KMLB where he was also program director. He returned in radio syndication to WAOK in July 2010 and other cities a few years after leaving.

After about five years doing weekends, his show was also added to weekdays during that same time. The show was taken off the air at SiriusXM and continues as paid podcast Redding News Review Unrestricted hosted on Redding News Review website since 2014.

=== Reporting and punditry ===
The Atlanta Journal Constitution reported in February 2003 that Rob Redding asked Georgia Gov. Sonny Perdue "tough questions" about his possible affiliation with the Ku Klux Klan during the Republicans appearance on his talk show over a proposed referendum to keep the confederate battle symbol off the state of Georgia Flag. He later said that he asked the governor questions that listeners wanted to know in light of Perdue's decision to bring the lesser-known first national flag of the Confederacy, the "Stars and Bars."

In 2004, Redding reported on NBC anchor and managing editor Brian Williams saying that there were bigger issues than newsroom diversity. The comments resulted in a meeting between the National Association of Black Journalists and the NBC.

In 2007, Redding broke news of racist threats made against black columnist Leonard Pitts.

In May 2011, Redding got into a verbal altercation with Rush Limbaugh when he asked Michael Steele, the former chairman of the Republican National Committee, about a skit in which a Limbaugh staffer "reinterpreted" his criticism of Barack Obama's immigration speech in ebonics.

In 2012, Redding was a syndicated talk radio host on SiriusXM where he hosted "Where's the Change? Why Neither Obama nor the GOP Can Solve America's Problems," at Temple University and Connecticut College where he discussed the impact of talk radio on the 2012 presidential election.

In 2013, Redding interviewed recording artist Stromae about racism in Europe. Stromae spoke frankly about being called a "monkey", which inspired the singers hit Formidable.

In 2017, Redding's reported CoverGirl's James Charles comments about "chubby Black women", Indians and Mexicans in 2017 prompting Charles to apologize for his comments.

In 2020, Redding's interview of Texas A&M University professor Tommy Curry resulted in over 80 death threats directed to Curry after his comments were misunderstood.

Redding occasionally features in the National Public Radio Roundtable feature. Redding has been quoted on two occasions in The Associated Press, The Washington Post and The New York Times as a participant in "America in One Room."

=== Writing ===
Redding has written 19 bestselling books on Amazon's list, including Graphic Graphite: Bucking as a Challenge to Racial Narrative, Black Power in the age of Artificial Supremacy, Smeared, Target, Dark Soul and The Professor: Witnessing White Power (2019).

Redding's 19th book Graphic Graphite: Bucking as a Challenge to Racial Narrative, released the week of Juneteenth 2026, uses slave narratives to depict scenes of bucking in his Constructive Expressionistic art style. He states that his ConEX drawings begin with covering the paper in graphite and then erasing it to reveal human forms. He said the book could not be searched on the site, possibly due to its graphic content. The North Dallas Gazette reported that the book reached No. 1 on Amazon in the Conceptual Art and Art Psychology categories.

His 18th published work, Black Power in the Age of Artificial Supremacy, which includes a chapter by Kwet Yung Redding-Shim, reached No. 1 on Amazon's Machine Theory list in January 2026. Coverage of the book notes that Redding discusses a concept he calls “Robootology,” which he defines as the study of how artificial intelligence and robotics, including questions about emerging forms of sentience, might challenge or unsettle systems of white supremacy.

In an opinion column published in the North Dallas Gazette, Tennessee Tribune, and The Buffalo Criterion, Redding argued that advances in artificial intelligence could undermine what he called the “myth of white supremacy.” He wrote that machines surpassing human labor and intellect might shift existing racial hierarchies, a view he referred to as “Artificial Supremacy.”

The Narrative Matters reported that the book argues artificial intelligence could be used to challenge existing power structures and expose racial bias in technology. The outlet wrote that the book presents AI as a possible tool for Black empowerment when its underlying structures and biases are addressed.

According to Upscale magazine, Redding's 17th and 10th overall No. 1 bestselling book, New Identities: Unmasking Male Racist Transphobia, is an "essential text" that is "riveting as it exposes Republicans' foray into identity politics, which he calls "Identity Inversion," where racist, transphobic, mainly white men masquerade as the oppressed." According to Consciousness Magazine, his 16th book, Ritual, was No. 1 on Amazon and has been described as "a nearly 200-page investigation into the complex relationship between organized religion and societal norms," offering a "profound rethinking of religious practices" and being called "groundbreaking."

In 2023, his 15th book Unquotable was said to be "filled with powerful illustrations created by Redding, while his witty writings unravel issues of race, class, politics and sexuality", according to New York's Black Star News. The paper reported several months earlier that his brand new book Africa: How it can save the World dealing with where to go in time of a nuclear war was "his 14th book and seventh overall No.1 and 5th consecutive No. 1." In 2023, his book 13th book "Smeared", also reached No. 1 and compromised his MFA thesis on ConEx at Pratt Institute framed around "his powerful personal story," according to Black Star News.

Redding had his third consecutive No. 1 on Amazon.com with Target: Unwrapping Racism on August 30, 2021, a book that "ripped away the veil hiding the genesis of racism" and introduced "Visual Geographic Grounding"; it was his fifth No. 1 out of 12 consecutive bestsellers on the platform, following Dark Soul (No. 1 in summer 2020) and The Professor: Witnessing White Power (No. 2019 No. 1, later adapted into a stage play); Redding, "who is also a top-selling artist, artwork entitled 'Target' graces the book's plain white cover. This black circular 34X34 artwork on unstretched canvas is a depiction of an infant in utero riddled with two bullet holes."

The Industry reported on May 26, 2020, that The Professor: Witnessing White Power was "Rob Redding's new hard-hitting book on gays in black leadership recently topped two of Amazon's coveted lists of new books," detailing "how gay interracial relationships and encounters have shaped black power, dissects the sex lives of Jean-Michel Basquiat, James Baldwin, Marvin Gaye, Richard Pryor, and Malcolm X, and contains explosive new information about Basquiat's relationship with Klaus Nomi," noting that "Redding—the first out bisexual black radio talk show host—has a national talk show listened to by a black mainstream audience in 20 states, has taught at Pace and City Tech universities in New York City, and has published several influential works on race and sexuality."

Sinister Citizen, Redding's only foray into fiction, explores the tumultuous landscape of President Trump's America, released in 2017, was said to be "intriguing" and "fascinating" by KKXX, and reached top 30 on Amazon. Rob Redding's Out Loud, which debuted at No. 2 on Amazon's "Hot New Releases" in the Gay and Lesbian Biographies and Memoirs category on November 6, 2017, is described by GAYLETTER as a "juicy" tell-all autobiography "of race and sexuality." CBS remarked that his personal stories of bisexual interracial dating "came as a surprise to his personal friends and many who listen to 'The Redding News Review'," and called the book, which appears to be no longer available, "shocking."

Why Black Lives Matter: How Borigination Explains How to Get Police and Whites to Treat Blacks Like People, officially released on July 6, 2015, and described as a "new best-selling book explaining how to possibly end police brutality and racism," with a foreword penned by Dr. Lewis R. Gordon, reached No. 1 on Amazon's "Hot New Releases."

Unthinkable: Poems, Philosophies and Paintings, released on July 7, 2014, was his "sixth consecutive best seller with a Top 5 and Top 10 appearance respectively on Amazon.com."

Not a Nonviolent Negro: How I Survived Obama debuted at No. 1 on Amazon on March 6, 2013, and was described by Consciousness Magazine as "ground-breaking; a modern blueprint to fearless literature," and given a rating of 4 out of 5 stars, the book is considered a "written composition consumed with extreme meaning, highlighting Redding's boldness, confidence and honesty."

Disrupter: Pathway to Political Independence, Redding's second best-selling book, debuted at No. 1 on Amazon's "Hot New Releases" in "Political Reference" on August 13, 2012, described By Urban Radio Nation as a "new book on how to live a politically independent life," providing essays on how to answer questions about being an independent and giving references for independents.

Resurrection: A Historical Anthology of Two Forgotten African-American Philosophers, Redding's third best-selling book, was released on April 4, 2012, and reached No. 3 on Amazon's "Hot New Releases" list; Redding said the book unearths two forgotten black philosophers, offering analysis on why John Jasper and William Whipper are considered philosophers, with philosopher Dr. Lewis Gordon writing the foreword "The Underside of American Philosophy," while Dr. Tommy J. Curry said the book "will contribute to opening up some of the thoughts and primary material for people to think about Black philosophy," marking Redding's second best-selling book in less than 90 days, following Where's the Change? Why Neither Obama, nor the GOP Can Solve America's Problems, which landed among the top 30 books on Amazon in February, and was his second book since Hired Hatred: Why Politicians and the Political Prejudices They Tout Are Mutually Exclusive from Good Government, released in 2004.

Where's the Change?: Why Neither Obama, nor the GOP Can Solve America's Problems, released on January 13, 2012, peaked at No. 30 on Amazon. In the book, Redding argued "that neither President Obama nor the Republicans can solve the country's problems."

Additionally, Redding has two academic articles. He wrote "Black voices, White power: Members of the Black press make meaning of media hegemony" in the Journal of Black Studies He wrote the "Resolution of Risk" in "The Journal of the International Public Debate Association."

== Black Music Radio ==
Redding started in media in music radio working at a few stations. Redding, who went by the name Tony Smoove during his time at WIBB-FM in Macon, Georgia, began making waves in the radio industry at 20 years old, with the Macon Telegraph describing him as "not afraid to speak his mind" on his nightly talk show "What's on Your Mind at Nine," where his outspoken anti-gang stance led to death threats, though he reflected, "I don't think about it too much, but it's something that I keep in the back of my mind."

He also was on staff at the station when it reached No. 1 in 1997, marking "the first time a black-oriented station has been on top of the Macon radio market," according to the Macon Telegraph.

He departed from the top-rated station, citing that management was stifling him from apparently "pushing" rap during his "2 1/2 years" there.

According to the Macon Telegraph, "Tony Smoove's Aircheck Volume 1" (1998), which featured "samples of Smoove's on-air patter with callers," was released after he joined the crosstown rival HipHop station WFXM. The disc also marked the first appearances of rapper Bubba Sparxxx, who was once in the bass group One Card Shi, and rapper Sonny Spoon.

He departed from that station after about a year, apparently to pursue news and talk radio in April 1999, according to the Macon Telegraph.

Since leaving Black music radio, he's ventured into talk radio, authored books, continued his musical pursuits, and curated multimedia art exhibitions. His music albums include "Not a Nonviolent Negro" (2013) and "Unleash the Whip" (2012). Additionally, Redding narrated the film "Stay, Brady, Stay" (2009). According to MediaBistro, Redding's influence extends beyond the airwaves and visual artifacts, as he was voted the third "Hottest Media Types, Male, On Air" for his broadcast show in 2008. In the fall of 2024, he joined Ikon Models, further diversifying his portfolio of creative expressions, as reported by Consciousness Magazine.

== Art ==
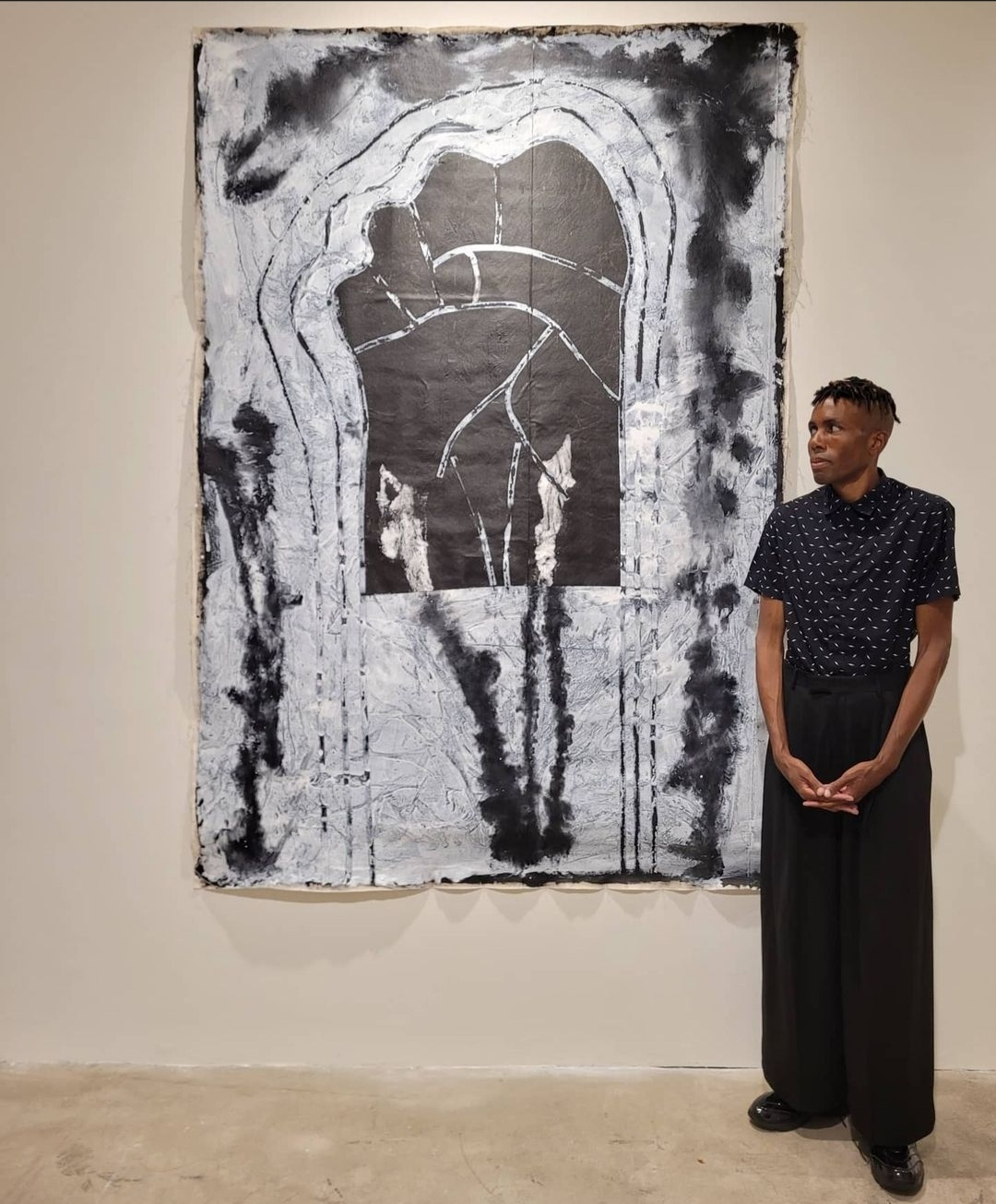
Rob Redding in front of Black Power: Unapologetically Militant (70X93) 2021

In a 2025 interview with Canvas Rebel, Redding discussed the pricing of his work Middle Passage, which was listed at 8,000, and spoke about the influence of his family on his artistic practice. He described his father as a minister, his mother as an educator, and his sister Keena as an actor, singer, and playwright who encouraged his work. In the same interview, he said that he paints nude as part of an approach to vulnerability in his art.

According to Consciousness Magazine, Rob Redding held a "highly successful solo art show" titled "Black & White" at the Morningside Heights Library in New York City, which ran for the entire month of September 2024. A few days later, Redding also "rocked the queer art world" when he exhibited a collection of "10 avant-garde reflective images at the Soho Project Space in New York."

In June 2023, Redding, who holds an MFA and MA in communication, was called "The Master of Commentary and Canvas" as Consciousness Magazine placed him on the cover of its publication. The magazine said Redding makes "monochrome look magnificent on every canvas he touches" and called his work "racy." A few months later, Redding was featured in The New Criterion for his work "Kenosha 7: Pow, Pow, Pow, Pow, Pow, Pow, Pow and Jacob Blake's Life is Changed Forever" in a show entitled "There is a Certain Slant of Light" at Pratt Manhattan Gallery.

In May 2023, New York's Black Star News called him a "mixture of bright, bold, and brash" for his "salacious" art piece "Bad Words" which contains gay slurs on mirrors to confront and provoke conversation on presidential candidate Ron DeSantis over his "don't say gay" bill. Earlier that same year, his "Constructive Expressionism" style was described as "highly original" by Black Star News, which covered his new book about his art called Smeared (2023).

In 2017, art reviewer Per Larson called his work "iconic" and compared him to "James Baldwin" because he once lived in Europe.

In 2018 he exhibited his first Manhattan solo show BIG BLACK ̶C̶O̶C̶K̶ CANVAS: SIZE matters – in ART! at the NoHoM55 Gallery in Chelsea in 2018. Redding's artwork Black Power: Unapologetically Militant was exhibited in the Fridman Gallery and later sold for $10,000. His work appeared in the May 2021 edition of Art in America.

== Work ==
=== Solo exhibitions ===
- "Unspoken: Black & White." Morningside Heights Library, New York, N.Y., September 3, 2024, to September 30, 2024.
- "BIG BLACK ̶C̶O̶C̶K̶ CANVAS: SIZE matters – in ART!" NoHo M55 Gallery, New York, N.Y., September 4, 2018, to September 22, 2018.
- "Monodramatic." Midoma Gallery, New York, N.Y., September 16, 2017, to October 20, 2017.
- "Black on White." Producers' Club Theaters & Bar Gallery, New York, N.Y., November 5, 2016, to December 1, 2017.
- "Black on White." Ouchi Gallery, Brooklyn, N.Y., November 15, 2016, to November 21, 2016.
- "2nd Friday ArtStroll at Castleberry Hill in Atlanta." The Ice Cream Loft located on 322 Peter Street No. 2, Atlanta, Ga., March 11, 2011.
- "Smeared." Warehouse, Washington, D.C., February 1, 2006, to February 26, 2006.
- "The Black Show." The Apex, Atlanta, Ga., August 2004.
- "The Black Show." Brenau University, Atlanta, Ga., February 2004.
- Fayette County Library, Fayette County, Ga., May - June 1990.
- Fayette County Junior High School Library, Fayette County, Ga., February - March 1989.

=== Published works ===
- Graphic Graphite: Bucking as a Challenge to Racial Narrative. New York, NY: RCI, 2026. Distributed by Amazon. ASIN B0H5BMVV5Q
- Black Power in the Age of Artificial Supremacy. New York, NY: RCI, 2026. Distributed by Amazon. ASIN 0GDQQ12LN
- New Identities: Unmasking Male Racist Transphobia. New York, NY: RCI, 2025. Distributed by Amazon. ASIN B0DSWNCH39
- Ritual. New York, NY: RCI, 2024. Distributed by Amazon. ASIN B0DLKFPQ9V
- Unquotable. New York, NY: RCI, 2023. Distributed by Amazon.ASIN B0CH3PMK7B
- Africa: How It Can Save the World. New York, NY: RCI, 2023. Distributed by Amazon. ASIN B0BX71NG9K
- Smeared. New York, NY: RCI, 2023. Distributed by Amazon. ASIN B0BS939QHW
- Target: Unwrapping Racism. New York, NY: RCI, 2021. Distributed by Amazon. ASIN B09F4QS3LC
- Dark Soul. New York, NY: RCI, 2020. Distributed by Amazon. ASIN B08FZK1P8W
- The Professor: Witnessing White Power. New York, NY: RCI, 2019. ISBN 978-1692336233. Distributed by Amazon. ASIN B07R7X3K8T
- Sinister Citizen. New York, NY: RCI, 2017. Distributed by Amazon. ASIN B01N2ATLG2
- Out Loud. New York, NY: RCI, 2017. Distributed by Amazon. ASIN Nolongeravailable
- Why Black Lives Matter: How Borigination. Atlanta: RCI, 2015. Distributed by Amazon. ASIN B010VXXGT2
- Unthinkable: Poems, Philosophies and Paintings. Atlanta: RCI, 2014. Distributed by Amazon. ASIN B00LKZJMQM
- Not a Nonviolent Negro: How I Survived Obama. Atlanta: RCI, 2013. Distributed by Amazon. ASIN B00BOZ8WSW
- Disrupter: Pathway to Political Independence. Atlanta: RCI, 2012. Distributed by Amazon. ASIN B008WXKELM
- Resurrection: A Historical Anthology of Two Forgotten African American Philosophers. Atlanta: RCI, 2012. Distributed by Amazon. ASIN B007QZXBEY
- Where's the Change?: Why Neither Obama, nor the GOP Can Solve America's Problems. Atlanta: RCI, 2012. Distributed by Amazon. ASIN B006WGS0US
- Hired Hatred: Why Politicians and the Political Prejudices They Tout Are Mutually Exclusive from Good Government. Atlanta: RCI, 2005. Distributed by Amazon. ASIN B0051ADWOK

=== Journal articles ===
- Black voices, White power: Members of the Black press make meaning of media hegemony. Journal of Black Studies, 48(2), 143–164. doi:10.1177/0021934716681152 (2017)
- "Resolution of Risk." (2018)

=== Filmography ===
- Sutherlin, John. Stay, Brady, Stay. Narrated by Rob Redding. 2009. Film.

=== Discography ===
- Not a Nonviolent Negro. Amazon.com, 2013. ASIN B00BNYEOHC
- Unleash the Whip. Amazon.com, 2012. ASIN B00AKCLBLU
- Redding, Rob. Tony Smoove's Aircheck Volume 1. Atlanta: Crystal Castle productions/Rude Records/Ichiban Records, 1998.
