= Redding News Review =

American news aggregation website

- Website type: News site
- Available in: English
- Owner: Rob Redding
- Creator: Rob Redding
- Editor: Rob Redding
- Website: reddingnewsreview.com
- Advertising: Yes
- Registration: Yes
- Launched: 2002; 24 years ago Atlanta, Georgia, U.S.
- Current status: Active

Redding News Review was a SiriusXM radio show that developed into a subscriber-supported podcast. It focuses on Black news and was founded by Rob Redding.

== Production ==
Rob Redding founded Redding News Review to compete with mainstream news organizations and cover under-reported issues.

Redding News Review was hosted on SiriusXM between 2012 and 2013 and later became a podcast. The podcast was named "Redding News Review Unrestricted" in 2014.

=== Content ===
A 2013 interview with Stromae explored the extent of racism in Belgium.

The show has a regular feature called Talking Tough with Curry featuring discussions with Tommy J. Curry. A 2012 episode resulted in Curry receiving death threats after Curry's jokes about violence against white people were taken out of context and shared online by journalist Rod Dreher.

== Reception and influence ==
In May 2024, Urban Insite wrote that the podcast has celebrated a "decade and 2000th episode this week dominating Black news online with his podcast 'Redding News Review Unrestricted'".

In August 2011, the web site appears to also have been targeted by The Washington Times newspaper, where Redding once worked.

In November 2011, a report about President Obama being concerned about the Troy Davis case, which was denied by the White House.

The site won three Black Web Awards in 2008, 2009 and 2010.

The site has been placed in the "vanguard of Internet news sites." The site has also been called a "clearing house for African-American news."
