= African Hebrew Israelites in Israel =

African-American claimants of Israelite descent

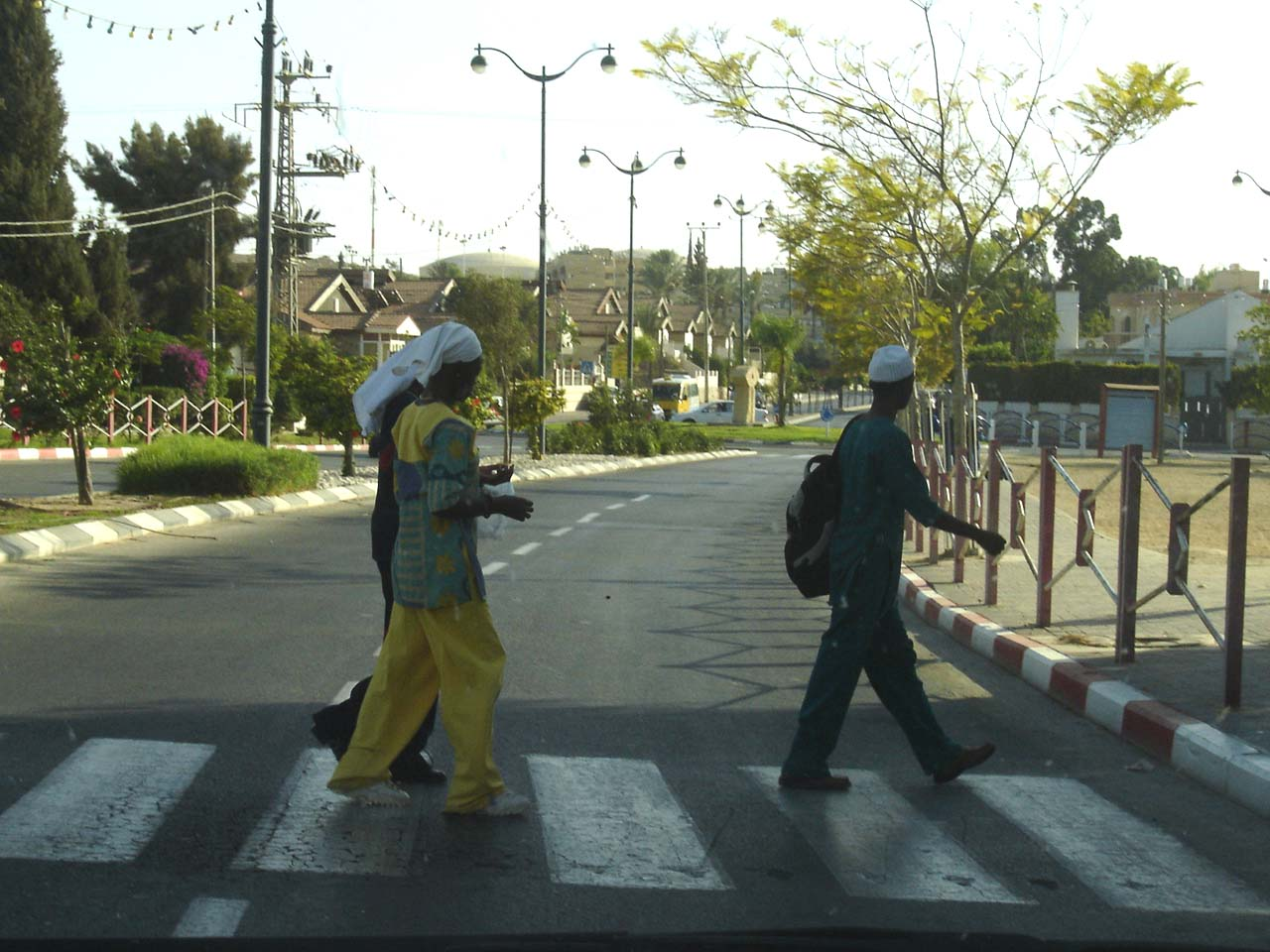
A group of African Hebrew Israelites in Dimona, 2005

The African Hebrew Israelites in Israel (Note: Also known as the Hebrew Israelites of Jerusalem, the Hebrew Israelites, the Black Hebrew Israelites, or simply the Black Hebrews or the Black Israelites.) comprise a new religious movement that is now mainly based in Dimona. Officially self-identifying as the African Hebrew Israelite Nation of Jerusalem, they originate from African American Ben Carter who later renamed himself to Ben Ammi Ben-Israel who immigrated to the State of Israel in 1970. The community claims Israelite descent in line with the philosophy of the Black Hebrew Israelites, who believe that Black people in the United States are descended from the Twelve Tribes of Israel and thus rightfully belong to the Land of Israel. As of 2012, their total population stood at about 5,000 people.

Believing that they were Jews by blood (i.e., through the Hebrews or Israelites), the community first settled in Liberia in 1967, where they were not welcomed by the Liberian government. Later moving to Israel, they were recognized as non-Jews by the Israeli government and by Israeli religious authorities. A number of the African Hebrew Israelites were illegal immigrants in Israel and were thus deported, prompting allegations from the community that the Israeli government's conduct against them was racist. Since 2004, however, some African Hebrew Israelites have been granted permanent residency and have enlisted in the Israel Defense Forces.

Many of the community's beliefs were developed on the basis of revelations experienced by African-American steel worker Ben Carter, who claimed that the angel Gabriel had called on him to return his people—the "true" Children of Israel—to what is often referred to as the Holy Land in the Abrahamic religions. Born a Baptist Christian, Carter later changed his name to Ben Ammi Ben-Israel (Hebrew: בן עמי בן-ישראל) and began rallying other African Americans to his cause. He rejected Judaism and Christianity, but asserted that the Jewish Bible was still divine and claimed that Abraham and Moses were Black people, while also perceiving Jesus as one of many messiahs. Some of Carter's statements and the community's beliefs have led to accusations of antisemitism against them: he alleged that there was an international Jewish conspiracy through which the Israeli government maintained control over the Holy Land. Claiming that Black people were the "true inheritors of Israel" suffering under "Euro-gentile dominion" in the United States, Carter stated that Israeli Jews and Palestinian Arabs in the Holy Land had a false tradition of being descended from Isaac and Ishmael, respectively, and were instead descended from European Crusaders.

== Origins ==
The group was founded in Chicago by former steel worker Ben Carter (1939–2014, also known as Ben Ammi Ben-Israel). In his early twenties Carter was given the name Ben Ammi by Rabbi Reuben of the Chicago Congregation of Ethiopian Hebrews (Not Beta Israel). Ben Ammi was working in an airline factory when he first discovered the Black Hebrew movement and its philosophy. According to Ben Ammi, in 1966, at the age of 27, he had a vision in which the Archangel Gabriel called him to take his people, African Americans, back to the Holy Land of Israel.

Ammi and his followers draw on a long tradition in black American culture which is based on the belief that black Americans are the descendants of the Ancient Israelites (Ammi cites Charles Harrison Mason of Mississippi, William Saunders Crowdy of Virginia, Bishop William Boome of Tennessee, Charles Price Jones of Mississippi, and Elder Saint Samuel of Tennessee as early exponents of black descent from the Israelites).

They are also influenced by the teachings of the Jamaican proponent of Black nationalism, Marcus Garvey (1887–1940), and the black civil rights milieu in 1960s America, including figures such as the Black Panthers and Malcolm X. From these figures and their teachings, they have incorporated elements of black separatism as well as the doctrine which advocates the repatriation of the African Diaspora to its ancestral lands in a "return to Africa", of which they consider Israel to be a part. To them, Israel is located in Northeast Africa instead of West Asia.

The inspiration to move to Israel was born from several components. One component was the hardship which black community members faced within America as well as within American culture, especially in Chicago in the 1960s, at the height of the Civil rights movement. Another component was the community's willingness to form a confident and positive African identity, as opposed to the damaging identity which the group felt it carried in America. The last component was this spout of religious and spiritual connection to a long-standing culture, an ancient history and a Promised Land. An additional factor may have been the expectation of a coming apocalyptic war in which America would be destroyed.

== Settlement in Liberia (1967–1969) ==
Ben Ammi and 350 of his followers first settled in Liberia in 1967. There, they built a community which adhered to the "laws of righteousness". Prince Rakhamim, who was a community leader at that time, described what living in Liberia did for the community:

We chose to stay there about two and a half years in order to get rid of the foolishness of America before making way to the land of Israel. To make a person born again. To die from the hell we came out of, to get rid of it—to learn to get rid of the hate... to get rid of our bitterness... Liberia was always conceived as the place where we would learn to be righteous. Those of us who wanted to do right shedded off the hate and came home to Israel.

== Status in Israel ==
It is unclear whether Israel was always the end-goal for the community, or whether Ben Ammi received another vision in 1969, when the community was in Liberia, telling him to take the community to its real promised land: Israel. The African Hebrew Israelite community believes that this ambiguity does not lessen its desire to establish a home in Israel. The group aimed to immigrate to Israel under the Israeli Law of Return, which states that all Jews who emigrate to Israel will be granted citizenship. However, in order to qualify for citizenship under the Law of Return, a person must be born a Jew, or he or she must be the child or grandchild of a Jew, or he or she must have converted to Judaism, and he or she must not be an active member of another religion.

Because Ben Ammi and his followers did not meet this requirement, they did not qualify for Israeli citizenship. This deterrent did not stop them from moving to Israel. In 1969, the group began to move to Israel by using temporary visas. Most Black Hebrews entered Israel on tourist visas and they overstayed their visas by living in Israel as illegal immigrants.

Initially, the African Hebrew Israelites asserted that they were the only rightful heirs of the Land of Israel. They refused to convert to Judaism and they also asserted that most Israeli Jews were not the descendants of the ancient Israelites. By the late 1980s, the group tempered their beliefs. They came to see Israel as a nation of many cultures, races, and religions.

Members of the group continued to arrive and settle in the desert town of Dimona. For two decades, their population continued to grow through natural increase and illegal immigration. Throughout the 1970s, tensions between the group and the government grew as the group faced low employment, inadequate housing, and attempted deportations, while the government considered its members illegal aliens. Ben Ammi accused the government of practicing racism and he also accused it of occupying the holy land, he did this by claiming that "The greatest conspiracy ever conceived in the minds of men was the creation of a National Homeland for Jewish People."

In 1973, the International League for the Rights of Man rejected the group's claims, stating that the group made no attempt to comply with the citizenship laws of Israel. In 1981, a six-person Black Americans to Support Israel Committee delegation assessed all aspects of the treatment of the community and concluded that racism was not the cause of its problems. Although the delegation's leader Bayard Rustin called Ben Ammi "a dictator" without "the same moral standards as democratic leaders", the other members of the delegation disassociated themselves from Rustin's accusation.

They are generally not considered Jews in Israel. The Israeli government especially in the past refused to grant the group citizenship, while occasionally pursuing deportation.

In May 1990, the group was granted tourist status and visas that permitted its members to work. In 1992, the Congressional Black Caucus of the United States Congress intervened, leading to the signing of an agreement which stated that the Black Hebrews would be granted temporary residency status if they did not receive new members. At the end of 2003, the group was granted permanent residency status by the Israeli Interior Ministry. It is believed that in 2009, Elyakim Ben-Israel became the first Black Hebrew to receive Israeli citizenship without converting to Judaism or marrying an Israeli. The Israeli government said that more Black Hebrews may be granted citizenship.

In 2004, Uriyahu Butler became the first member of the community to enlist in the Israel Defense Forces. The IDF agreed to accommodate some of the group's religious requirements, especially its dietary requirements.

Today, young men (and, to a lesser degree, young women) from the African Hebrew community of Jerusalem serve in the IDF. They have also entered international sporting events and academic competitions under the Israeli flag; they have also represented Israel twice in the Eurovision Song Contest.

In April 2021, a spokesman for the Israeli government announced Israel's plans to deport dozens of members who had not received official status, including some who had lived their whole lives in Israel. 51 members of the community were ordered to leave their homes by September 23, 2021. In October 2021, the Beersheba court district issued an interim injunction that effectively halted the deportations. In May 2025 all remaining families were granted Temporary Resident status, which has previously been the first step toward citizenship for members.

== Way of life ==
The group maintains a vegan diet, citing Genesis 1:29, "And God said, Behold, I have given you every herb bearing seed, which is upon the face of all the earth, and every tree, in the which is the fruit of a tree yielding seed; to you it shall be for meat." They appear to have become vegan in the early 1970s, although some members were vegetarian prior. While they value non-violence, the primary motive for their veganism appears to be health-based: mirroring a Rabbinic tradition, they argue that meat-eating is linked to humanity's fallen state, and must be overcome to attain righteousness. They practice abstinence from alcohol, other than the naturally fermented wine which they make themselves, as well as abstinence from both illegal and pharmaceutical drugs, so as to stay within the "cycles of life".

The group grows much of its own food and its members are authorized to be organic growers by the Israel Bio-Organic Agricultural Association.

Members wear only clothing made from natural fibers, which are sewn by members of the community, and all must bear blue thread and fringes as mandated in the Bible (Deut. 22:11-12, Num.15:37–40). Men wear a form of kippah (head-covering) and beards.

The group practices "polygyny", meaning that a man can marry several wives (up to six). Within the community this is termed "Divine Marriage", being based on Biblical examples such as King David. Polygyny is not required, constituting approximately 37% of marriages in 1992. Polygamy is illegal in Israel.

=== Beliefs ===
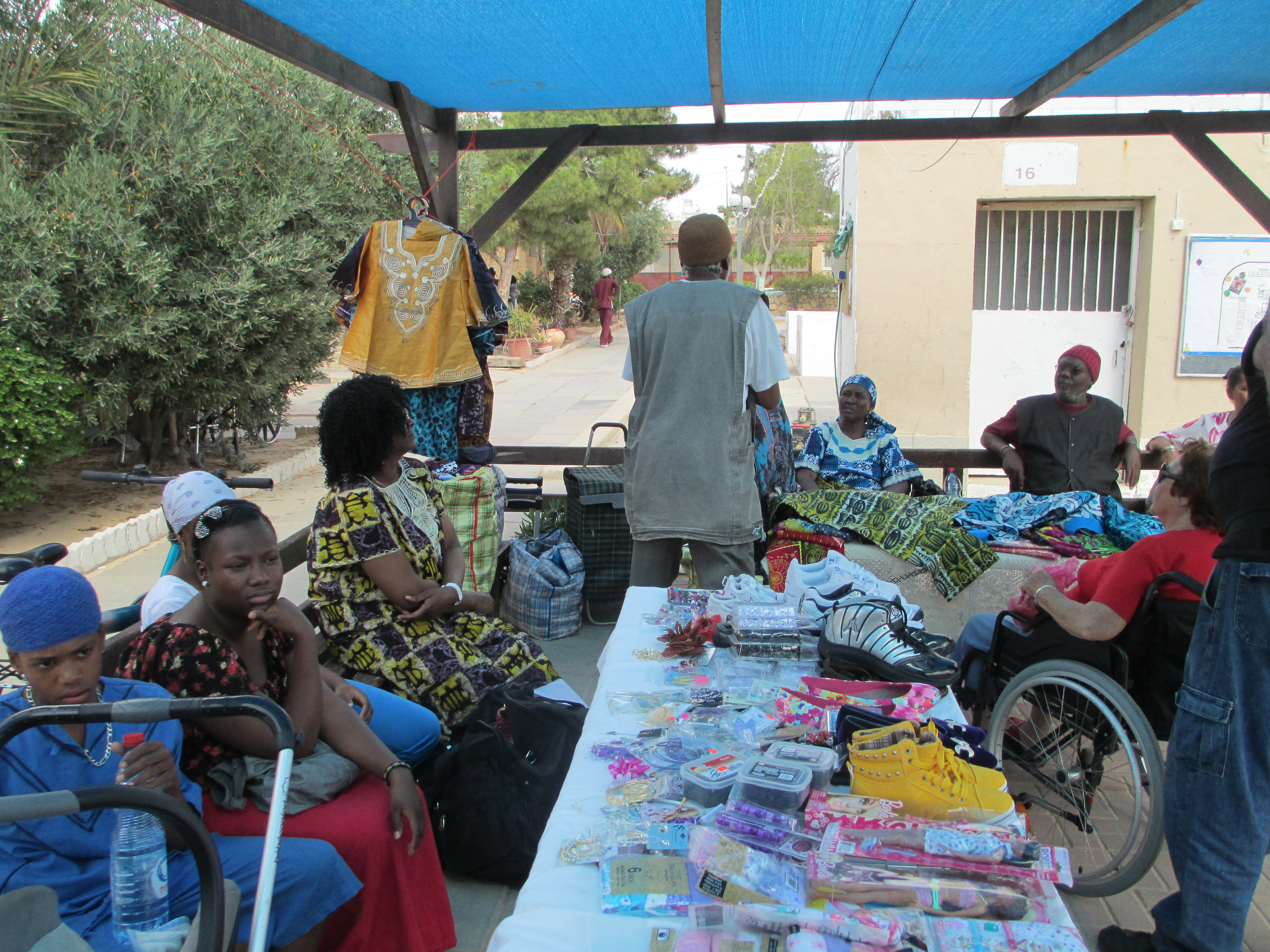
The community in Dimona, Israel, in 2013

The group believes that the ancient Israelites are the ancestors of Black Americans. It objects to the use of the term 'Jew' based on its belief that black Americans are descended from all 12 tribes, not just the Tribe of Judah. Even though they reject the religious forms of both Judaism and Christianity, the Black Hebrews maintain the belief in the divine inspiration of the Tanakh, and they also value the New Testament as a record of the words of Yeshuah, one man in an ongoing line of 'messiahs' who were sent by God to keep the people of Israel in the ways of righteousness. The core of the group's lifestyle is the Tanakh. Ben Ammi claims that "the Law and the Prophets...are the light; they are the essence of what is required to set man on the path and show him the way back to his Maker." However, the group rejects the traditions of Rabbinic Judaism, including the Talmud, based on its belief that they are inauthentic as opposed to the Hebrew religion.

Ben Ammi claims that black Africans are the victims of "a cruel plot to control us, an international religious plot that came about as a result of Blacks disobeying the law and commandments of God." The enslavement of black Africans is seen as punishment for straying from the righteous path and he cites an "oral tradition that our people were cursed by God for violating His laws, statutes and commandments." He links this oral tradition to Deuteronomy 28:68, which speaks of a second captivity in a second Egypt which the Israelites would be carried to in ships. The "Euro-gentile" establishment hatched "a deliberate scheme to conceal the truth that ancient Hebrews were Black" and it also "perpetuated the white Jesus deception".

In an attempt to overcome the history of slavery in the United States, Ammi argues that it is essential to "reexamine and redefine all things...we must question every facet of existence under Euro-gentile dominion." The ability to name and classify the word and social concept which Ammi calls "The Power to Define", which is in the wrong hands, is "one of the greatest weapons that can be used to control men and nations," is the key to salvation from past oppression. Thus, Ammi claims that true freedom can never be found within a society that is intrinsically corrupt but can only be attained by establishing a new society based solely on the laws of God: "No government, no party or system can bring salvation unto the Children of God...Their salvation is only of God."

Based on the Hebrew word eved (עבד, meaning 'slave' or 'servant'), Ammi has argued that the distinction between work and worship is false – in fact, the activity we pursue with our lives is both our work and our worship. Therefore, "every job that does not enhance God as creator is the worship of the devil. There is no neutral position."

However, Ammi's concern is not solely for his own people but for the whole of humanity – the role of the Black Hebrew Israelite community is to serve as "a light unto the gentiles": "Black Americans...were initially chosen by God to guide the world out of its state of ignorance." Recently the group has also begun to claim that Hebrew status is not solely from genealogy, but can be conferred by spiritual behaviour.

Ammi does not believe in the existence of an afterlife; he prefers to focus on life on earth: "Heaven is the reality of the righteous as they live, not a place for spirits after death."

As well as claiming that Jews are not the descendants of the ancient Israelites, they also claim that the members of the Palestinian Arab population are not the descendants of Ishmael: "Our studies and experience have shown that the present-day inhabitants of this region are not the original people of the land. The majority of those today defined by modern historians as Arabs, are veritably the descendents of European Crusaders."

The group believes that the value system of a society is seen through its culture. According to one source, it is therefore "important that our clothing, music, food and language reflect the glory and the higher standards of Yah (God)."

== Accusations of antisemitism ==
On several occasions, Ben Ammi and the Black Hebrew community have been accused of antisemitism. As well as denying the Israelite heritage of world Jewry and its claim to the land of Israel, the stalemate which existed between the Black Hebrew community and Israel in the late 1970s led to heightened tensions and according to The Jerusalem Post, "Ben Ammi mounted a worldwide public relations offensive against the government that dripped with antisemitism. Community newspapers compared the Israelis to Nazis and they also included images of money-grabbing Jews and other stereotypical images". However, relations improved during the 1990s as the Black Hebrew community distanced itself from the ineffective extremist stance which it had taken up in earlier years. Since then, the group has become a valuable part of both the Dimona community and the wider Israeli society and it has also pursued integration in ways such as volunteering to serve in the IDF.

In 2011, the Georgia General Assembly passed a resolution which "recognize(s) the Hebrew Israelite Community for its service to the nation of Israel and commends their 40 years of history." Citing the fact that the Dimona-based community is "one of the largest urban kibbutzim in Israel" and "has attracted visitors from around the world because of its healthy lifestyle and organic agriculture," the Assembly concluded and declared that "the culture and tradition of the Hebrew Israelite Community is a rich one, and the Community's numerous contributions are worthy of recognition."

In response to concerns about anti-Jewish prejudice and stereotyping that arose during its formative years in Israel, community leader Prince Immanuel Ben Yehuda simply states that they have "grown up." "As you look back over 30 years you realize that this has grown from the ground up. We've been here 30 years, that means we've grown up together... Our children have gone to schools (and) played in games together so there is another kind of relationship that has grown up."

In August 2008, the Village of Peace received a visit from Israel's president, Shimon Peres, who told the Hebrew Israelites "Your community is beloved in Israel...You give the country happiness and song and hope for a better world"

In March 2012, during the community's annual "New World Passover" celebration in honor of their historic "exodus" from America in 1967, the Israeli Prime Minister Benjamin Netanyahu expressed appreciation for "the cooperative society that is working towards the inclusion of the Hebrew Israelite community in Israeli society at large," and he also declared that their experience in the land is "an integral part of the Israeli experience."

The Black Hebrews still express concerns as to the direction in which Israel is heading. During an interview with Haaretz, a popular Israeli newspaper, Ben Ammi stated that "We must understand that peace will never come, and true freedom will never come, by way of politicians... There's a major difference between the peace that was promised by the Creator and the peace that is being sought after by politicians." "We do give advice to politicians; because these individuals who are seen as leaders, if they would hear a message based upon truth, then it would influence that which they say they seek after – and that is peace. But without truth, and without spirituality, there can never be any genuine peace achieved in those lands."

== Institutions ==
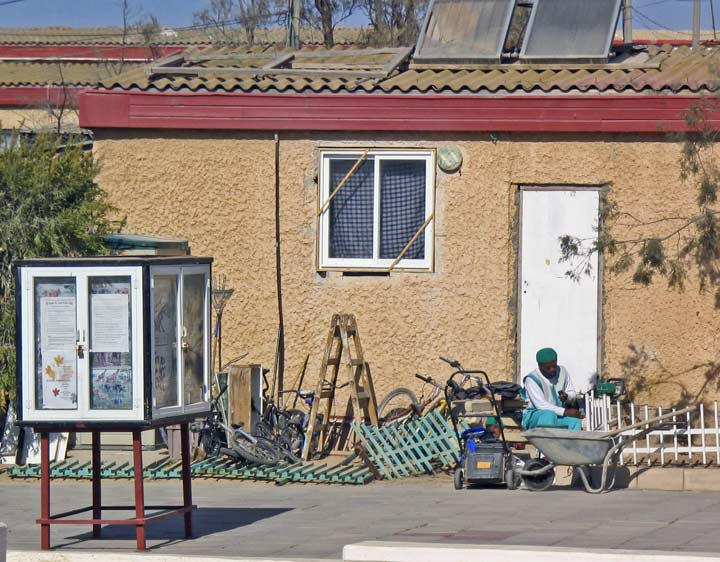
The urban village of Kfar Hashalom in 2006

The AHIJ’s institutions include:

- The School of the Prophets, a higher education academy, incorporating an international branch, The Institute of Regenerative Truth
- The Dr Martin Luther King Jr/ SCLC Ben Ammi Institute for a New Humanity, a research center for the study of non-violence
- The Middle East African Diaspora Unity Council, an NGO promoting the knowledge and interests of Africana peoples in Israel and the Middle East

The African Hebrew Development Agency (AHDA), also, is a non-governmental organization which operates primarily on the African continent. It specializes in "providing technical assistance, training and consultancy in essential areas... such as health, agriculture, rural development, environmental maintenance and related fields." The AHDA has also collaborated with indigenous African organizations to help mobilize the African Boreholes Initiative (ABI). ABI is a social enterprise built around the need to provide clean water to local African villages that would be otherwise incapable of accessing it.

=== Outreach ===
In April 2011, Ben Ammi led a seven-member delegation to South Africa to engage in discussions with Zulu king Goodwill Zwelithini and the South African government in an attempt to explore options of replicating the "Dimona Model" for community development in that country.

== See also ==
- African American–Jewish relations
- Ben-Ami Ben Israel
- Black Hebrew Israelites
- Jewish Indian theory
- Religion of black Americans
- Sister Wife, a documentary about the group
