= Dimona =

Dimona דִּימוֹנָה ديمونا
- City

Hebrew transcription(s)
  - ISO 259: Dimonah
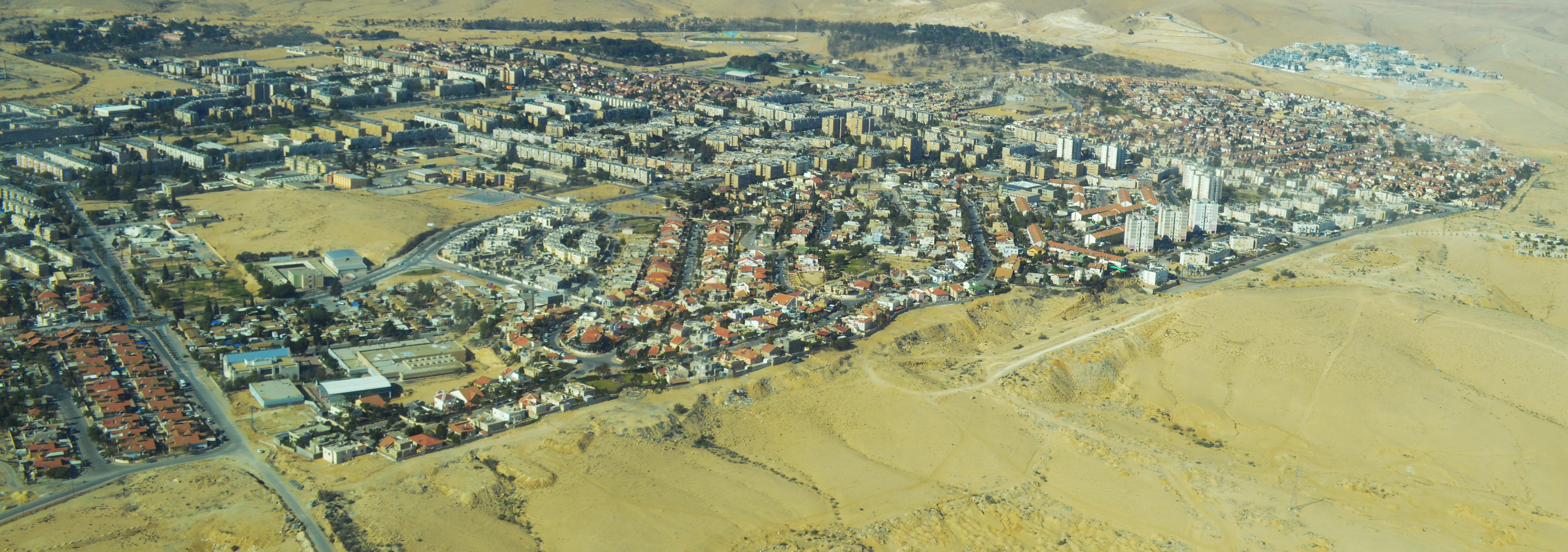
- Aerial view of Dimona

- Location within Northern Negev region of Israel Location within Israel
- Coordinates: 31°4′N 35°2′E
- Country: Israel
- District: Southern
- Subdistrict: Beersheba
- Natural Region: Northern Negev Mountains
- Founded: 1955

Government
  - Mayor: Benny Bitton

Area
  - Total: 29,877 dunams (29.877 km^{2}; 11.536 sq mi)

Population (2024)
  - Total: 39,590
  - Density: 1,325/km^{2} (3,432/sq mi)
- Website: http://www.dimona.muni.il

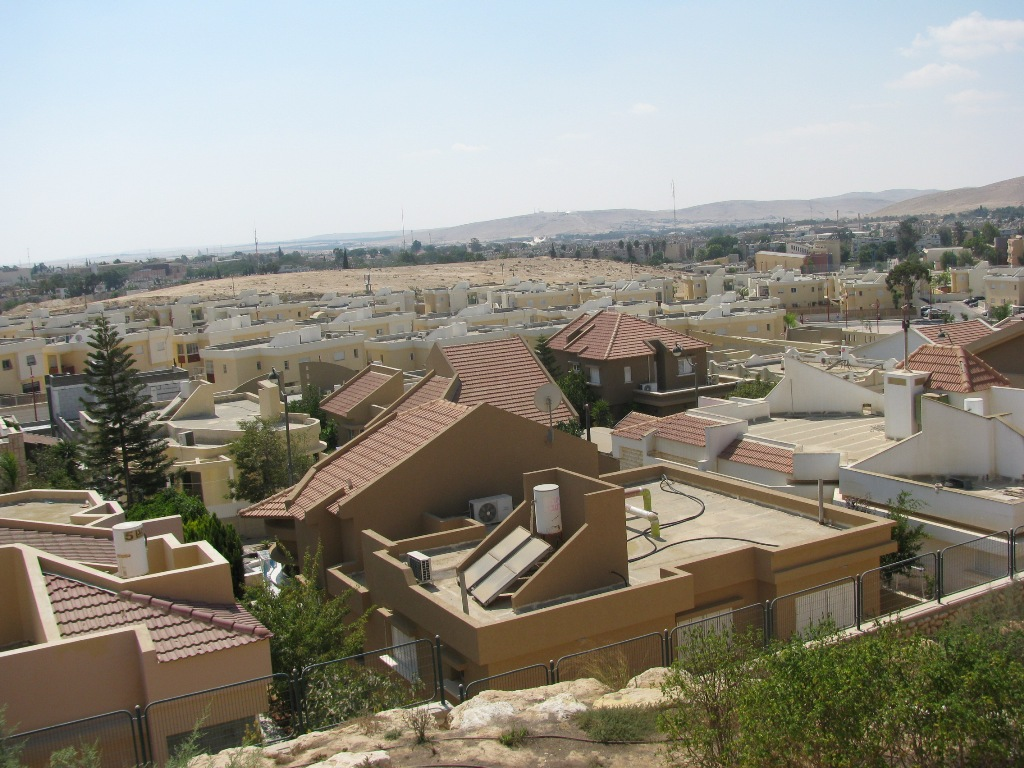
View of Dimona

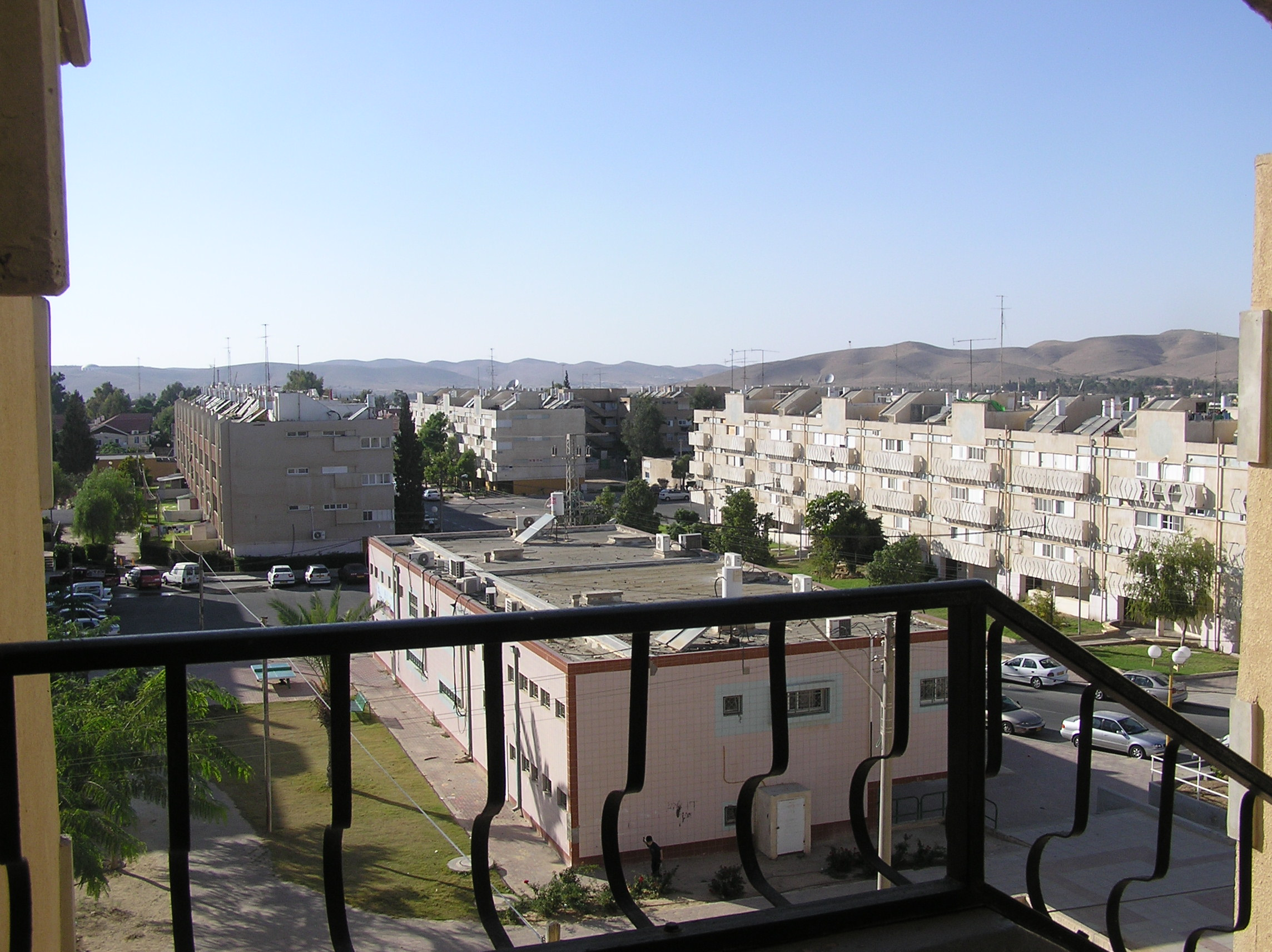
Apartment blocks in Dimona

Dimona (Hebrew: דִּימוֹנָה, Arabic: ديمونا) is an Israeli city in the Negev desert, 30 kilometres (19 mi) to the south-east of Beersheba and 35 kilometres (22 mi) west of the Dead Sea above the Arava valley in the Southern District of Israel. In 2024 its population was 39,590. The Shimon Peres Negev Nuclear Research Center, colloquially known as the Dimona Reactor, is located 13 kilometres (8.1 mi) southeast of the city.

== Etymology ==
The Negev Naming Committee chose the name based upon that of a biblical town, mentioned in Joshua 15:21-22, on the basis that "the sound of this name had been preserved in the Arabic name Harabat Umm Dumna."

== History ==
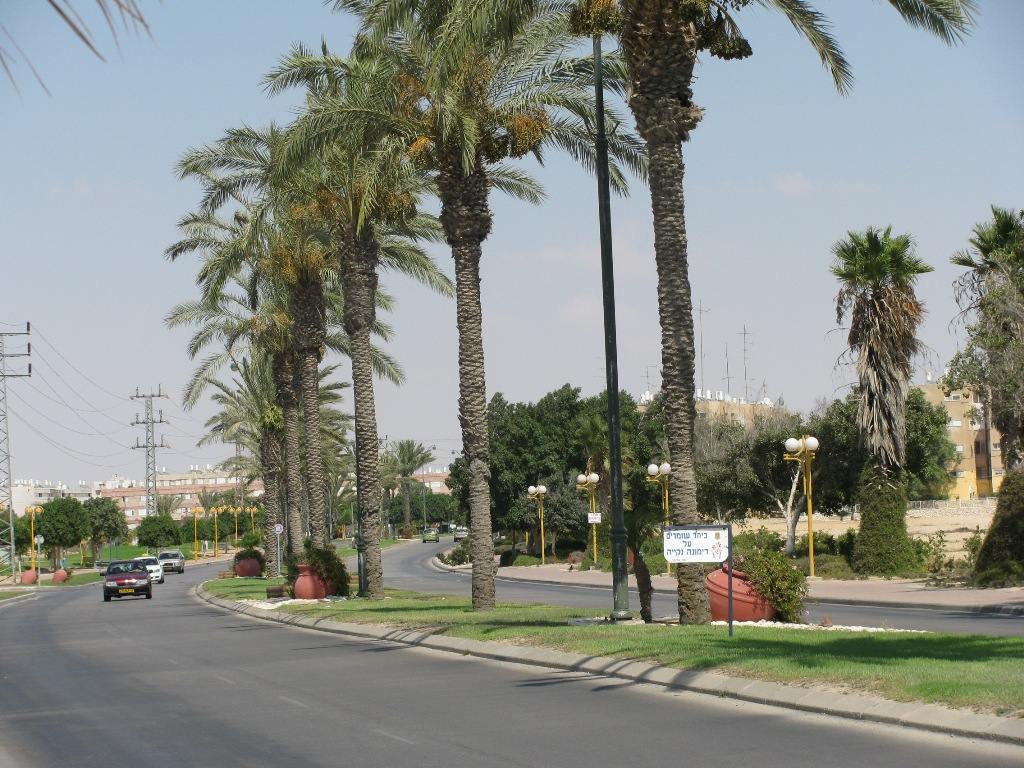
Palm boulevard in Dimona

Dimona was one of the development towns created in the 1950s under the leadership of Israel's first Prime Minister, David Ben-Gurion. Dimona itself was conceived in 1953. The location chosen was close to the Dead Sea Works. It was established in 1955. The first residents were Jewish immigrants from North Africa, with an initial 36 families being the first to settle there. Its population in 1955 was about 300. The North African immigrants also constructed the city's houses. The population was composed mainly of North African, particularly Moroccan immigrants, though immigrants from Yemen and Eastern Europe also arrived, as did Bene Israel immigrants from India.

When the Israeli nuclear program began in 1958, a location not far from the city was chosen for the Negev Nuclear Research Center due to its relative isolation in the desert and availability of housing. In the late 1950s and early 1960s, immigrants from Eastern Europe arrived. A textile factory was opened in 1958. That same year, Dimona became a local council. In 1961, it had a population of 5,000. The emblem of Dimona (as a local council), adopted 2 March 1961, appeared on a stamp issued on 24 March 1965. Dimona was declared a city in 1969. In 1971, it had a population of 23,700.

In spite of a gradual decrease during the 1980s, the city's population began to grow once again in the 1990s when it took in immigrants from the former Soviet Union and Ethiopia. Currently, Dimona is the third largest city in the Negev, with the population of almost 34,000. Due to projected rapid population growth in the Negev, the city is expected to triple in size by 2025.

During the Iran War, on 21 March 2026, Iranian missiles injured 64 people in Dimona.

== Demography ==
Historical population
Year	Pop.	±%
1972	24,300	—
1983	26,800	+10.3%
1995	31,100	+16.0%
2008	32,400	+4.2%
2022	37,213	+14.9%
2024	39,590	+6.4%

Dimona is described as "mini-India" by many for its 7,500-strong Indian Jewish community. It is also home to Israel's Black Hebrew community, formerly governed by its founder and spiritual leader, Ben Ammi Ben-Israel, now deceased. The Black Hebrews number about 3,000 in Dimona, with additional families in Arad, Mitzpe Ramon and the Tiberias area. Their official status in Israel was an ongoing issue for many years, but in May 1990, the issue was resolved with the issuing of first B/1 visas, and a year later, issuing of temporary residency. Status was extended to August 2003, when the Israeli Ministry of Interior granted permanent residency.

== Economy ==
In the early 1980s, textile plants, such as Dimona Textiles Ltd., dominated the industrial landscape. Many plants have since closed. Dimona Silica Industries Ltd. manufactures precipitated silica and calcium carbonate fillers. About a third of the city's population works in industrial workplaces (chemical plants near the Dead Sea like the Dead Sea Works, high-tech companies and textile shops), and another third in the area of services. Due to the introduction of new technologies, many workers have been made redundant in the recent years, creating a total unemployment rate of about 10%. Dimona has taken part of Israel's solar transformation. The Rotem Industrial Complex outside of the city has dozens of solar mirrors that focus the sun's rays on a tower that in turn heats a water boiler to create steam, turning a turbine to create electricity. Luz II, Ltd. plans to use the solar array to test new technology for the three new solar plants to be built in California for Pacific Gas and Electric Company.

== Geography and climate ==
Dimona is located in the Negev Desert. The city stands at an elevation of around 550–600 metres (1,800–1,970 ft) above sea level.

=== Climate ===
Dimona has a semi-arid climate (Köppen climate classification: BSh). The average annual temperature is 18.5 °C (65.3 °F), and around 213 mm (8.39 in) of precipitation falls annually.

Climate data for Dimona
Month	Jan	Feb	Mar	Apr	May	Jun	Jul	Aug	Sep	Oct	Nov	Dec	Year
Mean daily maximum °C (°F)	15.1 (59.2)	16.6 (61.9)	19.7 (67.5)	23.7 (74.7)	28.2 (82.8)	30.9 (87.6)	31.9 (89.4)	32 (90)	30 (86)	27.5 (81.5)	22.3 (72.1)	16.8 (62.2)	24.6 (76.2)
Daily mean °C (°F)	10.4 (50.7)	11.6 (52.9)	14 (57)	17.4 (63.3)	21.1 (70.0)	23.7 (74.7)	25 (77)	25.2 (77.4)	23.5 (74.3)	21 (70)	16.7 (62.1)	12 (54)	18.5 (65.3)
Mean daily minimum °C (°F)	5.8 (42.4)	6.6 (43.9)	8.4 (47.1)	11.1 (52.0)	14.1 (57.4)	16.5 (61.7)	18.2 (64.8)	18.5 (65.3)	17.1 (62.8)	14.6 (58.3)	11.1 (52.0)	7.3 (45.1)	12.4 (54.4)
Average precipitation mm (inches)	47 (1.9)	42 (1.7)	39 (1.5)	11 (0.4)	3 (0.1)	0 (0)	0 (0)	0 (0)	0 (0)	4 (0.2)	24 (0.9)	43 (1.7)	213 (8.4)

== Transportation ==
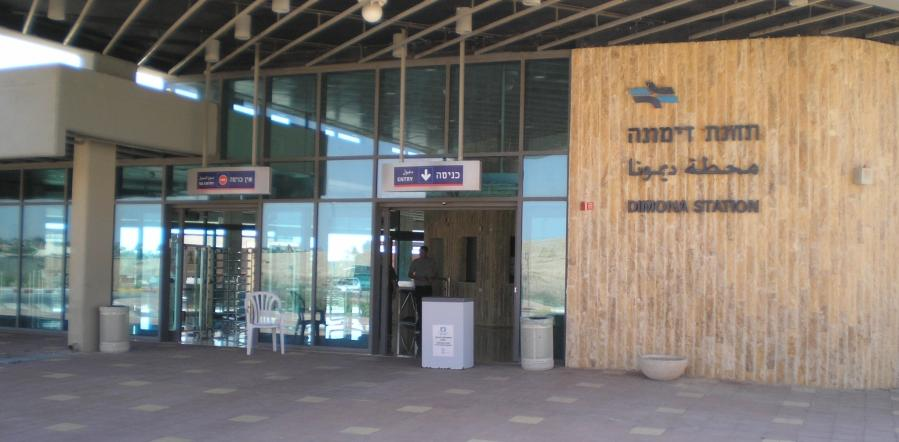
Dimona Railway Station

In the early 1950s, an extension to Dimona and south was constructed from the Railway to Beersheba, designed for freight traffic. A passenger service began in 2005, after pressure from Dimona's municipality. Dimona Railway Station is located in the southwestern part of the city. The main bus terminal is the Dimona Central Bus Station, with lines to Beersheba, Tel Aviv, Eilat, and nearby towns.

== Voting Patterns ==
In the 2022 election, 81 percent of voters in Dimona voted for the parties of the right-wing coalition led by Benjamin Netanyahu, while 17 percent voted for the parties of the center-left coalition led by Yair Lapid and 0.3 percent voted for the Arab parties.

In the 2026 election, 77 percent of voters in Dimona voted for the parties of the right-wing coalition led by Benjamin Netanyahu, while 18 percent voted for the parties of the center-left coalition led by Gadi Eisenkot and 0.7 percent voted for the Arab parties. An additional 2.3 percent voted for the Reservists, and 1.4 percent voted for Amcha Yisrael. Voter turnout increased 14 percent from the 2022 election.

== Notable people ==
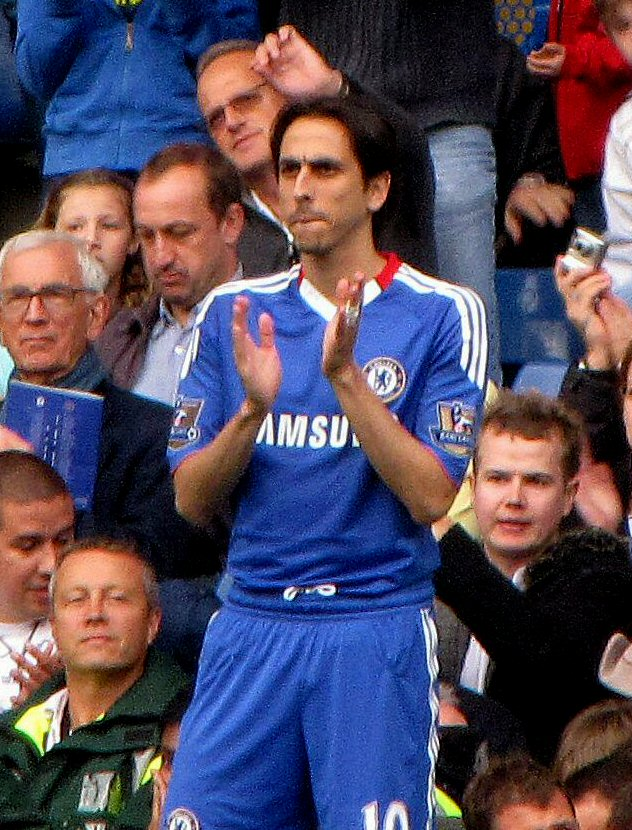
Yossi Benayoun

- Jacques Amir (1933–2011), Knesset member
- Ben Ammi Ben-Israel (1939–2014), spiritual leader of the African Hebrew Israelites of Jerusalem
- Meir Cohen (born 1955), minister of welfare and social services, Knesset member
- Yoel Strick (born 1966), Major General in the IDF reserves
- Kfir Edri (born 1976), footballer
- Yossi Benayoun (born 1980), footballer
- Lucy Aharish (born 1981), news presenter, reporter, television host
- Akiva Turgeman (born 1991), singer and songwriter
- Rabbi Yosef ben David Renassia (1879–1962), Algerian rabbi and historic preservationist

== Twin towns ==
Dimona is twinned with:

- Andernach, Rhineland-Palatinate, Germany (1975)
