= Eugene Schieffelin =

American amateur ornithologist

- Born: January 29, 1827; New York City, U.S.
- Died: August 15, 1906 (aged 79); Newport, Rhode Island, U.S.
- Spouse: Catherine Tonnelé Hall
- Relatives: Henry Maunsell Schieffelin (brother); Samuel Schieffelin (brother); Bradhurst Schieffelin (brother)

Eugene Schieffelin (January 29, 1827 – August 15, 1906) was an American amateur ornithologist who belonged to the New York Genealogical and Biographical Society and the New York Zoological Society. In 1877, he became chairman of the American Acclimatization Society and joined their efforts to introduce non-native species to North America for economic and cultural reasons. His 1890 release of European starlings in Central Park resulted in the first successful starling nesting in North America to be observed by naturalists.

In the decades after his death, Schiefflin was recast as being solely responsible for the introduction of starlings, and in 1948, Edwin Way Teale claimed (without evidence) that he had been motivated by a desire to introduce all of Shakespeare's birds to North America.

== Early life ==
Schieffelin was born in New York City on January 29, 1827. He was the seventh son of Henry Hamilton Schieffelin (1783–1865) and Maria Theresa (née Bradhurst) Schieffelin (1786–1872). His father, a prominent lawyer, was named in honor of Governor Henry Hamilton for whom his grandfather Jacob Schieffelin served as secretary for during the American Revolutionary War. Among his siblings was author Samuel Schieffelin, and Bradhurst Schieffelin, a supporter of the People's Party. The Schieffelin family was one of the oldest families in Manhattan.

== Starling release ==
Schieffelin belonged to the American Acclimatization Society, a group that aimed to help exchange plants and animals from one part of the world to another. In the 19th century, such acclimatization societies were fashionable and supported by the scientific knowledge and beliefs of that era, as the effect that non-native species could have on the local ecosystem was not yet known.

In 1890, Schieffelin released 60 imported starlings from England into New York City's Central Park. He did the same with another 40 birds in 1891. According to an oft-repeated story, Schieffelin supposedly introduced starlings as part of a project to bring to the United States all the birds mentioned in the works of William Shakespeare. Some historians have cast doubt on this story, as no record of it exists until the 1940s. He may have also been trying to control the same pests that had been annoying him thirty years earlier, when he sponsored the introduction of the house sparrow to North America.

Schieffelin's efforts were part of multiple releases of starlings in the United States, ranging from the mid-1870s through the mid-1890s. The successful spread of starlings has come at the expense of many native birds that compete with the starling for nest holes in trees. The starlings have also had negative impact on the US economy and ecosystem. European starlings are now considered an invasive species in the United States.

His attempts to introduce bullfinches, chaffinches, nightingales, and skylarks were not successful.

== Personal life ==
Schieffelin was married to Catherine Tonnelé Hall (d. 1910). Catherine was a daughter of Valentine Gill Hall, an Irish immigrant, and Susan (née Tonnelé) Hall and the sister of Valentine Hall Jr., a banker and merchant who was the grandfather of Eleanor Roosevelt. Catherine's uncle was John Tonnelé Jr., the farmer and politician who was a member of the New Jersey State Legislature.

Schieffelin died at the Hartshorn villa in Newport, Rhode Island on August 15, 1906.
