= Bradhurst =

Surname list

Bradhurst is a given and surname most prevalent in the United States. Notable people with the name include:

- Bradhurst Schieffelin (1824–1909), druggist and activist
- Maunsell Bradhurst Field (1822–1875), judge and lawyer
- Samuel Bradhurst Schieffelin (1811–1900), businessman and author

== See also ==
- Brandhorst (disambiguation)
