= Henry Schieffelin =

Henry Schieffelin may refer to:

- Henry Maunsell Schieffelin (1808–1890), American businessman, philanthropist and consul general in Liberia
- Henry Hamilton Schieffelin (1783–1865), American businessman and lawyer
