= American Acclimatization Society =

Organization, introduced invasive species to North America

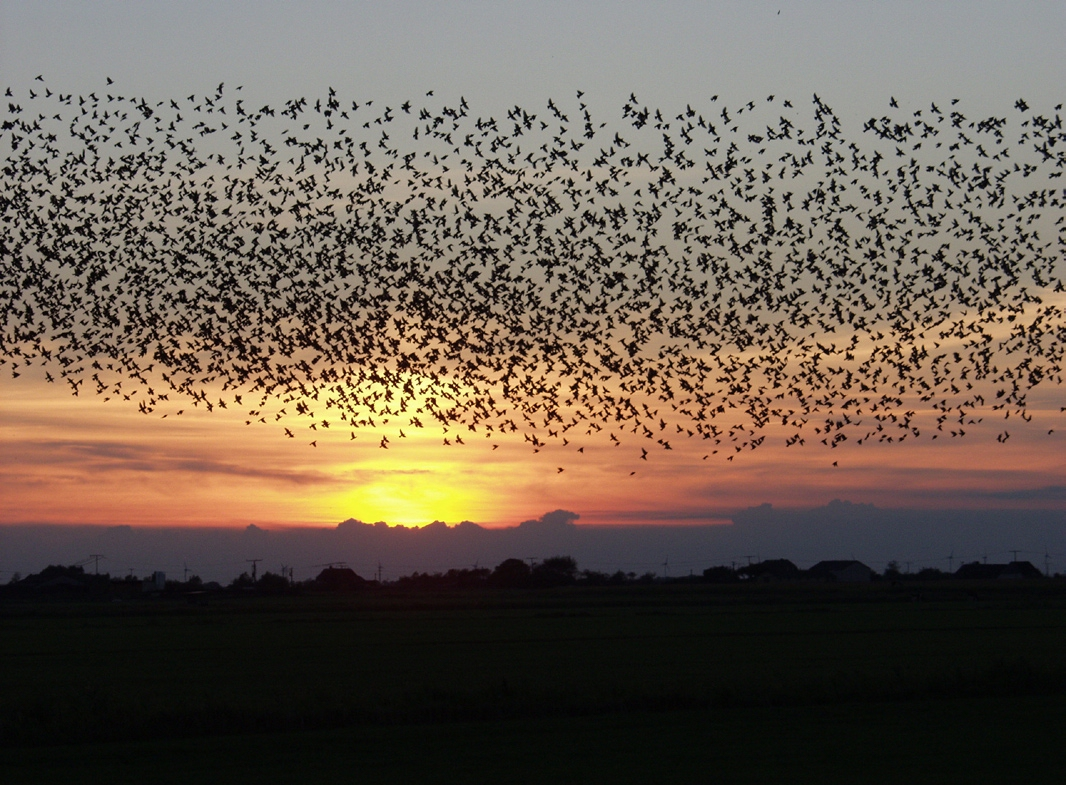
A flock of starlings in Denmark. Flocks of this size and larger are common in North America following the successful introduction of the species in the 19th century.

The American Acclimatization Society was a group founded in New York City in 1871 dedicated to introducing European flora and fauna into North America for both economic and cultural reasons. The group's charter explained its goal was to introduce "such foreign varieties of the animal and vegetable kingdom as may be useful or interesting." Like other acclimatisation societies, the American Acclimatization Society's efforts impacted the natural history of North America, particularly due to its success in introducing invasive bird species.

== Background ==
In 1854, the Société zoologique d'acclimatation was founded in Paris by French naturalist Isidore Geoffroy Saint-Hilaire, whose 1849 treatise Acclimatation et domestication des animaux utiles ("Acclimatization and Domestication of Useful Animals") had urged the French government to introduce, and when necessary, selectively breed foreign animals both to provide meat and to control pests. The group inspired the formation of similar groups around the world, particularly in countries that had been colonized by Europeans. Wildlife scientist John Marzluff writes that the motives of the 19th-century acclimatization enthusiasts were largely cultural: "Western European settlers introduced many species throughout the world because they wanted birds from their homelands in their new environs."

== Founding ==
Even before the American society's founding, wealthy New York residents and naturalists had deliberately sought to introduce foreign animals. In 1864 the commissioners of Central Park had introduced Java sparrows, house sparrows, chaffinches and blackbirds into the park. The European sparrows were reported to have "multiplied amazingly". They quickly became one of the most common birds in New York, though the others did not seem to do as well. After the society's founding, such efforts were redoubled. The group's annual meeting held at the Great New York Aquarium in 1877 reported that the release of 50 pairs of English skylarks into Central Park had only been a partial success, since most had flown across the East River to take up residence at Newtown and Canarsie in Brooklyn. At the meeting, the recent release of European starlings, Japanese finches and pheasants into the park were noted. The meeting adjourned with the group resolved to introduce more chaffinches, skylarks, European robins and tits—"birds which were useful to the farmer and contributed to the beauty of the groves and fields"—in the city.

== Notable members ==
By 1877, New York pharmacist Eugene Schieffelin was the chairman of the society. Another notable member of the society was wealthy silk merchant Alfred Edwards, who constructed bird boxes around Manhattan to help house sparrows to breed.

Some accounts of Schieffelin's efforts claim that he had resolved that, as an aesthetic goal, the organization should introduce every bird species mentioned in the works of William Shakespeare. However, multiple historians have disputed this claim, as no contemporary source corroborates this claim of a link to Shakespeare. The American poet William Cullen Bryant admired Schieffelin's efforts and wrote his poem The Olde-World Sparrow ("A winged settler has taken his place/With Teutons and Men of the Celtic race") after spending an evening with Schieffelin, who had just released a shipment of sparrows into his yard. Schieffelin himself is seen by modern biologists as "an eccentric at best, a lunatic at worst."

== Impact and the starlings ==
Starlings had been introduced in the United States by the mid-1870s. The American Acclimatization Society added another 100 starlings to the total in 1890 and 1891. By the early 21st century, more than 200 million European starlings had spread throughout the United States, Mexico and Canada. Their aggressive competition for nesting cavities has long been thought to be responsible for the collapse of some native bird populations, among them New York's state bird, the eastern bluebird, though some research has found that this is unlikely, except in the case of sapsuckers. For its role in the decline of local native species and the damages to agriculture, the European starling has been included in the IUCN List of the world's 100 worst invasive species.

Largely because of the spread of the European starling, a 2007 article in the San Francisco Chronicle (deriding the introduction of fallow deer to the Point Reyes National Seashore) called the society "the canonic cautionary tale of biological pollution."

== See also ==
- Conservation in the United States
- Introduced species
