= Brandhorst (disambiguation) =

Brandhorst is a German village.

Brandhorst may also refer to:

- Museum Brandhorst, a museum in Munich, Germany
- Andreas Brandhorst (born 1956), German translator
- David Brandhorst (1998–2001), child killed in the September 11 attacks

== See also ==
- Bradhurst
