= Hannah Lawrence Schieffelin =

American political poet (1758–1838)

- Born: July 8, 1758; New York City, Province of New York, U.S.
- Died: October 3, 1838 (aged 80); New York City, U.S.
- Spouse: Jacob Schieffelin
- Parent(s): John Lawrence; Anna Burling.

Hannah Lawrence Schieffelin (July 8, 1758 – October 3, 1838) was an American political poet in Revolutionary America and during the early United States.

== Early life ==
Hannah Lawrence was a daughter of John Lawrence and Anna Burling.

Hannah Lawrence came from a Quaker family, who had arrived in the New World in the 17th century and had settled on Long Island.

Hannah's father, John Lawrence (1732–1794), was a successful merchant, whose ancestors held royal patents to Flushing and to Lawrence, Long Island. John Lawrence's great-grandfather was William Lawrence from St Albans, northwest of London. William Lawrence, at the age of twelve, sailed with his mother and siblings from London to Massachusetts, in 1635. Later, he received the rights to 900 acres of land in Vlissingen, New Amsterdam, corresponding to today's College Point and Flushing on Long Island. William Lawrence was a landowner, councilman, sheriff and judge in Queens County, NY.

Hannah's mother was Anna Burling (1735–1821). The Burling family came from Barking, today an eastern suburb of London. The Burlings were Quakers. They were persecuted in England and emigrated to America to escape.

== Personal life ==
Hannah Lawrence married Jacob Schieffelin (1757–1835), on August 13, 1780. The couple married secretly in Manhattan, six weeks after they met. A few day later, Hannah was expelled from the Quaker Association because her wedding plans had not been approved. At the time of their wedding, Jacob Schieffelin was still a British officer, while the Quakers were mostly anti-British.

The couple had nine children, seven of whom reached adulthood: Edward Lawrence, Henry Hamilton, Effingham, Anna Maria, Effingham Lawrence, Jacob, John Lawrence, Cornelia, Richard Lawrence.

== Works ==
=== Notebook of Poems (Manuscript of Poems by Matilda, Hannah's pseudonym, 1774–1794) ===
- Address'd to a canary bird (1774/75)
- Elegy on an unfortunate Veteran (1775)
- To Eliza (From Cedar Grove, 1776), published in the Columbian Magazine
- To Amynta (1776)
- To Myrtilla (1776)
- To Delia (1776)
- To Eliza (Cedar Grove, by Matilda, 1776/77)
- To Horatio (1776/77)
- On General Lee. Written during his captivity (1777/78)
- Military Fame (1777/78)
- On hearing the brave unfortunate Paschal Paoli ...
- An address in the favour of a singing Bird
- Epistle to Julia. Miss E. M. at the Hermitage (Note: E.M. means Elizabeth "Betsy" Mitchell)
- To Nisus. The worthy R. L. (Note: R.L. means Richard Lawrence)
- To the Lark (In answer to his reply)
- Elegy
- To Lavinia (Note: Lavinia means Mrs Hoffman, maiden Miss Murray)
- On reading some Poems by the African Poetess
- Ode to Melvyn
- The Triumph of Reason. Inscribed to Leandra.
- On the purpose to which the avenue adjoining Trinity Church has of late been dedicated, 1779. "This is the scene of gay resort, Here vice and folly hold their court, Here all the martial band parade, To vanquish – some unguarded Maid. Here ambles many a dauntless Chief. Who can, O great beyond belief? Who can, as sage historians say, Defeat – whole Bottles in array. …"
- The Recantation
- To Matilda. By Melvyn
- The Interposition
- Epistle to Amelia. Bellevue. 1779 (Note: At Flushing, Long Island)
- To Mira
- Ode to Melancholy
- To Livinia. At Bellevue.
- Ode on entering my one and twentieth year.
- Ode to Aurora
- New York April 1780. "On the King's birthday 1780 ..." Note: Mentions Sir Henry Clinton, General during the American War of Independence
- Epistle on an American, residing in England
- Imitation of the French of the Marquis de la Fare. July. 1780.
- A Journal During a Lady's Courtship (Diary, 1780)
- The Wedding Day. Written on Sunday morning, the 13th of August 1780
- On leaving New York. 15 September 1780
- Ode to the Sun. On absence. Niagara. 1781.
- Absence. An Elegy.
- Stanzas occasioned by a Gentleman of wit and humour ...
- The Progress of Liberty. Inscribed to General Washington. New York 1785)
- Elegiac Reflections. Note: Written 1779. Published in the Columbian Magazine 1787.
- On Sensibility
- Montreal. A Sunset. On a view of the Mountain
- On Life. So, teach us to number our days, ... Psalm 90.12. ... Montreal 1789.
- Memory an Elegy. "Thy waves, St Lawrence, that impetuous roll ..." Montreal 1788
- The Traveller returned. New York May 18, 1795
- To a Friend returned from a distant Country. New York Sept. 10. 1794.
- Elegy. Addressed to the River St Lawrence. August 5, 1794

=== Poems, undated; fragments; poems by others; fragment of dress worn by her at Court Ball in Quebec (1780) ===
- Ambition and love. An allegorical tale
- To Delia
- Elegy on a blind Horse, turned out to provide for himself
- Elegy on Memory
- Epistle - Armida to Renaldo ... Subject from Tasso's Jerusalem delivered
- A Eulogy on the merits of the indefatigable lustical Orator
- The forsaken Bower. To Miss B ... (by Matilda, Rocon Hall, Bloomingdale) (Note: The Schieffelins’ summer house Rooka Hall in Manhattanville was adjoining Dr. Samuel Bradhurst's mansion and Alexander Hamilton's Grange)
- The Lark. Translated from the German. Note: Another handwriting
- Lines written on a blank leaf of Phocion's* Letters (*By the late General A. Hamilton. Written by Cornelia). "Thus he, whose fearless youth was spent in arms, In doubtful conflicts, and in wars alarms. The purpose gained for which he bravely fought, excells in strength of reasoning, depth of thought ..." Note: Cornelia was one of Hannah's pseudonym. Compare to "Letter from Phocion" by Alexander Hamilton.
- Military Fame. A Sonnet.
- Hymn to the Deity, written during a Storm
- To Julia

=== Narrative of Events and Observations That Occurred during a Journey through Canada in the Years 1780–81 ===
- Stanzas on leaving New York (September 15, 1780)
- The Shade of Montgomery (Quebec, October, 1780)

=== Poems (1790–1818) ===
- Written on a Bust of Washington (August 24, 1785)
- George Washington - Born the 22nd February 1732 (Poem, New York, August 24, 1797)
- Autumn. An Elegiac Ode. (Bloomingdale, November 1799). Note: Bloomingdale Road was a former name of part of Broadway (Manhattan)
- On the Death of George Washington (December 1799, Mining Record Press, 61 Broadway, N.Y.)
- Elegy on the death of Miss Eliza Bradhurst (October 16, 1802)
- Sacred to the memory of General Alexander Hamilton, who departed this transitory life July 12, 1804
- To a Friend returned after a long absence (New York, May 1805)
- The Drama: Moral & Patriotic (1816)

=== Notebook of Poems (kept at New York City and at Newtown, Long Island) ===
- A Vindication - To Edward Rushton (Comment on Edward Rushton's letter to George Washington, New York, May 27, 1797)
- The slave (Time and Literary Piece Companion, New York, May 30, 1797)
- On the Necessity of the Gradual Abolition of Slavery (Time and Literary Piece Companion, New York, June 5, 1797)
- A tribute to the memory of Richard Lawrence who died of the prevailing epidemic (Newtown, October, 1798)
- Reflections on the death of General George Washington (New York, December, 1799)
