= Church of St. Luke in the Fields =

Episcopal church in Manhattan, New York

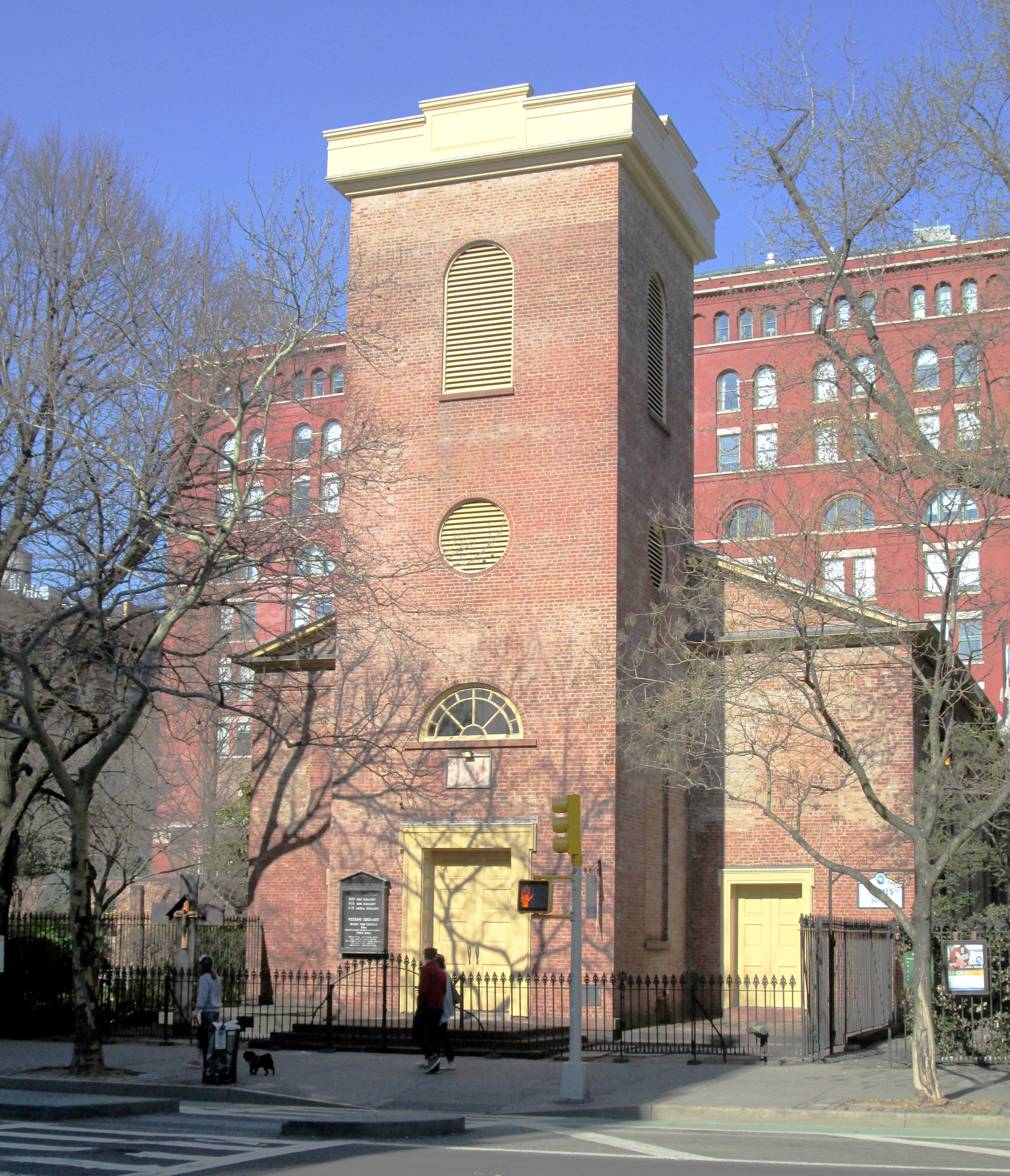
- The church in 2015
- Church of St. Luke in the Fields
- 40.7324°N 74.007°W
- Address: 487 Hudson Street; Manhattan, New York City
- Country: United States
- Denomination: Episcopal
- Website: stlukeinthefields.org

Clergy
- Rector: Rev. Caroline Stacey

The Church of St. Luke in the Fields is an Episcopal church at 487 Hudson Street, between Christopher and Barrow Streets, in the West Village neighborhood of Manhattan, New York City. The church was constructed in 1821–1822 and has been attributed to both John Heath, the building contractor, and James N. Wells.

The church reported 894 members in 2017 and 885 members in 2025. Plate and pledge income reported for the congregation in 2025 was $0.00 with average Sunday attendance (ASA) of zero persons.

The church is affiliated with the St. Luke's School, an elementary school located on the same block. Both are located within the Greenwich Village Historic District, designated in 1969.

== History ==
The church was founded in 1820 on farmland donated by Trinity Church, to accommodate the expansion of New York City northward into Greenwich Village. The original church building was reminiscent of an English village church, with a square tower at one end, but made of brick and built in the Federal style. It was part of a complex laid out by Clement Clarke Moore – who would serve as the church's first pastor – which included adjoining stone row houses, which the church rented out. Greenwich Village at the time was a sanctuary for people fleeing the endemic diseases of the city proper, and the name of the new parish – St. Luke in the Fields – was chosen to evoke the pastoral quality of the area.

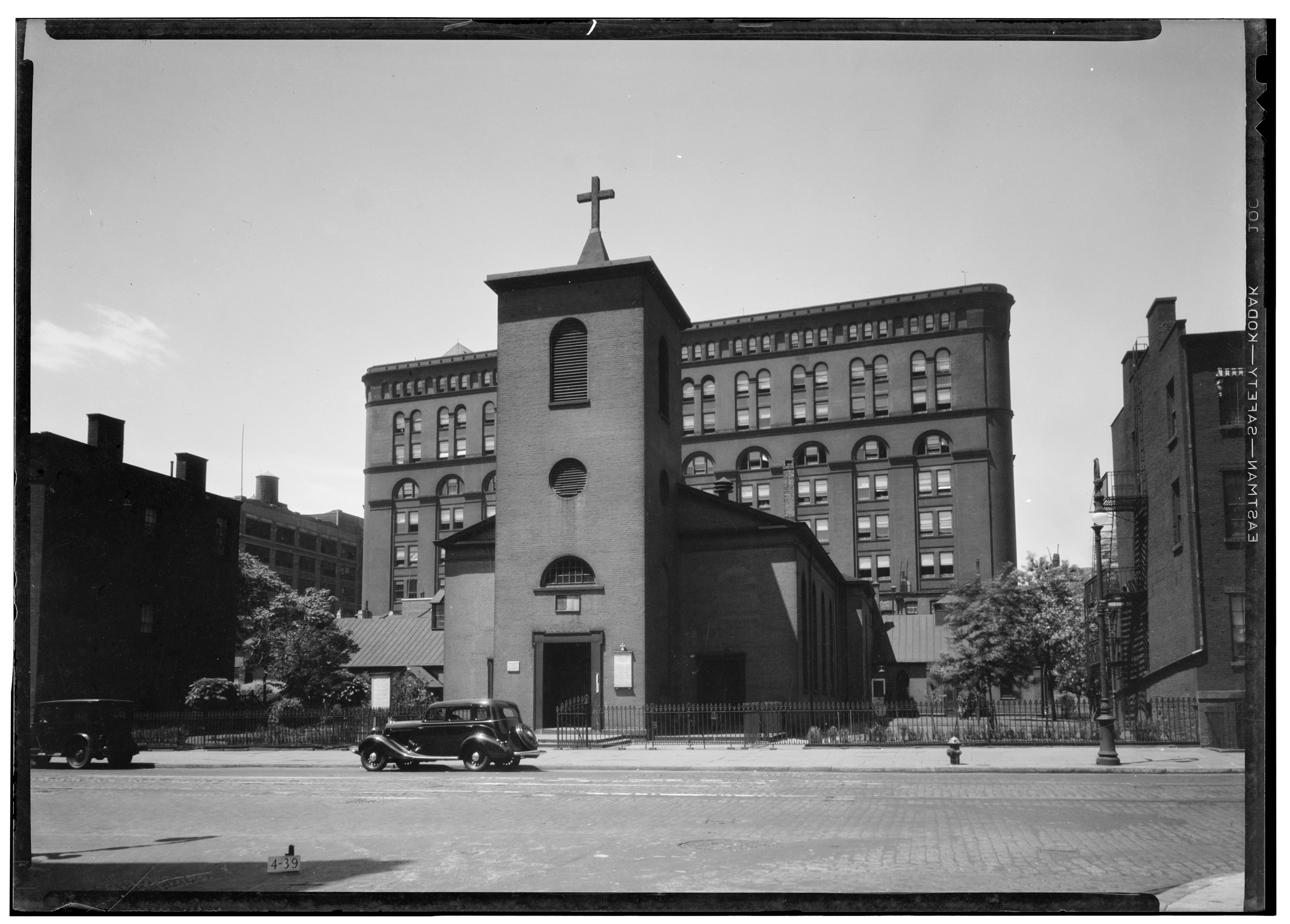
Historic American Buildings Survey photo of the Chapel of St. Luke in the Fields (1934)

When the surrounding neighborhood became predominantly poor and largely composed of immigrants in the late 1880s, the congregation moved north to a site adjoining Hamilton Grange at West 141st Street, and St. Luke's became a chapel of Trinity Church, only regaining its independence in 1976 under rector Ledlie Laughlin.

Other prominent rectors in the past have included John Murray Forbes, who helped to bring the Oxford Movement to the United States and Edward Schlueter, who served from 1911 until the 1940s, and developed programs which served the community, such as children's summer camps. Schlueter also had the church sanctuary redesigned in high Medieval style.

The church building was damaged by fire twice, in 1886 and on March 6, 1981. After the latter fire, which gutted the building, it was reconstructed by Hugh Hardy of Hardy Holzman Pfeiffer Associates, who restored many of its original Federal-style touches. The reconstruction was completed in 1985.

In 2000, the garden of the church received a Village Award from the Greenwich Village Society for Historic Preservation.

== Activism ==
For many years, the church distributed bread to the poor after the 10am service on Saturdays. This "Leake Dole of Bread" was provided for in the will of John Leake.

Starting in the 1980s, the HIV/AIDS epidemic deeply affected the Village community, hitting the congregation hard. The AIDS Project of St. Luke's was founded in 1987, providing Saturday dinner and weekend teas to tens of thousands of afflicted persons. One of the priests ministering to AIDS patients then was former actress Molly McGreevy. St. Luke's is actively involved with the gay and lesbian community, participating with its own contingent at the annual Gay Pride March. Every year, the church also holds a Festive Choral Evensong after the Pride March.

Gay civil rights hero Dick Leitsch is interred within the church.

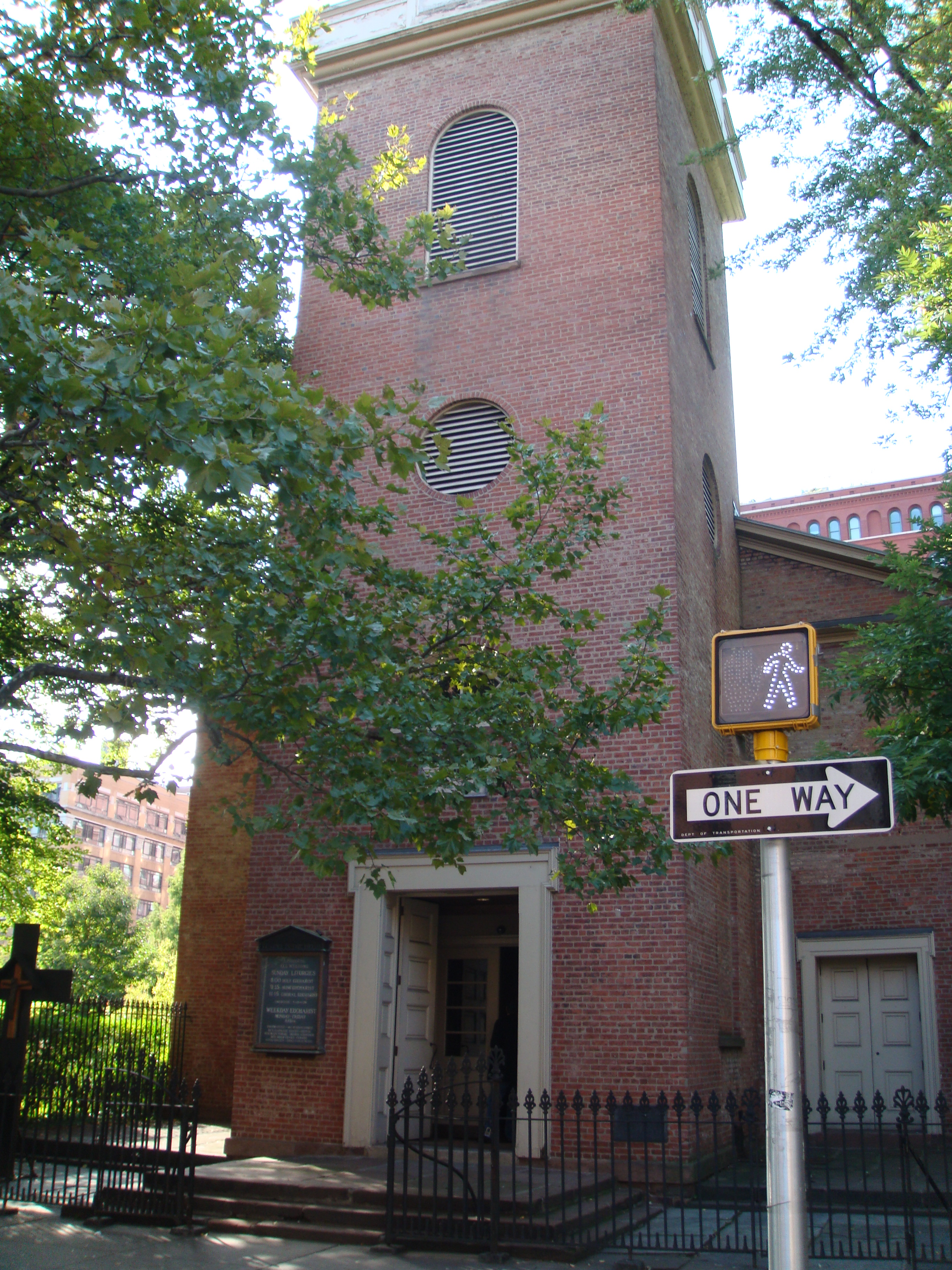
A close-up of the tower

== Music ==
The choir of the church performs several concerts yearly, with a series of three concerts each spring season. In the past these concerts have included performances such as the New York premiere of Telemann's St. Matthew Passion, the Tenebrae settings of composer Richard Toensing, and many other works. The choir has made several recordings. In addition to the choir, the church is known for its vigorous congregational singing. David Shuler is the organist and choirmaster of the church.

Gwen Gould, former music director of the School at St. Luke's, was also the founder of the West Village Chorale, currently directed by Colin Britt. Until 2010, most of the Chorale's concerts were performed at the Church. They then moved to Judson Memorial Church at Washington Square Park.

The Orchestra of St. Luke's draws its name from the church.

=== Organ ===
The current organ at the church was installed in 1986 after the 1981 fire destroyed the previous organ. It is almost identical to the one that was destroyed, which had been installed in 1979, less than two years before the fire. Its keys are mechanical, though the stops operate electrically. It has 27 stops and 1,670 pipes.

== In popular culture ==
- The church was used as a location for the 2008 film Doubt.
