= Hamilton Grange National Memorial =

Historic house in Manhattan, New York

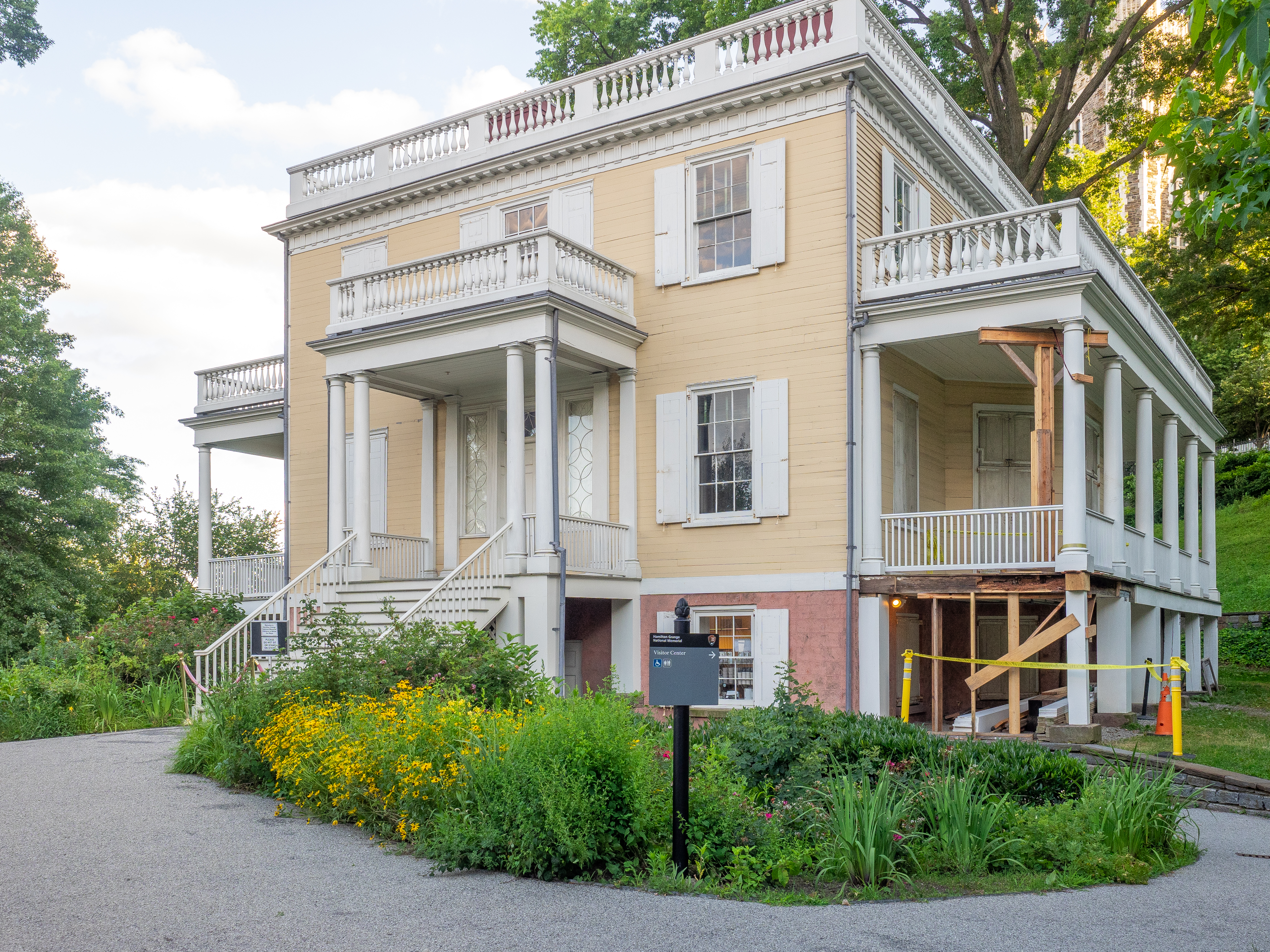
- The entrance to Hamilton Grange

- Location within New York City Location within New York Location within the United States
- Location: West 141st Street and Hamilton Terrace, Manhattan, New York, U.S.
- Coordinates: 40°49′17″N 73°56′50″W
- Area: 1.04 acres (0.42 ha)
- Established: May 1962
- Visitors: 63,647 (in 2024)
- Governing body: National Park Service
- Website: Hamilton Grange National Memorial
- Hamilton Grange National Memorial
- U.S. National Register of Historic Places
- U.S. National Historic Landmark
- U.S. National Memorial
- New York State Register of Historic Places
- New York City Landmark
- Architect: John McComb Jr.
- Architectural style: Federal style
- Website: Hamilton Grange National Memorial
- NRHP reference No.: 66000097
- NYSRHP No.: 06101.000083
- NYCL No.: 0317A

Significant dates
- Added to NRHP: October 15, 1966
- Designated NHL: December 19, 1960
- Designated NYSRHP: June 23, 1980
- Designated NYCL: August 2, 1967

Hamilton Grange National Memorial (also known as Hamilton Grange or the Grange) is a historic house museum within St. Nicholas Park in the Hamilton Heights neighborhood of Manhattan in New York City, United States. Operated by the National Park Service (NPS), the structure was the only home ever owned by Alexander Hamilton, a U.S. founding father. The house contains exhibits for visitors, as well as various rooms with restored 19th-century interiors. Originally located near present-day 143rd Street, the house was moved in 1889 to 287 Convent Avenue before being relocated again in 2008 to St. Nicholas Park. The structure is a New York City designated landmark and a United States national memorial, and it is listed on the National Register of Historic Places.

Hamilton acquired land for the estate from Jacob Schieffelin and Samuel Bradhurst starting in 1800, and he commissioned architect John McComb Jr. to design a country home there. The house was completed in 1802, just two years before Hamilton's death in 1804. The house remained in his family for 30 years afterward and was then sold several times, including to the Ward family, who occupied the house between 1845 and 1876. The original estate was parceled off and sold in the 1880s, and the house was first relocated after St. Luke's Episcopal Church bought it in 1889. The church used Hamilton Grange as a chapel and a rectory before selling it to the American Scenic and Historic Preservation Society (ASHPS) in 1924. The ASHPS opened the house as a museum in 1930 and handed over operations to the NPS in 1960. For the next four decades, the NPS attempted to move the house so the building could be restored. The Grange was closed for restoration and relocation between 2006 and 2011.

The Grange is a two-story frame Federal-style house with a ground level basement. It is a rectangular structure with porticos on the front and rear facades, as well as piazzas to its left and right. The basement dates from 2011 and contains the gift shop and exhibits, while the other two stories are part of the original house. On the first floor are Hamilton's study, a parlor, a dining room, and two additional spaces. The second-floor spaces were used as bedrooms. Most of Hamilton's original belongings were sold after his death to other American institutions, and many of the current objects in the house are replicas created in 2011. The Grange has been the subject of architectural commentary over the years, and it is the namesake of several structures in the neighborhood.

== Site ==
The house is located in the Hamilton Heights and Sugar Hill sections of the neighborhood of Harlem in Manhattan, New York City. It has occupied three sites in the neighborhood throughout its history, all within the bounds of the U.S. founding father Alexander Hamilton's original estate. The estate was part of section IX of what was known as Jochem Pieter's Hills. John Delavall bought lot IX in 1691 and sold the southern half of the lot to Samuel Kelly (or Kelley), who then sold that site to druggist Jacob Schieffelin in 1799. Schieffelin's parcel was bounded by the Hudson River to the west, 140th Street to the south, St. Nicholas Avenue to the east, and 145th Street to the north. The Bloomingdale Road bisected Schieffelin's parcel into western and eastern plots; Hamilton's estate, the Grange, occupied the eastern plot. (Note: The New York Sun wrote that the estate's western limit was originally the Hudson River, but Mongin & Whidden 1980 stated that the estate was always landlocked.) The Grange name extended across much of the surrounding area, which remained largely rural until the late 19th century.

The first site was near present-day 143rd Street, at the center of Hamilton's estate. It occupied a small plateau that existed on the estate. This site stood approximately 60 feet (18 m) or 75 feet (23 m) west of modern-day Convent Avenue. There were also some outbuildings to the east, between what is now Hamilton Terrace and Convent Avenue. These included a barn, chicken house, and shed, as well as a "spring house" atop one of two now-infilled streams on the site, where butter and milk were stored. The house's original site is occupied by the Roman Catholic Church of Our Lady of Lourdes, which was built starting in 1902 and is itself a New York City designated landmark.

The second site was at 287 Convent Avenue, approximately 250 feet (76 m) or 350 feet (110 m) south of the original location. The house occupied this location from 1889 to 2008. It was located on the east side of the avenue and sloped down significantly to the east, toward Hamilton Terrace. East of the house was a 5,400-square-foot (500 m^{2}) lawn owned by St. Luke's Episcopal Church. After the house was moved in 2008, children planted a flower garden at 287 Convent Avenue.

The third and current site is at 414 West 141st Street, at the southern end of Hamilton Terrace. The house is within St. Nicholas Park, 500 feet (150 m) south of the second site. The current site abuts the campus of City College of New York (CCNY), a unit of the City University of New York. The parcel covers nearly 1 acre (4,000 m^{2}) and consists of a plateau measuring no more than 50 to 60 feet (15 to 18 m) wide.

== Use as residence ==
Alexander Hamilton was born sometime between 1755 and 1757 (Note: It is unclear whether Hamilton was born in 1755 or 1757; see also Alexander Hamilton § Notes.) on Nevis and went to study at King's College, now part of Columbia University, in New York City at the age of 16. During his career, Hamilton was a military officer, lawyer, and author of some of The Federalist Papers. He also married Elizabeth Schuyler in 1780, just after the American Revolutionary War, and served as the first United States Secretary of the Treasury in 1789. After Hamilton retired as Treasury Secretary in 1795, his family occupied various houses in Manhattan; by 1798, they were renting a country house in Harlem from their brother-in-law John Barker Church. Until then, Alexander Hamilton had never owned a house.

In late 1798, Hamilton wrote to his wife Eliza that he was planning a project in New York City, the details of which he was keeping secret. During the Quasi-War of 1798–1800, Hamilton served as Inspector General of the United States Army, trying to fend off a war against France; as such, he could not devote time to his "project". He wrote a letter to the merchant Ebenezer Stevens in October 1799, offering to buy a parcel adjoining Stevens's land from Jacob Schieffelin. Hamilton had wanted the plot west of the Bloomingdale Road, but Schieffelin would only sell the plot to the east of the road. Hamilton bought the eastern site on August 2, 1800, paying $4,000 for a plot of 15 acres (6.1 ha). That September, he bought 3 acres (1.2 ha) to the north of his existing parcel from Samuel Bradhurst. Hamilton also acquired the rights to fish in the nearby rivers and hunt game in the woodlands of Upper Manhattan. He and his wife's family, the Schuyler family, had been developing plans for a permanent house for nearly two years at that point.

=== Development ===
After officially acquiring the Schieffelin site, Alexander, Eliza, and their seven children moved into an existing farmhouse on the site. Alexander hired architect John McComb Jr. to remodel that house for an estimated $70.90 (equivalent to $1,345 in 2025). (Note: 1634–1699: McCusker, J. J. (1997). How Much Is That in Real Money? A Historical Price Index for Use as a Deflator of Money Values in the Economy of the United States: Addenda et Corrigenda (PDF). American Antiquarian Society. 1700–1799: McCusker, J. J. (1992). How Much Is That in Real Money? A Historical Price Index for Use as a Deflator of Money Values in the Economy of the United States (PDF). American Antiquarian Society. 1800–present: Federal Reserve Bank of Minneapolis. "Consumer Price Index (estimate) 1800–".) (Note: The renovation cost was recorded in pound sterling as "28 pounds, 7 shillings, 2 pence". Mongin & Whidden 1980, p. 16 calculated that this amount in pound sterling was about $70.90.) McComb had, at the time, just designed Gracie Mansion and was in a competition to design New York City Hall. Hamilton also commissioned McComb to design a country home on the estate. Eliza's father Philip Schuyler tried and failed to hire a contractor from Albany, New York, delaying the construction of the permanent house by a year. Ultimately, Ezra Weeks was hired to build the house; Hamilton had defended Weeks's brother in a murder trial two years earlier.

Weeks and McComb drew up a proposal for the house, dated June 22, 1801, in which they divided the work between them. Weeks probably began excavating the foundation in late 1801, and he first billed Hamilton in December of that year. After Weeks excavated the site and built the foundation and frame, McComb probably commenced his portion of the work in May or June 1802. Timber in the mansion was sourced from the grounds of the General Schuyler House in Saratoga, New York. The house was mostly done by mid-1802, although some work such as painting continued through February 1803. Hamilton wrote a letter to Eliza in late 1803, requesting alterations to an ice house on the site. In total, the house and surrounding structures cost $17,972.06 (equivalent to $404,371 in 2025), excluding lumber that Philip Schuyler gave to Alexander as a gift. Hamilton's friends estimated that the house cost as much as $25,000.

=== Hamilton occupancy ===
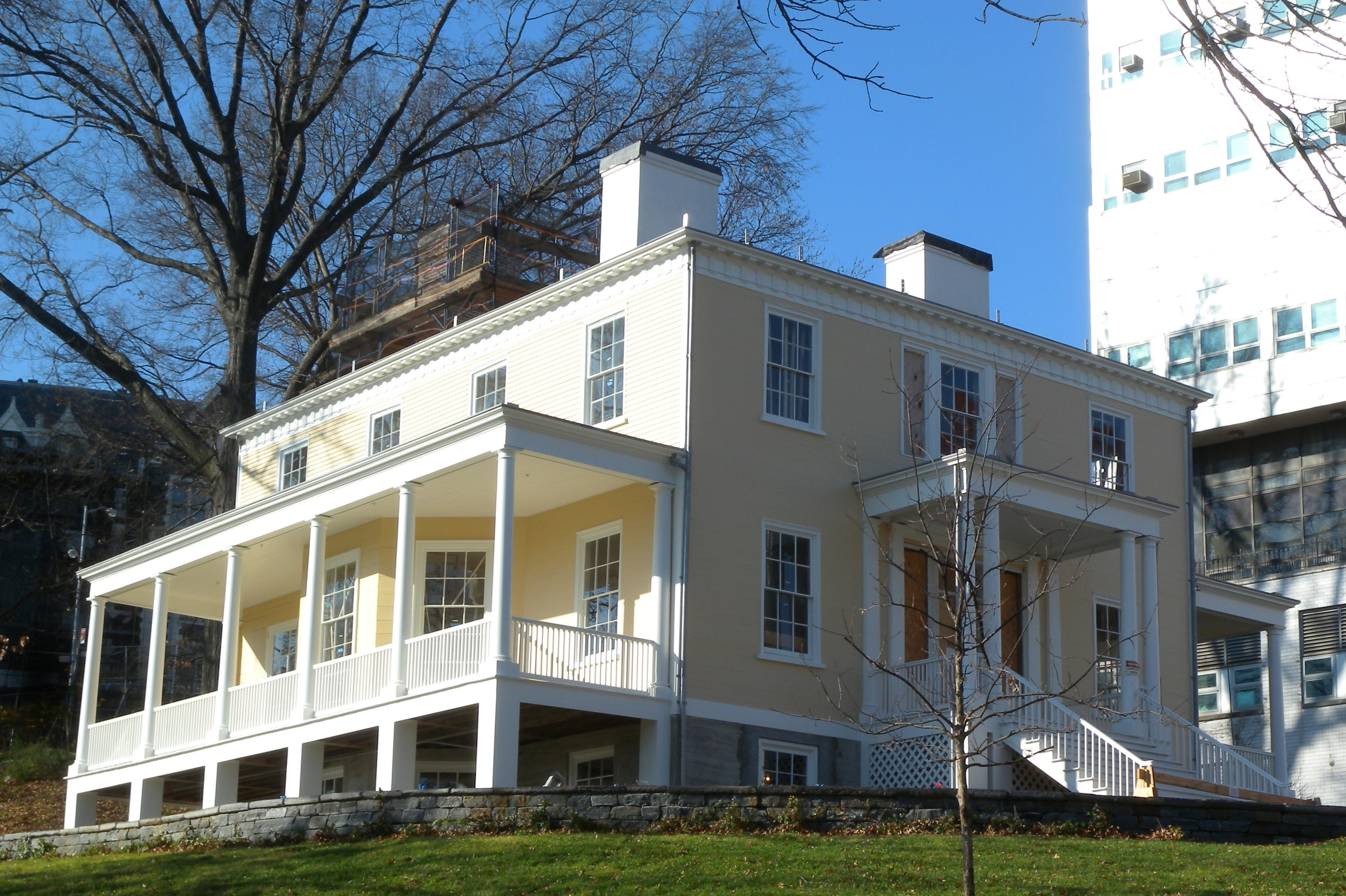
The Hamilton family moved into the house in August 1802.

The Hamilton family moved into the house in August 1802. Known as the Grange, the estate was named after the estate of Hamilton's grandfather in Scotland. (Note: Hamilton's grandfather's estate was located in Stevenston, Ayrshire. An early source attributed the name to Marquis de Lafayette's estate in France, Château de la Grange-Bléneau.) Hamilton acquired another parcel from Bradhurst in January 1803, bringing his total acquisition to 32 acres (13 ha). (Note: Hamilton bought a total of 17 acres (6.9 ha) from Bradhurst. According to one account, Hamilton's estate measured 35 acres and 3 1/2 roods, or 1,562,715 square feet (145,181 m^{2}; 15 ha), after all acquisitions were completed.) The house was the only residence that Hamilton owned in his lifetime. Hamilton, wishing to landscape the area around the house, consulted physician David Hosack for guidance. Hamilton planted a circle of 13 sweet gum trees, symbolizing the Thirteen Colonies, (Note: Although the trees were allegedly gifted by George Washington, the New York City Landmarks Preservation Commission says that this is unlikely because Washington died before the estate was even acquired.) and he also planted a circular flower bed. Though early-20th-century sources described him as an avid farmer and gardener, he had very little free time and described the house itself as his hobby.

Hamilton worked in Lower Manhattan, a three-hour round trip from his estate; he traveled to his law office by stagecoach several times a week. His house was close to the Albany Post Road, which led directly to Lower Manhattan. Hamilton also had a second residence in Lower Manhattan, and his wife maintained the Grange during his absences. Details of Hamilton's life at the Grange are known only from accounts written by his relatives, friends, and followers. The historians Alfred Mongin and Anne D. Whidden wrote that the Grange housed not only the Hamiltons and their seven children, (Note: The Hamiltons had eight children in total, but their firstborn, Philip the first, died before they moved in.) but also the children of friends or family. The Schuyler family, to whom the Hamiltons were especially close, were frequent visitors, as were Alexander's friends Gouverneur Morris and Rufus King. The Hamiltons also hosted other guests such as jurist James Kent and French royal Jérôme Bonaparte. During the winter, the family stayed in a house on Fulton Street in Lower Manhattan.

Hamilton lived at the house for two years, dying after his duel with Aaron Burr on July 11, 1804. Although he had been a successful lawyer, Hamilton was "essentially land poor" when he died. His legal estate was in significant debt because of the Grange's high cost; his account books showed that he spent $11,840.27 (equivalent to $254,566 in 2025) in six months. The Grange estate was secured for about $20,000, an amount that included liens on the actual property, and a consortium was formed to control the legal estate. One writer said that "going into debt to maintain his station gives a hint of" Hamilton's life. Archibald Gracie bought the house at auction in 1805 for $30,000 and set up a trust to take over the estate. The purchase price excluded approximately $7,600 in mortgage loans that Hamilton had received from the site's previous owners, Schieffelin and Bradhurst.

Eliza Hamilton took title to the Grange on July 6, 1805, but Hamilton's legal estate still owed about $55,000, which was only repaid after additional land had been sold off. The last debts on the house were paid off in 1808. During the 1810s, Eliza Hamilton received land and payment from the federal government to compensate for her husband's military service. Eliza is recorded as having sent correspondence from the Grange through at least 1819. Although a 20th-century source describes the family as having rented out the house, a 1980 study did not find records of Eliza renting the Grange.

=== Subsequent residents ===
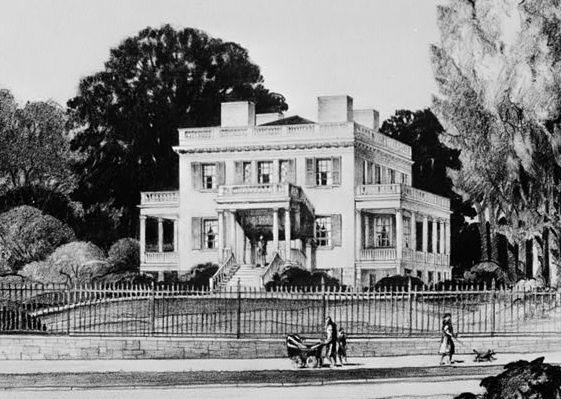
Drawing of the original Grange before 1889

Eliza Hamilton is recorded as having sold the Grange in 1833; at the time, the estate covered over 32 acres (13 ha). The house was sold for $25,000 (equivalent to $834,000 in 2025). The buyer, a banker named Moses Henriques, also assumed a $9,000 mortgage that had been placed on the property. Henriques promptly sold the house to real estate speculator Theodore E. Davis, who resold it to Isaac G. Pearson in 1835 for $52,511 (equivalent to $1,639,000 in 2025). Pearson put up the house as collateral for a $15,000 mortgage loan given to Samuel Ward. The latter took over ownership of the house in 1845. The family of Ward's brother, the lawyer William G. Ward, moved into the house. Although William Ward died in 1848, his widow and the families of his sons continued to live there during the summer.

By the mid-1850s, the area was gradually densifying. The house was accessed only by a driveway that led to the former King's Bridge Road, and there was a stable to the rear and a lawn in front of the house. Although the views to the north and south were blocked by higher ground and trees, respectively, the house overlooked the Hudson River to the west and the Harlem River, East River, and Long Island Sound to the east. The oldest known picture of the house was taken around 1864, when the Ward family still lived in the house. The Emigrant Industrial Savings Bank took over the house in 1876 after foreclosing on the property. At the time, the Wards owed $53,402 (equivalent to $1,615,000 in 2025).

The house was sold for $312,500 in 1879 (equivalent to $10,798,000 in 2025). The buyer, Anthony Mowbray, resold the house for the same amount to William H. DeForest, his client and business partner, the month afterward. The New York Times wrote in 1880 that the house had fallen into disrepair. At the time, "two good-natured Irish families" occupied the premises and allowed visitors to look at the house. The DeForest family removed some mantels and mirrors. One observer, writing in 1886, said the Third Avenue Cable Railroad now ran right outside the house and the stone fence around the estate was crumbling. Another account stated that none of the original furniture remained.

=== Subdivision of the old estate ===
When DeForest acquired the Grange estate, he intended to divide it into parcels. The estate was thus split up into 300 land lots; the Times described the remaining portion of the estate in 1880 as covering 8 or 10 acres (3.2 or 4.0 ha). By the mid-1880s, the house was in danger of being demolished to make way for the Manhattan street grid, which had just reached Harlem. The site had been condemned since it was in the path of 143rd Street; in particular, the street ran through the northwest corner of the house. Had the house not been moved, the street would have cut through the porches diagonally. Most of the streets in the neighborhood, except for 143rd Street, had been laid out by 1884. The Manhattan street grid had been built through the rest of the old estate by 1920, and Hamilton Place, which followed the old Bloomingdale Road, remained intact.

The Third Avenue Cable Railroad opened in the late 1880s on what is now Amsterdam Avenue, which spurred development in the area. The plots that comprised the Hamilton Grange estate were offered for sale in late 1887, and many lots were sold on the condition that they remain in residential use. Real estate developer Amos Cotting acquired the lots south of 143rd Street. The remainder of the original estate was developed in the late 19th and early 20th centuries, when the construction of the New York City Subway's first line spurred development in the area. The neighborhood was initially known as Hamilton Grange. The estate's sweet gum trees were enclosed by a fence in the 1880s, when they started to die. The trees were supposed to be sold in early 1892, but O. B. Potter bought the site, preserving the trees. They were placed for sale again in 1898, and the few remaining trunks were felled in 1908.

== Use by St. Luke's Church ==
St. Luke's Episcopal Church, which was based in Greenwich Village but whose congregation had moved uptown, was looking for a new site in 1888. The church's rector, Isaac Henry Tuttle, looked at several lots in Upper Manhattan until he came across a site at the corner of Convent Avenue and 141st Street, within the boundary of the original Hamilton Grange. One of his old congregants offered $5,000 to move the congregation there. The church agreed in late 1888 to buy the lots on the northeastern corner of that intersection. After Tuttle saw the Grange while visiting his recent acquisition, he contacted Cotting, who decided to give the house to the congregation for use as a temporary chapel. The house was one of a few remaining late-17th and early-18th-century mansions in Upper Manhattan at the time.

=== Relocation and 1890s ===
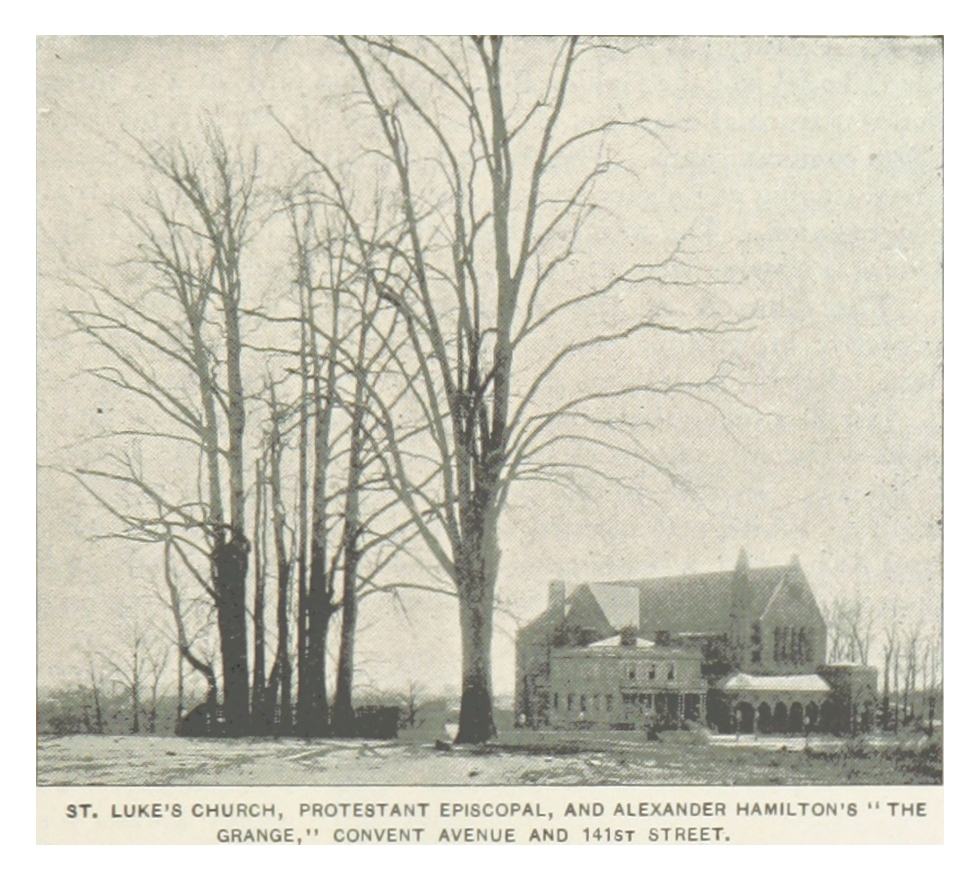
With church, 1893

In November 1888, St. Luke's submitted an application to the New York City Department of Buildings (DOB) requesting that the house be relocated; the DOB approved the request the next month. At the time, the house was recorded as occupying an irregular lot of 125 by 200 by 100 feet (38 by 61 by 30 m). The church moved the house to 287 Convent Avenue, approximately 250 feet (76 m) south of the original location; the house itself traveled about 500 feet (150 m). Relocation commenced on December 5, 1888, and a subsequent renovation of the house was finished by the end of June 1889. The original front and rear porches were removed, and the front porch was moved to the western or left side of the house. Even so, the building protruded slightly into the Rockefeller family's property to the north.

At its new site, the house was set back 33 feet (10 m) from the street. After the house was relocated, the interior stairs and some partitions were also modified. St. Luke's initially used the house for services, holding its first service there on April 28, 1889. The octagonal rooms in the middle of the house were converted into a chapel. By 1890, St. Luke's was planning to erect a church building on part of its site. St. Luke's erected a Richardsonian Romanesque building to the south between 1892 and 1895, which wrapped around the house slightly. Part of the Grange was shaved off to accommodate the new building. St. Luke's used the house as a rectory after the first part of the new building opened on December 18, 1892, and the rector prepared his sermons in the house's large rooms.

By 1894, the house had developed severe structural issues; for example, it needed a new roof. Although members of St. Luke's congregation believed it would be more cost-effective to just demolish the house, Tuttle thought that the building could be repaired. The new roof cost $1,500 (equivalent to $56,000 in 2025). After the roof was repaired, Tuttle set aside two of the rooms for the church and related organizations. Following Tuttle's death in 1896, a day school leased part of the mansion. The day school, operated by Ella K. Morgan, occupied either the first story or the basement.

=== 1900s to early 1920s ===
A decade after the first relocation of Hamilton Grange, there were attempts to relocate it again to a more pastoral setting. A bill in the New York State Senate was introduced in early 1900, providing $50,000 for the state government to acquire Hamilton Grange's original site and relocate the house there. Alexander Hamilton Post pushed for the introduction of another State Senate bill in 1901, allowing the New York City government to acquire the house and maintain it. The 1901 bill failed, but efforts to preserve the house continued. A companion bill to the 1900 legislation, providing $50,000 for the state to take over the house, was introduced in the New York State Assembly in 1903. One newspaper estimated that it would cost $150,000 to convert the original site to a park. The local board of improvement voted in favor of the relocation at the beginning of 1905, but the state legislature voted against acquiring the house. The Daughters of the American Revolution (DAR) placed a commemorative tablet on the house's steps in 1907, and the DAR also pressured the city government to acquire the house to officially preserve it.

Although the state legislature passed a law in 1908 which permitted the city government to take over the house and relocate it to St. Nicholas Park, the house remained in place. Morgan's day school operated in the house until 1909, when her lease was canceled. Afterward, the house's facade was painted in 1909. The interior was refurbished and repurposed, with offices and meeting rooms on the first floor and living spaces for the rector and curate on the second floor. Further changes to the interior were made in 1914, when the offices in the rear became a kitchen and maid's bedroom; the meeting spaces in the octagonal rooms became a parlor and a dining room; and the basement was converted to living space for the sexton's family. In addition, the facade was again painted, and the site was landscaped.

Edward Hagaman Hall, executive secretary of the American Scenic and Historic Preservation Society (ASHPS), began negotiating with St. Luke's Church in 1912 to take over the house and preserve it. St. Luke's rector G. Ashton Oldham was reluctant to give away Hamilton Grange but considered selling it for at least $30,000. These discussions were truncated due to the onset of World War I. Other organizations, including the Sons of the American Revolution and the Grand Army of the Republic, also sought to buy the house. A six-story apartment building was completed in the early 1920s to the north, thereby enclosing the house. St. Luke's began to perceive the house as a liability over the years, and the Hamilton Society of Chicago proposed relocating the house to that city in the early 1920s. The ASHPS opposed the house's relocation to Chicago and resumed its advocacy for the house's preservation. A writer for The New York Times said in the mid-1920s that the relocation of the house was worse than if a portion of the house had remained in its original location.

== Use as museum and memorial ==
=== American Scenic and Historic Preservation Society operation ===
==== Establishment of museum ====
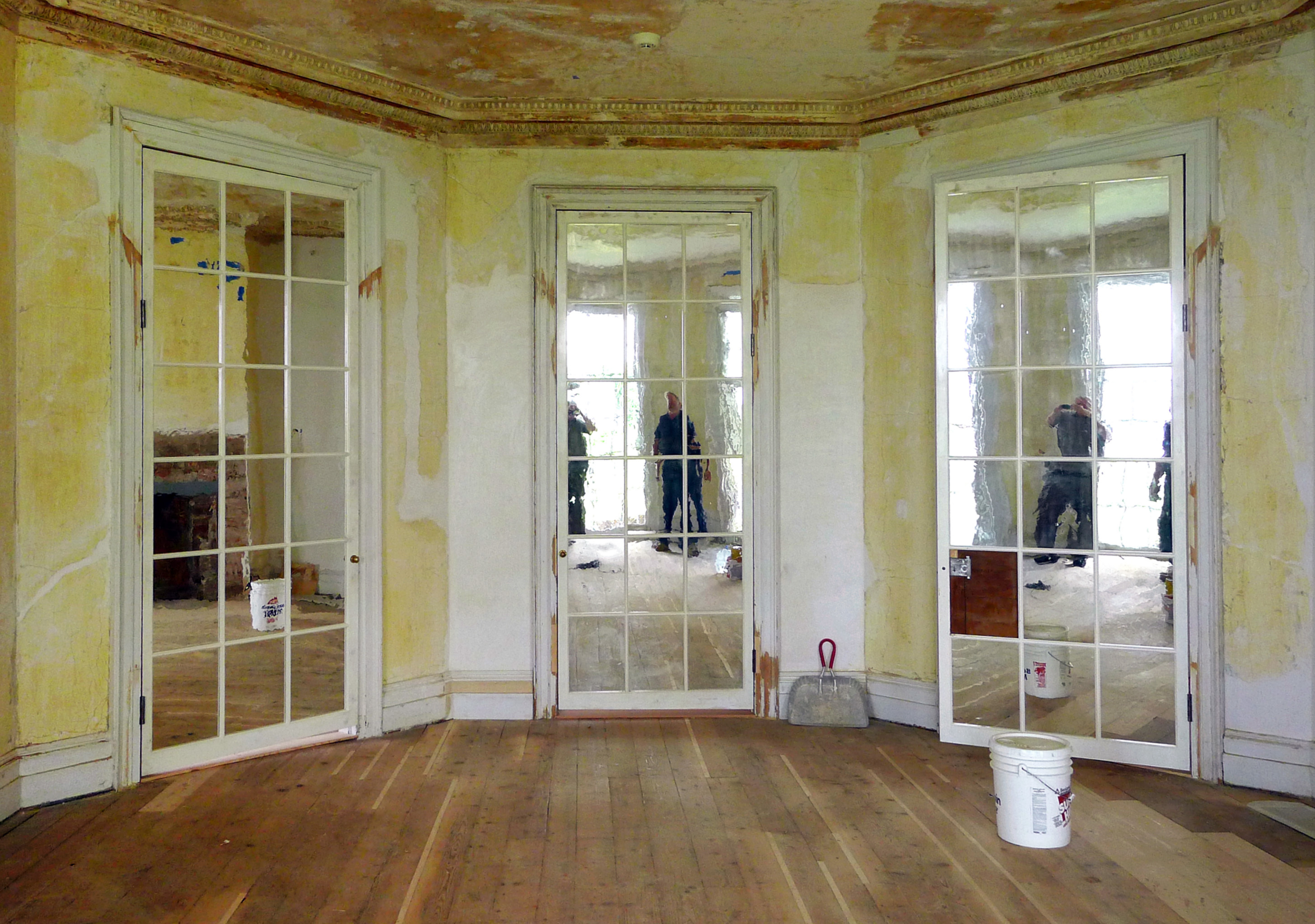
Interior of the Grange's dining room

The ASHPS bought the Grange in November 1924 after anonymous donors paid $50,000 for the house. The donors, later revealed as bankers George Fisher Baker and J. P. Morgan Jr., also established a $50,000 trust fund to pay for upkeep. The ASHPS planned to convert the house into a museum, and it appointed a committee of several people, including two of Hamilton's descendants, to collect memorabilia for the museum. At the time, the Grange was the only remaining building associated with Hamilton; his law office and residences in Lower Manhattan had been replaced, while his home in Weehawken, New Jersey, had been demolished. The house's wallpaper and woodwork had been restored, and many of the other interior decorations remained unchanged from when Hamilton occupied the house. In the long run, the ASHPS planned to move the house elsewhere so it could be restored fully.

The society wanted to raise money for a renovation but still did not have sufficient funds by 1928; it hoped to raise $125,000. The ASHPS launched a fundraising campaign in early 1929 and renovated the roof the same year. Further renovations took place between 1932 and 1933, when electricity was installed and one side of the house was painted. The balustrades were also removed to allow the repainting of the three other facades, which was never completed due to a lack of money. The house opened to the public in 1933. Furniture and decorative objects associated with the Hamilton family were displayed there.

==== 1930s to early 1960s ====
Initially, the house was open to the public every day and did not charge admission fees. In early 1934, the DAR's Washington Heights chapter moved into a room on the second floor. With the ASHPS's permission, the DAR redecorated one of the house's living rooms. A statue of Hamilton by William Ordway Partridge was relocated from the Hamilton Club of Brooklyn after the club closed in 1936, and it was dedicated outside the Grange that October. By the early 1940s, numerous people were donating Colonial memorabilia to the museum, regardless of whether the objects were related to Hamilton. As early as 1949, there were proposals to move the house to a park, although local real-estate developers opposed the move. By then, the house was dilapidated; some of the upstairs rooms did not have any furnishings, and the facade needed to be repainted.

As early as 1950, the ASHPS was asking New York City park commissioner Robert Moses to relocate the Grange to Claremont Park, where the Claremont Inn was being razed. At the time, the group's members felt that the Grange had degraded to a "shabby" condition. The city government asked the state legislature in 1955 to move the house to the City College of New York (CCNY)'s campus, as that site was close to buses and the subway. Had the house been moved to CCNY, the campus's gates would have had to be disassembled. The New York State Assembly passed a bill that March to permit the house's relocation to the CCNY campus, and governor W. Averell Harriman approved the bill the next month. The society planned to ask local banks for $400,000 because Hamilton had helped establish the modern U.S. banking system. During a 1957 tour of the house, Assembly member Mildred F. Taylor found that the building was in poor condition and that it was closed during the midday.

The Grange had still not been relocated by early 1958, and the ASHPS was raising $375,000 to move the house to the CCNY campus. Largely white philanthropists also wished to relocate the house southward, away from the majority-black Hamilton Heights neighborhood, and there were also proposals to move the house to Riverside Park or the Cloisters. Ultimately, no action was taken on any of the relocation proposals. Preservationists also proposed relocating the apartment building that abutted the house to its north. By the early 1960s, the house saw few visitors but was targeted by thieves on several occasions. The house was deteriorating and had a single, worn-down plaque commemorating its status.

=== National Park Service operation ===
==== Takeover and preservation ====
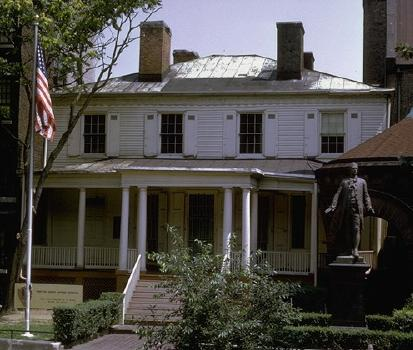
The Convent Avenue location of the home

In May 1960, U.S. Senator Jacob Javits introduced a bill in Congress to designate Hamilton Grange as a national memorial, and the Grange was designated a National Historic Landmark that December. The United States Department of the Interior approved the creation of the Hamilton Grange National Memorial on the condition that the city donate land within the CCNY campus for the house's relocation. Congress authorized the national memorial in early 1962, mandating that the property be relocated before a restoration could take place. That May, U.S. President John F. Kennedy signed a bill to create the memorial, authorizing the National Park Service (NPS) to take over the site from the ASHPS. Javits and U.S. Representative John V. Lindsay estimated that it would cost the federal government $300,000–$400,000 to restore the Grange.

When Congress had designated the national memorial, it had appropriated $460,000 for the house's restoration, of which $282,000 was for the relocation. A study by the ASHPS indicated that the house was structurally sound, and another report showed that the building could be moved if it were split into two pieces. Despite these reports, visitors were advised not to lean on railings or use the stairs to the east, and there were holes in the floor and ceiling. The NPS requested bids to relocate the house in June 1964, but the cheapest bid was for $417,000, and the CCNY site was ultimately rejected due to the high cost of relocation. Local residents organized in opposition to the relocation, and St. Luke's rector David Johnson did not want the house to be moved unless it was adjacent to the church. Ultimately, various attempts to relocate the site failed due to local opposition. The New York Daily News wrote that, while other historical sites in the city were deteriorating because of neglect, the Grange was crumbling because "too many people" were interested in its preservation.

Hamilton Grange was added to the National Register of Historic Places on October 15, 1966, the day the National Historic Preservation Act of 1966 went into effect. The house was partially restored during the mid-1960s, reopening in 1967. At the time, many of the house's original artifacts were stored in Sagamore Hill. The New York City Landmarks Preservation Commission (LPC) designated the house as a city landmark in August 1967. In its designation report, the LPC recommended moving the building to St. Nicholas Park so it could be fully restored.

==== 1970s and 1980s ====
Local civic groups such as the Hamilton Heights Homeowners Association used the house for meetings during the late 20th century. A mayoral committee published a report in 1972, recommending that the NPS take action to attract visitors to five historic sites in Manhattan, including the Grange. The report suggested that the house could be used to educate black students and that it could be renovated if Congress appropriated $500,000. The house was designated as part of the Hamilton Heights Historic District in 1974. The Hamilton statue outside the house was cleaned in 1978. The Grange was closed for an extensive renovation in 1979. During its closure, the house was repeatedly broken into, although all the items in the house had been cleared out before the renovation. The firm of Meadows Woll Architects was hired in 1980 to study the feasibility of moving the Grange, and the NPS commissioned a 600-page study of the house.

The house reopened in July 1983 after the renovation was finished. In 1986, the NPS decided to close all national memorials and monuments in Manhattan on Sundays, including Hamilton Grange. The NPS announced in 1987 that the house would remain in place and would be renovated for $3 million. By then, the house was completely bare except for two side chairs and a piano in the octagonal rooms. Due to local opposition to the relocation, U.S. Representative Charles Rangel wanted to change the law authorizing the Hamilton Grange National Memorial, allowing the house to be restored at Convent Avenue. Local groups hosted tours of the house to raise money for the project, and the New York Post also agreed to donate some money for the house's renovation.

==== 1990s ====
By the early 1990s, the house had decayed significantly due to neglect and inclement weather. At the time, it had 40–50 thousand or 70 thousand visitors per year. Visitation was limited by the fact that there was no parking or wheelchair access, although the site was accessible via bus and subway. Georgette Nelms, the superintendent of NPS sites in Manhattan, began looking for contractors to stabilize the house's foundation in 1991. Severe deterioration forced the NPS to close the home to the public entirely in 1992. Early that year, workers commenced the first phase of a four-part renovation, which included repainting the facade, replacing the roof, and fixing masonry and woodwork. Rangel obtained a $750,000 federal appropriation for this work, and he successfully requested another $1 million from the United States Congress that October. The Hamilton Heights Homeowners Association held tours of historic houses in the area to raise money for the Grange's restoration. The Grange had few visitors and, according to Rangel, got less attention than Grant's Tomb.

The NPS proposed moving Hamilton Grange in early 1993, and it held five panel discussions about the relocation during that year. Some local residents said the planned relocation of the Grange would disrupt the community; one group of opponents collected 1,200 signatures for a petition against the plan, while another group demonstrated outside the house. The NPS planned to build a community center on the Convent Avenue site, but opponents remained skeptical. Other local residents and Manhattan Community Board 9 supported the plan, stating that the relocation would turn the Grange into a tourist attraction and would allow Hamilton Grange to be restored. Supporters of the relocation said the Grange could not be restored at the Convent Avenue site. Community Board 9 voted in March 1994 to let the relocation proceed, allowing the NPS to form a community group for the project and request $10.6 million from the federal government. By 1995, the NPS was planning to seek $11 million from Congress.

The NPS indicated that it would move the mansion to St. Nicholas Park, which not only allowed the house to be placed in a rustic setting but also occupied part of Hamilton's original estate. A visitor center would have been built on the Convent Avenue site as part of the project. Congress gave around $1.5 million for the relocation, although the house needed another $9.7 million to fund the full project. The relocation process was delayed because the NPS did not have control of the St. Nicholas Park site; in the meantime, the agency spent $400,000 to stabilize the mansion. The NPS announced in January 1998 that it would reopen three of Hamilton Grange's rooms for three days a week. The agency wanted to increase the public's interest in the house before the mansion was relocated. A State Senate bill to approve the house's relocation stalled because it was sponsored by a Democrat, while the Senate was controlled by Republicans. New York governor George Pataki signed the bill in October 1999, allowing the New York City government to give the NPS an easement within St. Nicholas Park to permit the Grange's relocation.

==== 2000s renovation ====
U.S. Senator Daniel Patrick Moynihan wrote a letter to the NPS about the mansion's "deplorable" conditions in March 2000, and both houses of Congress passed legislation in late 2000 to permit the relocation. The NPS allocated $11 million to relocate the building in 2003. Upon the 200th anniversary of the duel that killed Hamilton, in July 2004, the house recorded about 1,000 monthly visitors. Hamilton Grange was closed to the public on May 7, 2006, to undergo architectural testing in preparation for relocating the house to St. Nicholas Park. Because the house was so tightly hemmed in by other buildings, the southern section of the house was disassembled first. John G. Waite Associates and Skidmore, Owings & Merrill were hired to draw up plans for a renovation of the Grange. The New York City government hoped that the relocation and renovation would attract visitors.

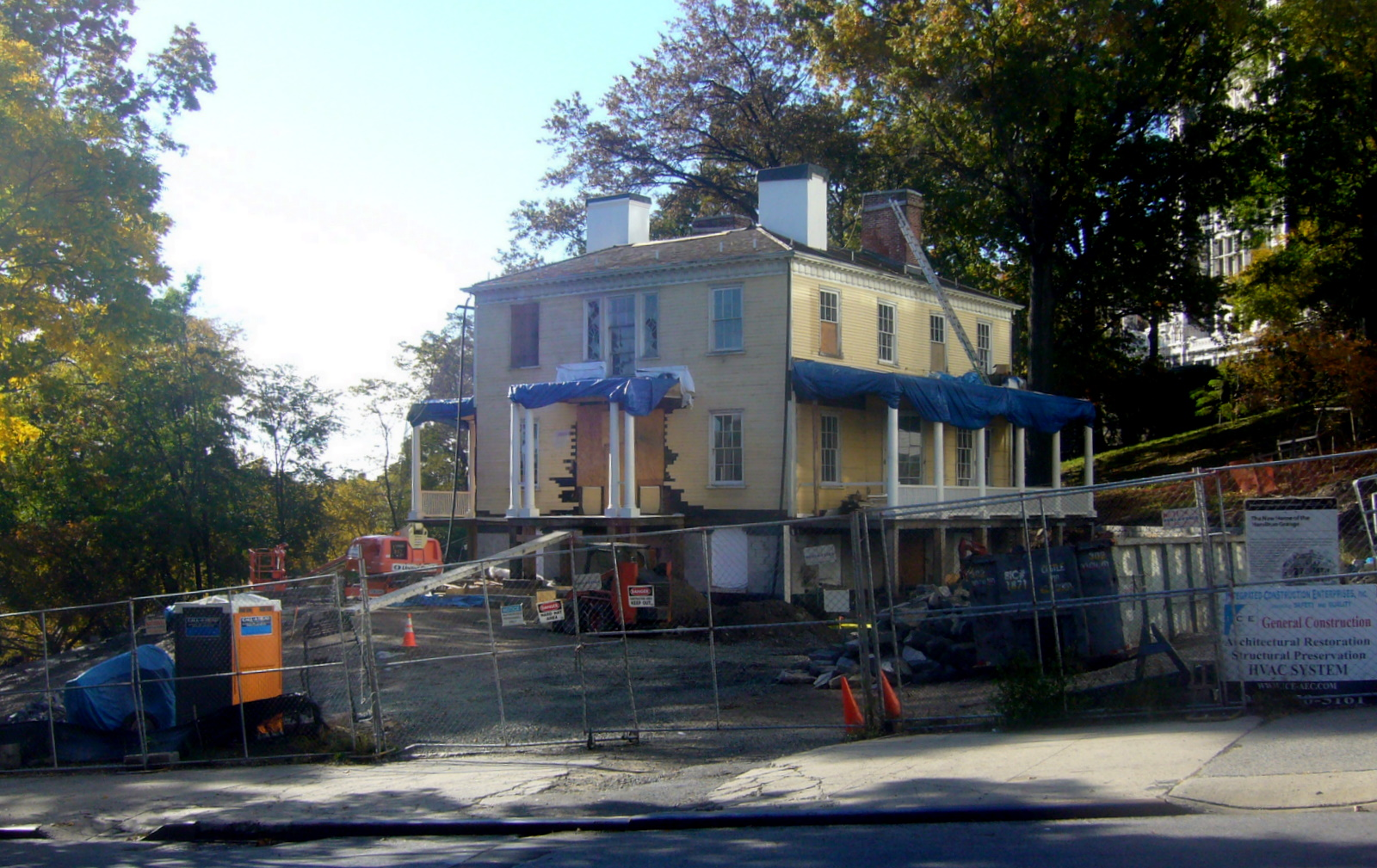
Hamilton Grange at St. Nicholas Park in October 2009

The building was raised on hydraulic jacks over 20 days in 2008, with wood cribbing installed under the foundation. Hamilton Grange was raised to a height of about 35 feet (11 m) or 40 feet (12 m). The house was then moved on rollers to wooden stilts in the middle of Convent Avenue; the stilts were disassembled, leaving the house resting on nine dollies by the end of May 2008. The NPS hired Wolfe House and Building Movers of Pennsylvania because that firm could move the house in one piece. Since the house was to be rolled down a six percent slope, four brakes were placed on each dolly to prevent the house from rolling away. The house was then fitted with interior bracing and was wrapped in chains. The statue in front of the house was placed in storage and later reinstalled in front of St. Luke's Church.

Before the house was to be moved, there were disagreements and legal disputes about its orientation. The NPS planned to rotate the house 180 degrees so it faced northeast; if the house retained its original southwest orientation, it would face a cliff in St. Nicholas Park. Everything in the house's path, such as street lamps and overhead wires, also had to be removed before the relocation took place. On June 7, 2008, the house was rolled half a block south on Convent Avenue and then one block east on 141st Street to the new St. Nicholas Park location over six hours. David W. Dunlap of The New York Times calculated its speed over the 500-foot (150 m) distance at 0.04 miles per hour (0.70 in/s; 18 mm/s). A group known as the Friends of Hamilton Grange filed a lawsuit over the house's orientation just after the house was moved but before it was placed on its foundation. The New York Daily News reported that the relocation itself comprised approximately two-fifths of the renovation project's planned $8.4 million cost. In mid-June, a federal judge threw out the Friends of Hamilton Grange's lawsuit, ruling that the house might be damaged even more if it were rotated to face southwest.

After the house was secured to its new foundation, workers began restoring it. The federal government provided another $3 million in funding through a stimulus package. The piazzas were rebuilt, and the main entrance was restored at its original position. Restoration architects spent 18 months consulting documents to ensure that the restoration was historically accurate. The grounds were landscaped with 13 sweet gum trees, a stone wall, a circular rose garden, and paths. The renovation also included new electrical and mechanical systems, and Fallon and Wilkinson were hired to create replicas of the original furniture. During the renovation, contractors rediscovered some of the original materials, using them to rebuild some of the original details. The project cost $14.5 million in total.

==== Early 2010s to present ====
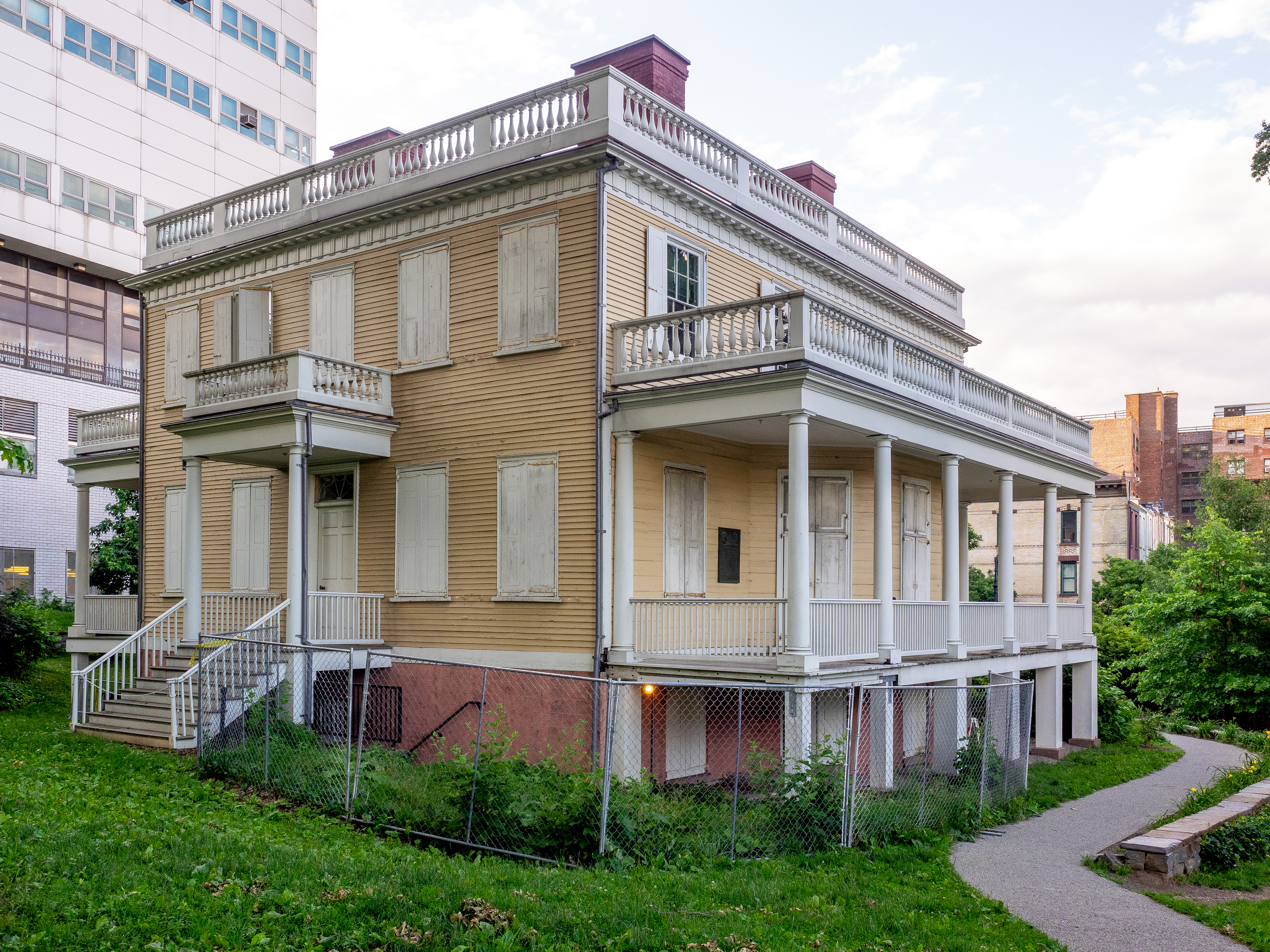
Patio of the restored house

The Grange reopened to the general public on September 17, 2011. A ceremony was held with Hamilton descendants in attendance and tours of the restored interiors. At the time of the reopening, only some of the first-floor rooms had been restored, while the second floor was closed. NPS officials said that other parts of the Grange had not been restored because of a paucity of documentation. In the renovated house, a visitor center is located in the entirely newly constructed basement floor. Fergus M. Bordewich wrote in The Wall Street Journal that the relocated house "will gaze out from its perch over one of the most vibrant black neighborhoods in America", namely Hamilton Heights.

The house saw 21,000 annual visitors by 2014. Hamilton Grange's popularity increased significantly after the Broadway musical Hamilton opened in 2015, and many people who saw the musical went to the Grange afterward. The house saw 35,000 visitors in 2015 and another 35,000 in the first five months of 2016, with a record 85,603 in 2017. In 2024, the site saw 63,647 visitors.

== Architecture ==
John McComb Jr. designed Hamilton Grange in the Federal style; it is one of the only remaining residential buildings with which he was involved. The Grange differed significantly from most of McComb's other designs, which generally were either designed in the Georgian style or resembled more typical Federal buildings. In contrast to other Federal-style structures, the Grange's architectural elements were resized to emphasize different aspects of the facade, such as its height; one report referred to the design as "squat and somewhat clumsy". At the time of the Grange's construction, McComb was still experimenting with architectural styles.

Although McComb largely designed the house based on Alexander's wishes, Eliza and her father Philip also influenced the design, drawing on their experiences living in the Schuyler Mansion in Albany. No extant elevation drawings for the house have been identified, but parts of the design may be derived from pattern books and from other buildings. Design features, such as archways and octagonal rooms, may have been inspired by the Morris–Jumel Mansion at what is now 160th Street. Other influences may have included Robert Morris's 1759 book Selected Architecture, as well as the interior of a pavilion at Kedleston Hall in Derbyshire, England.

The house is two stories tall with a ground-level basement. It weighs approximately 298 short tons (266 long tons; 270 t). The front elevation of the facade, which contains the main entrance, faced west-southwest at its original location and south at its Convent Avenue location. The front elevation was reoriented to the northeast when it was moved to St. Nicholas Park. (Note: In this article, relative directions are used. The corresponding compass directions, and the former compass directions, are: Front/main elevation – northeast (formerly south at Convent Avenue); Left elevation – southeast (formerly west at Convent Avenue); Rear elevation – southwest (formerly north at Convent Avenue); Right elevation – northwest (formerly east at Convent Avenue); At the house's first location, the front elevation faced southwest.) As built, the house had a rectangular plan, measuring 46.5 by 50 feet (14.2 by 15.2 m). A piazza extends the whole widths of the left and right elevations, while the front and rear elevations each had a portico. The original main entrance on the front elevation was restored when the house was moved to St. Nicholas Park.

=== Exterior ===
==== Facade ====
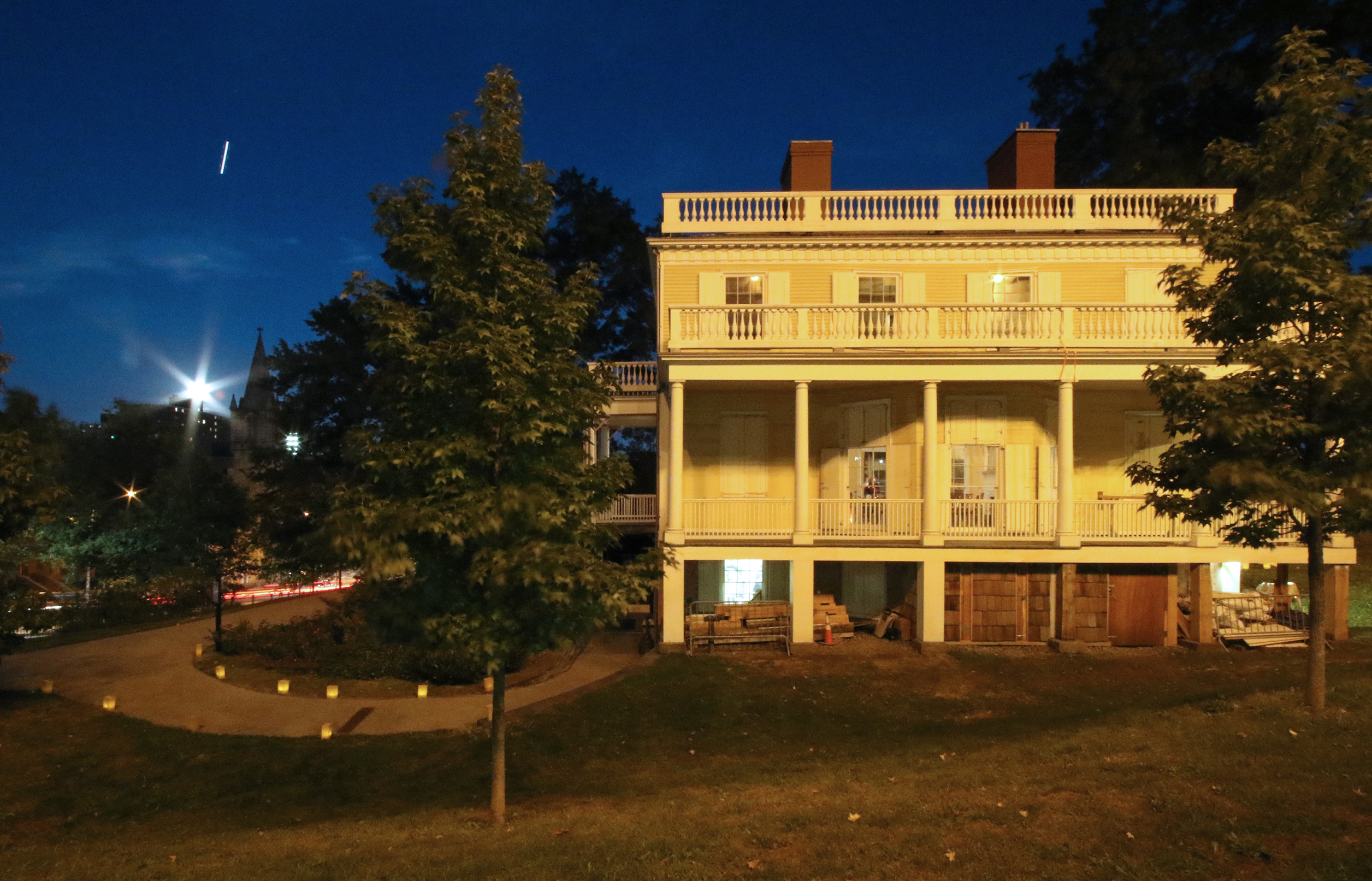
Right facade of the Grange at night

When the Grange was at its original location, its foundation was made of ashlar sandstone. A rubblestone foundation was built at Convent Avenue when the house was first relocated. Another foundation with a basement was constructed in St. Nicholas Park when the house was moved a second time. The basement at St. Nicholas Park is at ground level.

On the first and second stories, the main facade uses flush siding, while the rear facade uses clapboard siding. Flush siding is also used on the lower parts of the left and right elevations, and clapboard siding is used on the upper sections of these elevations. In addition, there are trim boards at each corner of the house, as well as sill boards on the front and rear elevations. Most of the windows in the house are double-hung sash windows. There are protruding triple-hung bay windows on the left and right elevations, sheltered by the piazzas, as well as a tripartite window directly above the main facade's entrance. The windows are flanked by different types of shutters; the panels on the double-hung windows' shutters are flush with the facade, while those on the triple-hung windows' shutters are recessed. Above the second story, an entablature, designed with elements of the Doric order, runs across the entire facade of the main house. Additional entablatures run horizontally across the tops of the piazzas.

The original front portico was flanked by two pairs of Doric columns and had Douglas fir floors and redwood balustrades. It was accessed by a wooden stair that originally ascended half a story; the stair had been rebuilt at least three times by the 1980s. The front entrance door is designed in the Federal style, with sidelights on either side, and there is a semicircular transom window above the door. There are two pairs of pilasters on either side of the door. When the building was relocated to 287 Convent Avenue, one of the side entrances was converted into the main entrance, while the original front door was sealed off. The rear portico was demolished at that time, and the front portico and entrance door were moved to the left elevation. The two porticos were restored to their original positions in 2011.

The piazzas on the left and right elevations are similar in design, with splined fir floorboards and Douglas fir balustrades. Each piazza is surrounded by six freestanding columns and two engaged columns, which are all designed in the Doric order and support a small roof. When the house was located at 287 Convent Avenue, the main entrance was through the left elevation. Because the site sloped down to the east, there was a lower gallery and a subbasement beneath the right piazza (which at the time faced east). The lower gallery was supported by square Idaho white-pine columns and had Douglas fir floorboards. There were also brownstone blocks below the left piazza, which faced west. When the house was moved to St. Nicholas Park, both of the piazzas were elevated above the ground-level basement.

==== Roofs ====
The main section of the house is covered by a gently sloping hip roof. The roof was surrounded by a carved wood balustrade, which was installed at an unknown date and removed by the 1930s. The roof is supported by four sets of rafters, which are divided into lower and upper portions. The lower portions of each rafter were likely built along with the rest of the house, while the upper portions were probably added in 1835 when the roof was raised. The 1980 architectural report indicates that the roof was originally topped by a flat deck. The main roof was likely covered by a solid-lead flashing, which was replaced in 1894 by a tinplate covering and in 1929 by a standing seam metal roof. There are copper gutters at the edges of the roof.

The roof is topped by two non-functional wooden chimneys and two symmetrical brick chimneys that do work. The wooden chimneys are at the front of the house, while the brick chimneys at the rear. Both sets of chimneys were repaired in the late 1970s. The placement of the chimneys influenced the interior design, as the fireplaces in the basement and on the first and second floors had to be built atop each other.

The piazzas on either side of the house originally had nearly flat roofs with a slope of about 1:24, which were covered with red tinplate. Hip roofs with steeper slopes were installed in the mid-19th century, likely to improve drainage. During the mid-19th-century modifications, the piazzas' ceilings were lowered and rebuilt out of plaster and wooden lath. When St. Luke's Church was built in the 1890s, the front part of the left-hand piazza (facing the church to the south) was removed. The roofs were covered with sheet copper in 1929. Carved wood balustrades also surrounded the piazza roofs but were removed by the 1930s. When the original roofs were restored in the late 1970s, the roofs of the piazzas were covered with stainless steel. In addition, Douglas fir boards were installed on the piazzas' ceilings, matching the design of the original piazzas' ceilings. There are stainless steel gutters at the edges of the piazzas' and portico's roofs.

=== Interior ===
The house was built with 18 rooms. The first floor included the house's "public rooms", where guests were entertained, while the second floor had private living areas such as bedrooms. Both floors had five rooms plus a hallway, and the first floor also has a passageway. The first and second stories are connected by a staircase, which was originally on the left side of the house but was moved to the front when the Grange was first relocated. There is also a staircase from the second floor to the attic, and there may have been a stair from the first floor to the basement (although no evidence of the latter exists). The house was first equipped with running water in 1845, electricity in 1933, and security systems in 1980. It was heated by a coal-fired boiler between 1933 and 1967, when gas heating was introduced.

Throughout the house are decorations with Adam style influences. The Grange's first floor, second floor, and attic are supported by a wood frame with interior partitions, joists, and studs. Brick nogging and plaster coating were used to insulate the house. Ceiling joists and studs were covered with lath that was then coated with plaster. Six types of plaster cornices were installed around the house, though most of the cornices are plain. Doors, window frames, and baseboards have a wide variety of millwork decorations, while the floor is generally made of spruce planks. There are several fireplaces with marble or wooden mantels. Three types of doors and four types of windows were used throughout the house. Except for the fireplaces and an arch on the first floor, the interior has a plain design.

==== Basement ====
An account from the mid-19th century indicated that the original basement was used "for culinary purposes", with a kitchen and two fireplaces. This basement was demolished after the house was first relocated.

When the house was moved to Convent Avenue, a basement was built beneath the original house, with four windows facing east. The basement included a stair hall at the southwest (front left) corner, storage rooms at the southeast and northeast corners, a kitchen under the center of the west facade, a bathroom and electrical closet at the northwest corner. By the 1990s, the basement had an information desk, a meeting and theater space, an exhibition space, restrooms, and a bookstore. There was also a sub-basement with a boiler, a heater, and storage space. Though the sub-basement was at the same height as the ground at the eastern end of the site, there were no doors leading outside, and all the windows were sealed before 1978.

The modern-day basement has a theater and exhibition space. There is also a visitor center, which occupies space that corresponds to the original basement's ironing room and kitchen.

==== First floor ====
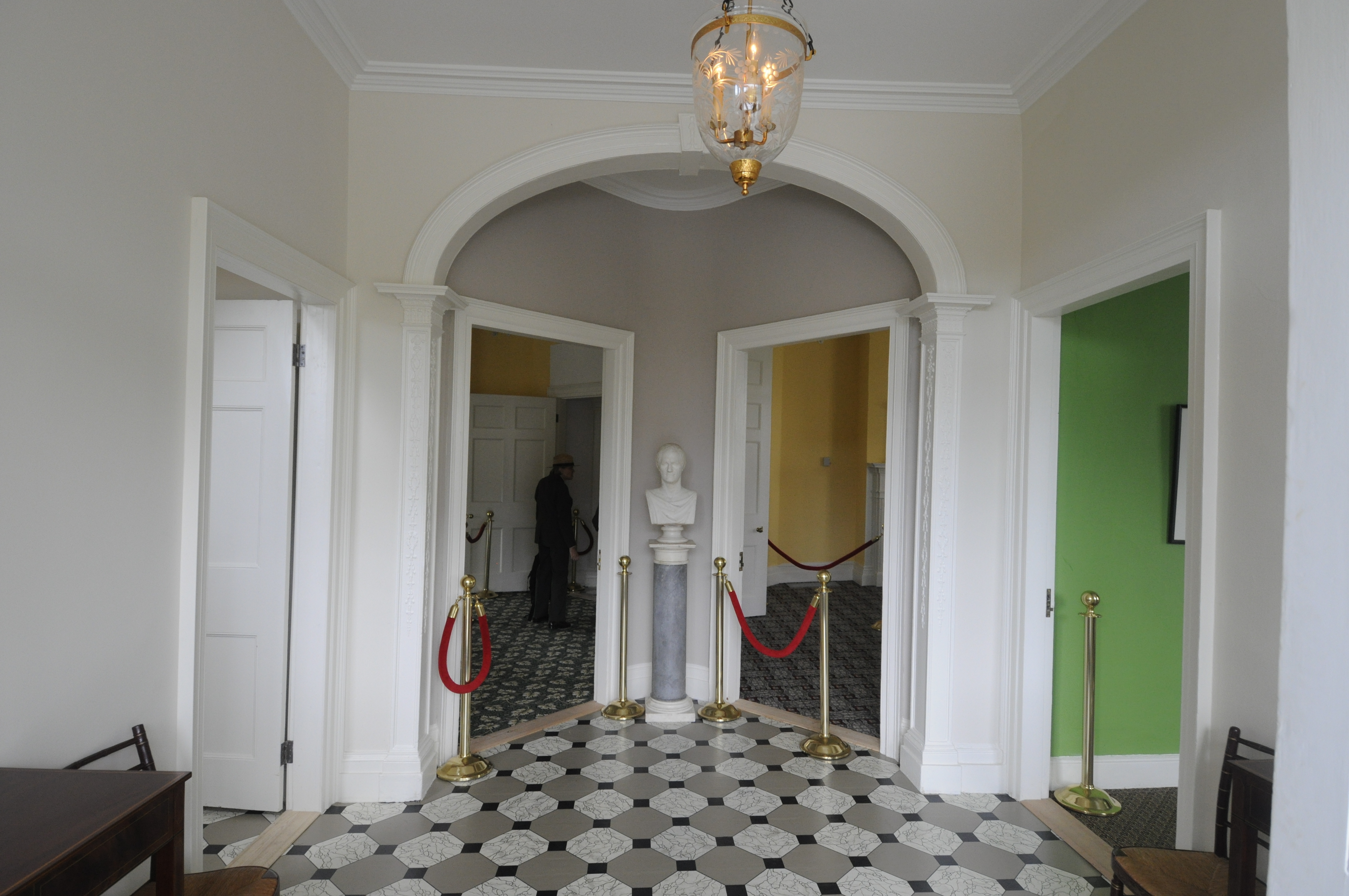
View of the pentagonal foyer

The original main stairway was to the left of the main entrance. The stair led up to the second floor and down to the basement. When the house was moved to Convent Avenue, the entry and stair hall were moved to the southwest (front left) corner of the first floor, measuring 12.67 by 23.75 feet (4 by 7 m) wide. At Convent Avenue, part of the ceiling was removed to make way for a staircase, which blocked the original front entrance. The entry and stair halls have three archways with floral bas-reliefs; two lead to octagonal rooms behind them, while the third leads to Hamilton's study to the right. A pentagonal apse or foyer connects the stair hall to the two octagonal rooms. The modern-day stair is to the left of the foyer, but the staircase has been relocated so it does not block the original front entrance.

At the front right corner of the house is Hamilton's study, also known as the southeast room. (Note: Compass directions of rooms, such as "southeast" and "southwest", are described in relation to the orientation of the house when it was at 287 Convent Avenue. After being relocated to St. Nicholas Park, the southeast corner was reoriented to the north, the southwest corner was reoriented to face west, etc.) This room measures about 12.67 by 12.67 feet (4 by 4 m) across; it was relatively small because Hamilton maintained a larger office downtown. The study retains almost all of its original ornament such as cornices, baseboards, door frames, and floorboards. The walls are painted bright green. Sources disagree on whether the color was meant to represent nature or was used because of its associations with the wealthy. There are a desk and bookshelves, stocked with five books from Hamilton's own collection.

There are two identical octagonal rooms behind the entry and stair halls, which span the entire width of the house and measure 18 by 24 feet (5.5 by 7.3 m) across. The one on the left (formerly the west octagon room) was likely used as a drawing room and is known as the parlor. The room includes three floor-to-ceiling triple-hung windows and a fireplace with a marble mantel. The walls are painted yellow. The octagonal room to the right (the east octagon room) was the dining room. It has very similar walls, ceilings, cornices, baseboards, door frames, floorboards, fireplace, and floor-to-ceiling triple-hung windows as the drawing room/parlor. Between the west and east octagon rooms was an ornate four-paneled wooden door, which in the 19th century was likely clad with mirrors. The rooms had views of the Hudson River to the west and the Harlem River to the east.

A pentagonal hallway, measuring 13 by 5.67 feet (4 by 2 m), extends from the octagonal rooms to the rear of the house. The hallway has four interior doorways. During the 20th century, the space occupied by the rear doorway became a window, and a bathroom was installed. The original purpose of the room at the rear left corner (the northwest room) is not known, but it may have been a bedroom. Although the room lacks a cornice, it has a baseboard design unique to the house, and there is a doorway leading to the rear hall. The windows in the first-floor northwest room have plain frames, and there was originally a fireplace in the room, although the fireplace was likely sealed in 1933. The original use of the rear-right room (the northeast room) is also not known but may have also been a bedroom. The decorations are similar to that of the northwest room, and there is also a baseboard and marble fireplace mantel.

==== Second floor ====
Originally, the second floor had separate bedrooms for Hamilton, his wife, their daughters, and their two eldest sons. The second floor is closed to the public. A 1995 NPS report cited the second floor as being too weak to support visitors; after the house was restored in 2011, the second floor was used as staff space. It is bisected by a hallway which runs from front to back, with three rooms each to the left and right. At the center of the house's front elevation is the front hall, which was modified in 1889 when the main stair was relocated. It retains many of its original decorations, such as woodwork, plasterwork, and moldings. Extending behind the front hall to the rear of the house is a central passageway which also retains many of its original decorations.

The southwest room at the front left corner of the second floor, dating from the 1889 renovation, occupied the site of the original stairwell; this room has since been replaced with a stairwell. The southeast room at the front right is similar to the southwest room, but it contains evidence of a former closet and stairs to the attic. The west center room and east center room respectively adjoin the left and right walls of the center hall and were originally very similar in design, with fireplaces and doorways; the west center room also had a closet, while the east center room had a stair to the attic (accessible from the center hall). At the rear of the house are the northwest room, northeast room, and a central bathroom, all accessed by a rear hall at the end of the central second-story passageway. Originally, the rooms in the rear comprised a single space, but the rooms were subdivided before 1820, likely to provide a bedroom for each Hamilton child. The rooms at either corner have fireplaces, and the northwest room also had a closet.

== Operation ==
Most of Hamilton's original belongings were sold after his death to other American institutions such as the Smithsonian Institution, New York Public Library, New-York Historical Society, and Museum of the City of New York. When the house first became a museum in the 1930s, its collection included portraits of Alexander and Eliza Hamilton painted by Works Progress Administration artists, as well as a pair of guns that Hamilton brought to his duel with Burr. In the mid-20th century, the house exhibited various objects such as a bust of Alexander Hamilton by Giuseppe Ceracchi; a dress worn by Eliza Hamilton; and a collection of books from the Hamiltons' family library. Other artifacts included a four-poster bed, cribs, and bed warmers from Hamilton's lifetime.

Many of the current objects in the house are replicas. Among the few surviving original artifacts are a mourning scarf from 1804 and a piano imported from Britain in the 1790s; the piano was made by Muzio Clementi. Just before the house's relocation to St. Nicholas Park, the house displayed items such as the piano, chairs, and a wine cooler. The modern-day exhibits include some of Hamilton's old books, papers, and furniture, as well as drawings and diagrams of the house created as part of the Historic American Buildings Survey. In the dining room are late-18th-century teacups with wooden handles, a replica of a wine cooler given by George Washington, and plates arranged for a meal. The parlor features five original chairs. There is also a bust of Hamilton in the entrance hall. Some of the objects in the collection are stored by the Gateway National Recreation Area.

The house's first floor and basement are open Wednesdays through Sundays. The NPS hosts guided tours with up to 15 people, although visitors can also tour the house on their own. Only four rooms are typically open to the public; the second floor is used only by staff. The NPS also operates a junior ranger program at the monument.

== Critical reception ==
Architecturally, the New York Sun called the house "a good example of the comfortable country house" of the early 19th century, and The New York Times described the house as "substantial rather than elegant". By 1926, the writer Chesla Sherlock lamented that "so little of the home he loved so well has been preserved to us", citing the fact that the house had been moved and all its furniture dispersed. A writer for the New York Amsterdam News said in 1962 that, despite the house's deterioration, its decorated floors, ceilings, and fireplace mantels "still speak of the era when it was the country home" of Hamilton. When the Grange was located at Convent Avenue, the historian Hugh Howard described the house as being hemmed in and forgotten about, akin to "a misplaced book on a library shelf".

Upon the house's reopening in 2011, The Wall Street Journal said that the house "at long last is a fitting monument to one of America's greatest Founding Fathers". A critic for the same newspaper described the relocation as successful both from a historical and architectural point of view, saying that the design "suggests a rationality that isn't accidental". The New York Times said the design gave "a kind of gracious pleasure taken in what was being made possible" and that the St. Nicholas Park site was an appropriate setting for the house. A writer for AM New York described the home in 2016 as nondescript but "something every New Yorker can enjoy", and the Chicago Tribune said the same year: "As impressive as the house is, its odd history is equally compelling." Frommer's guidebook gave the house one star out of three, criticizing the lack of original furniture and the small number of rooms on display.

The house's name inspired the monikers of two apartment buildings erected in the area, (Note: Specifically the structures at 476 West 144th Street and at 310 Convent Avenue) as well as the name of the Hamilton Grange Library on 145th Street. The surrounding neighborhood was also known as Hamilton Grange until the 1930s, when it became known as Hamilton Heights. Additionally, in 1934, a model of the Grange was created for the Museum of the City of New York.

== See also ==
- List of national memorials of the United States
- List of New York City Designated Landmarks in Manhattan above 110th Street
- National Register of Historic Places listings in Manhattan above 110th Street
