= Hugh Howard (historian) =

American historian, writer, and speaker (born 1952)

Hugh Howard (born 1952) is an American historian, writer, and speaker. He has written numerous books about architecture, art, and American presidents, but describes himself as a narrative historian: he seeks to use stories to capture the sweep of history, with facts, personalities, and places adding texture to events.

His most recent book, Architects of an American Landscape, published by Atlantic Monthly Press in 2022, examines the creative friendship of Frederick Law Olmsted, the co-designer of Central Park and founder of the discipline of landscape architecture, and Henry Hobson Richardson, the most admired American architect of the nineteenth century.

Previous books include Architecture's Odd Couple (Bloomsbury, 2015), also a dual biography, which looked at the careers of Frank Lloyd Wright and Philip Johnson, architects who bracketed the twentieth century and who had a complicated relationship as "frienemies." Howard has written two books concerning the architectural work of Thomas Jefferson, Thomas Jefferson, Architect (Rizzoli, 2003) and Dr. Kimball and Mr. Jefferson (Bloomsbury 2006), as well as a book about the birthing of American painting by the many who painted portraits of George Washington, The Painter's Chair (Bloomsbury, 2009).

He has also collaborated with photographer Roger Straus III on a series of large-format volumes, including Houses of the Founding Fathers (Workman, 2007), Houses of the Presidents and Houses of Civil War America (Little, Brown, 2012 and 2014, respectively).

== Career ==
Aside from writing books, Howard has written for dozens of publications including Smithsonian, The New York Times, The Washington Post, House Beautiful, Preservation, Early American Life, Traditional Homes, and others. He was the researcher, writer, and scout for a series of television specials produced by the A&E Network In Search of Palladio.

Prior to becoming a full-time writer, he was Vice President of the New York Times Book Company, Inc. In 2011, he was an Attingham scholar. He has served as a board member at various historical sites, including Mark Twain House and Museum, the Edna St. Vincent Millay Society, Cheekwood Estate and Gardens, and the Historic Eastfield Foundation, where he was the founding editor of The Eastfield Record.

== Personal life ==
Howard divides his time between the Hudson Valley in New York and New Hampshire's Upper Valley. He and his wife, Betsy, have two adult daughters. His memoir House-Dreams (Algonquin, 2003) recounts he design and construction of a Federal Revival-style home for his family in the mid-1990s.

== Published work ==
- Howard, Hugh (2022). Architects of an American Landscape: Henry Hobson Richardson and Frederick Law Olmsted, and the Reimagining of America's Public and Private Spaces. Atlantic Monthly Press. ISBN 9780802159236.
- Howard, Hugh (2016). Architecture's Odd Couple: Frank Lloyd Wright and Philip Johnson. Bloomsbury Press. ISBN 1620403757.
- Howard, Hugh; Straus, Roger (2014). Houses of Civil War America: The Homes of Robert E. Lee, Frederick Douglass, Abraham Lincoln, Clara Barton, and Others Who Shaped the Era. Little, Brown and Company. ISBN 978-0316227988.
- Howard, Hugh (2014). Mr. and Mrs. Madison's War: America's First Couple and the War of 1812. Bloomsbury Press. ISBN 978-1608193936.
- Howard, Hugh; Straus, Roger (2012). Houses of the Presidents: Childhood Homes, Family Dwellings, Private Escapes, and Grand Estates. Little, Brown and Company. ISBN 978-0316133272.
- Howard, Hugh; Straus III, Roger (2011). Writers of the American South: Their Literary Landscapes. Rizzoli Universe Promotional Books. ISBN 978-0789324146.
- Howard, Hugh (2009). The Painter's Chair: George Washington and the Making of American Art. Bloomsbury Press. ISBN 1596912448.
- Howard, Hugh (2007). Houses of the Founding Fathers: The Men who Made America and the Way They Lived. Artisan. ISBN 978-1579655105.
- Howard, Hugh (2006). Dr. Kimball and Mr. Jefferson: Rediscovering the Founding Fathers of American Architecture. Bloomsbury USA. ISBN 978-1582344553.
- Howard, Hugh; Kurzaj, Radek (2004). Colonial Houses: The Historic Homes of Williamsburg. Harry N. Abrams. ISBN 978-0810943391.
- Howard, Hugh; Strauss III, Roger (2003). Natchez: The Houses and History of the Jewel of the Mississippi. Rizzoli. ISBN 978-0847825721.
- Howard, Hugh (2003). Thomas Jefferson: Architect. Rizzoli. ISBN 978-0847825462.
- Howard, Hugh (2001). House-Dreams. Algonquin Books. ISBN 978-1565122932.
- Howard, Hugh (2001). Wright for Wright. Rizzoli. ISBN 978-0847823666.
- Howard, Hugh (1992). Preservationist's Progress: Architectural Adventures in Conserving Yesterday's Houses. Noonday Pr. ISBN 978-0374523404.
- Howard, Hugh (1989). How Old is This House?. Farrar Straus & Giroux. ISBN 978-0374173241.
- Howard, Hugh (1987). I'm Not Doing it Myself: The Comprehensive Guide to Managing a Home Construction or Renovation Project. Farrar Straus & Giroux. ISBN 978-0374520588.
- Howard, Hugh (1986). The Home Inspection Handbook. Main Street Books. ISBN 978-0385231947.
