= Henry Maunsell Schieffelin =

- Born: August 7, 1808; New York City
- Died: August 27, 1890 (aged 82); Alexandria, Egypt
- Spouse(s): Sarah Louisa Wagstaff; Sarah Minerva Kendall
- Relatives: William Henry Schieffelin (nephew); Ernest Howard Crosby (son-in-law)

Henry Maunsell Schieffelin (August 7, 1808 – July 27, 1890), was an American businessman, philanthropist and consul general in Liberia. He was a founding member and President of the New York Colonization Society who financed a mission to explore the interior of Liberia.

== Biography ==
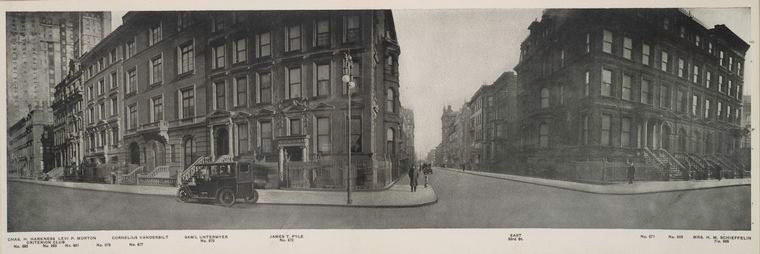
House No. 665 of Mrs. H.M. Schieffelin. East Fifth Avenue in 1911 (photograph by Burton Welles).

Henry Maunsell Schieffelin was the first son of Henry Hamilton Schieffelin and Maria Theresa (nee Bradhurst) Schieffelin. He married Sarah Louisa Wagstaff in 1835; the couple had no children. After his first wife’s death, Schieffelin married Sarah Minerva Kendall from Augusta, ME, in 1859. The couple had two daughters: Frances (nicknamed Fanny), and Mary (nicknamed Minnie). The family lived in a luxuriously furnished five-story house in Midtown Manhattan on 665 Fifth Avenue between East 52nd and East 53rd Street and kept a country home in Greek Revival style, called Ashton, in Yonkers, NY.

Schieffelin was a partner in Schieffelin & Co, managed by his nephew William Henry Schieffelin (son of his brother Samuel Bradhurst Schieffelin).

== Committee work ==
- Consul General in Liberia
- Founding member and Chairman of the New York Colonization Society
- Recruiter of students for Liberia College

Schieffelin donated to a school in Liberia that is still called Schieffelin School or Schieffelin Camp today.

== Death ==
Schieffelin died in Alexandria, Egypt, while visiting his daughter Frances Kendall Schieffelin and his son-in-law Ernest Howard Crosby, who was appointed a Judge on the Mixed Tribunals in Alexandria by President Harrison.
