= Samuel Schieffelin =

American businessman (1811–1900)

Samuel Bradhurst Schieffelin
- Born: February 24, 1811
- Died: September 13, 1900 (aged 89)
- Spouse: Lucretia Hazard (m. 1835; died 1899)
- Children: 3

Samuel Bradhurst Schieffelin (February 24, 1811 – September 13, 1900), was an American businessman and author.

== Early life ==
Schieffelin was born on February 24, 1811, in New York City. He was the son of Henry Hamilton Schieffelin (1783–1865), named in honor of Governor Henry Hamilton for whom his father Jacob, who was a Loyalist who served as secretary for during the American Revolutionary War, and Maria Theresa Bradhurst (1786–1872), who married in 1806. Among his siblings was brother Bradhurst Schieffelin (1824–1909), who entered politics and supported the People's Party.

His paternal grandparents were Jacob Schieffelin (1757–1835) and Hannah Lawrence Schieffelin (1758–1838), she a descendant of Elizabeth Fones and Quaker religious freedom pioneer John Bowne. His maternal grandfather was Dr. Samuel Bradhurst (d. 1872) The Schieffelin family was one of the oldest families in Manhattan.

== Career ==
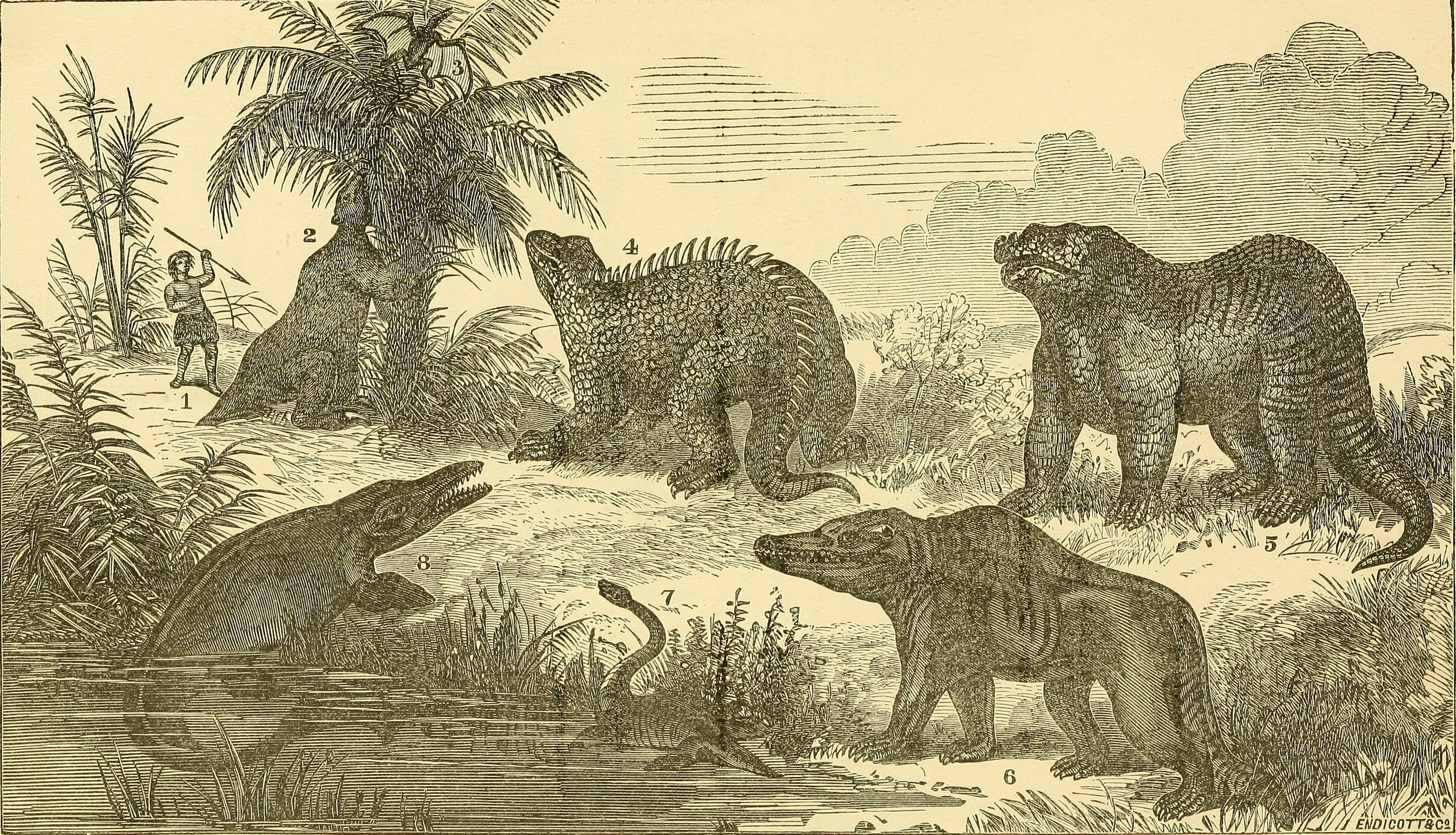
The Foundations of History (1864) by Schieffelin

He was educated in private schools, and early turned his attention to business, but contributed largely to the religious press. After his father retired from business in 1849, he and his brothers managed the family drug company that their father had founded, Schieffelin Brothers & Co., where Samuel was the president, until 1865, when his son, William, succeeded him.

Following his own retirement, he focused on his literature, writing The Foundations of History and other books, most of which were religious.

== Personal life ==
Coat of Arms of Samuel Schieffelin

In 1835, Schieffelin was married to Lucretia Hazard (1816–1899). Together, they were the parents of three children:

- William Henry Schieffelin (1836–1895), who married Mary B. Jay (1846–1916), daughter of John Jay, the U.S. Minister to Austria-Hungary, and great-granddaughter John Jay, the first Chief Justice of the United States
- Alice Holmes Schieffelin (1838–1913), who married Russell Stebbins (1835–1894).
- Mary Theresa Bradhurst Schieffelin (1840–1910), who married Brig. Gen. Charles Cleveland Dodge (1841–1910), who served in the American Civil War and was the son of Congressman William Earle Dodge.

Schieffelin died at his home, 938 Madison Avenue, on September 13, 1900, in Lenox Hill, Manhattan.

=== Descendants ===
Through his son William, he was the grandfather of Eleanor Jay Schiefflin (1864–1929), who married Theodore Munger Taft (1865–1945), and Dr. William Jay Schieffelin (1866–1955), who married Maria Louise Shepard (1870–1948), the daughter of Elliot Fitch Shepard and Margaret Louisa Vanderbilt, and granddaughter of Cornelius Vanderbilt.

Through his daughter Alice, he was the grandfather of Grace Stebbins (1860–1908), who married Alfred Clark Chapin (1848–1936), former Mayor of Brooklyn, Samuel Schieffelin Stebbins (1872–1912), a stockbroker, and Russell Hazard Schieffelin (1874–1892). The Chapin's daughter, Samuel's great-granddaughter, Grace Chapin (1885–1960), was married to Hamilton Fish III (1888–1991), member of the U.S. House of Representatives.

== Works ==
His works include:

- Message to Ruling Elders, their Office and their Duties (New York, 1859);
- The Foundations of History: a Series of First Things (1863);
- Milk for Babes: a Bible Catechism (1874);
- Children's Bread: a Bible Catechism (1874);
- Words to Christian Teachers (1877);
- Music in our Churches (1881);
- The Church in Ephesus and the Presbyterian and Reformed Churches (1884);
- People's Hymn-Book (Philadelphia, 1887).
