= John Marzluff =

American ornithologist

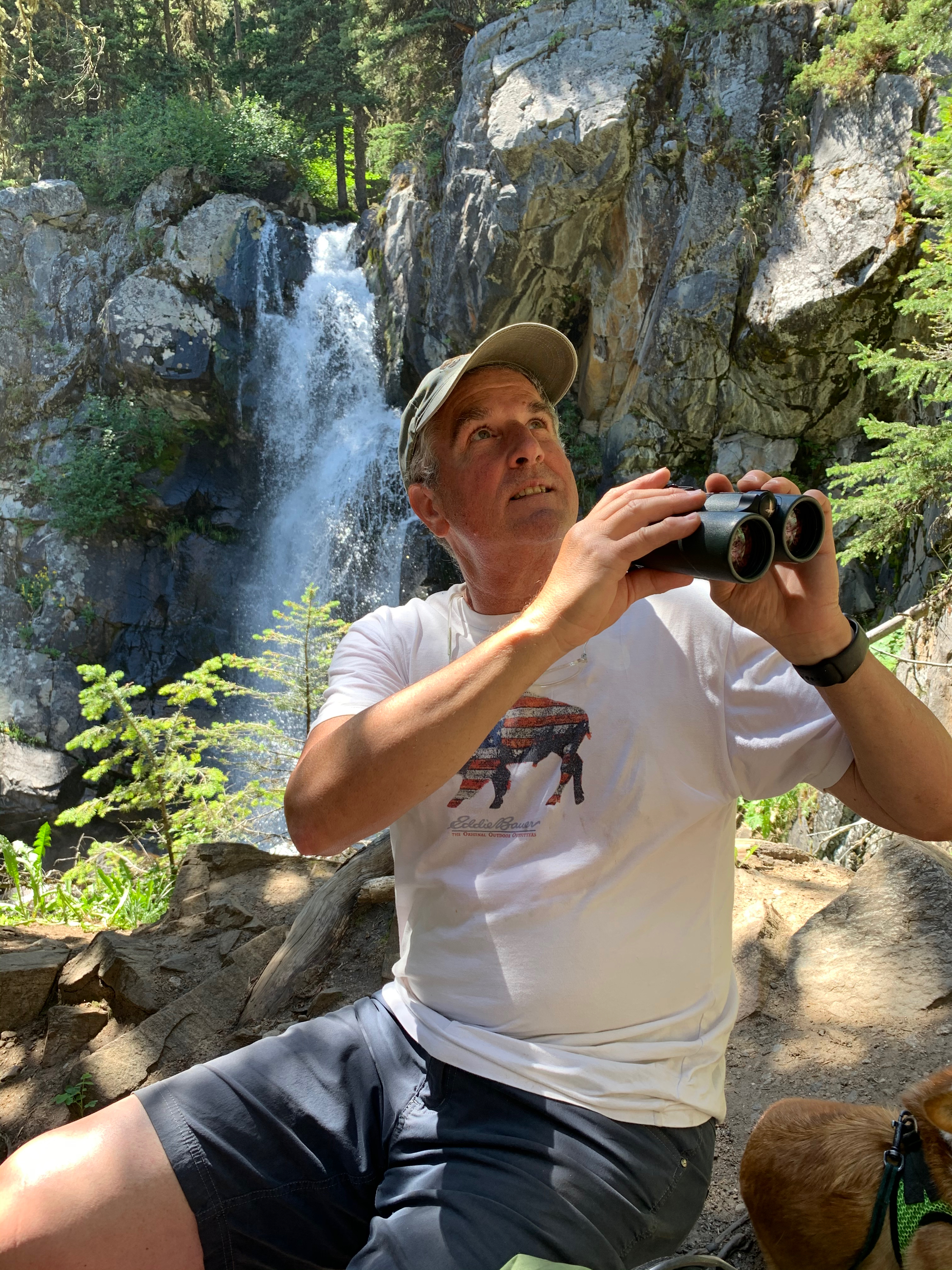
- John Marzluff (2020)
- Born: 1958 (age 67–68)
- Education: Northern Arizona University
- Scientific career
- Workplaces: University of Washington

John Marzluff (born 1958) is a professor of wildlife science at the University of Washington and an author.

In the Company of Crows and Ravens was written with and illustrated by Tony Angell. They discuss the ways that crows are like humans, and the many different ways that humans have treated crows. In Gifts of the Crow, Marzluff and Angell documented how intelligent crows are, with both anecdotes and research. In Subirdia, Marzluff shows how seven "exploiter" birds have enlarged their territories by taking advantage of human-made changes to the environment, and discusses how we could make our back yards better for birds. His work combines science, anecdotes, and humor.

His lab once banded American crows while wearing various masks, which demonstrated that crows identify and remember people's faces. After the people wearing the mask left, even crows that did not witness the tagging scolded the mask, showing an example of cultural transmission in crows. He and his fellow researchers found that this transmission was both from one generation to the next and from peer to peer. His work is featured on the PBS documentary TV show Nature in the episode "A Murder of Crows". His work with crows includes some of the first behavioral brain-imaging studies in wild birds.

In 1989, he won the H.R. Painton Award for an outstanding paper published in The Condor.
