= Bradhurst Schieffelin =

- Born: September 21, 1824; New York City, U.S.
- Died: March 9, 1909 (aged 84); Staten Island,

Bradhurst Schieffelin (21 September 1824 – 9 March 1909) was an American druggist and activist.

He was the son of Henry Hamilton Schieffelin and Maria Teresa (Bradhurst) Schieffelin, and was educated in New York City. He entered the wholesale drug manufacturing concern founded by his grandfather Jacob Schieffelin in 1794. In 1846, he became known as an advocate for equal suffrage for all males in New York. In 1860, he introduced petroleum commercially.

During the American Civil War, he organized a committee of prominent citizens for consultation with and support of President Lincoln. In the financial troubles succeeding the war, he was active in charities: he fed and sheltered thousands of destitute people at his own expense. He organized the Bread and Shelter Society for sending destitute persons from cities to rural districts for their self-support.

With Charles O'Conor and Horace Greeley, he formulated a petition introduced into the United States Congress by Roscoe Conkling for the prevention of the appropriation for the use of religious corporations of public moneys or property. He was affiliated with the People's Party, whose platform he helped to draft. He believed that no republic can exist where wealth is allowed to accumulate in the hands of a small minority, and favored a law limiting inheritance. In 1883 he was nominated by his party for state senator from the 10th district of New York City, but failed to be elected.

He died at his home, and was buried in the Moravian Cemetery in New Dorp, Staten Island, New York. He was survived by his wife, Lucy Dodge Schieffelin, originally of Montpelier, Vermont. His brother Samuel Schieffelin was an author of religious publications.
