= Henry Hamilton Schieffelin =

American businessman and lawyer (1783–1865)

- Born: June 20, 1783; Detroit, Province of Quebec, British North America
- Died: October 14, 1865 (aged 82); New York City, U.S.
- Education: Columbia College
- Occupations: Businessman; lawyer
- Spouse: Maria Theresa Bradhurst (m. 1806)
- Children: 11, including Henry, Samuel, Bradhurst, and Eugene
- Parent(s): Jacob Schieffelin; Hannah Lawrence Schieffelin

Henry Hamilton Schieffelin (June 20, 1783 – October 14, 1865) was an American businessman and lawyer.

== Early life ==
Henry Hamilton Schieffelin was the second son of Jacob Schieffelin and Hannah Lawrence Schieffelin. Schieffelin was born in Detroit and was named after Jacob’s General in the British Army.

== Personal life ==
Schieffelin married Maria Theresa Bradhurst in New York City on April 19th, 1806.

Maria Theresa was the daughter of Dr. Samuel Bradhurst. The Bradhursts and the Schieffelins were friends and neighbors in Manhattanville. The Bradhurst family owned their grand Federal style mansion Pinehurst a few miles north of the Schieffelins mansion Rooka Hall.

The couple had eleven children:

- Mary Theresa Schieffelin
- Henry Maunsell Schieffelin
- Samuel Bradhurst Schieffelin
- James Lawrence Schieffelin
- Philip Schieffelin
- Sidney Augustus Schieffelin
- Julia Schieffelin
- Washington Schieffelin
- Bradhurst Schieffelin
- Martha Schieffelin
- Eugene Schieffelin.

== Career ==
Schieffelin graduated from Columbia College in Manhattan in 1801, where he studied law with the well-known jurist Cadwallader D. Colden. Schieffelin was a practicing lawyer and ran his own lawyer’s office on 123 Pearl Street in Manhattan.

=== Schieffelin & Co ===
Schieffelin entered into his father Jacob Schieffelin's pharmaceutical business in 1805. On June 1st, 1805, Jacob sent a letter to all the employees of his company regarding the partnership with his son, and this was officially announced in a newspaper advertisement on July 3rd, 1805.

The father and son partnership dissolved through a mutual agreement in 1814; Jacob Schieffelin retired, and Henry Hamilton officially took over the management of the company. The new company was called H. H. Schieffelin & Co, a name that was in force from 1814 to 1849.

At the company, Schieffelin worked to improve the purity of pharmaceutical products and to institute ethical standards.

In 1849, Schieffelin retired and handed over the company to his four sons, Samuel, James Lawrence, Sidney Augustus and Bradhurst. Schieffelin had worked for Schieffelin for a total of 44 years and had acted as its manager for 35 of those years.

During his management the company had moved twice. First from the historic address on Pearl Street to the corner of Maiden Line and then to 104 & 106 John Street in 1841.

== Committee work ==
- Secretary of the New York Druggists Association
- Leading role in the creation of the College of Pharmacy of the City of New York
- Vice-president of the College of Pharmacy of the City of New York (1829–1830)
- President of the College of Pharmacy of the City of New York (1830-1831)

== Character and hobbies ==
Schieffelin was scientifically oriented and artistically educated. He had the reputation of being a walking encyclopedia. He was fond of animals, natural history, and fishing. He used to set his watch by making a solar observation with a sextant.
