= Jacob Schieffelin =

American loyalist, merchant, landowner and philanthropist

- Born: August 24, 1757; Philadelphia, Pennsylvania, U.S.
- Died: April 16, 1835 (aged 77); New York City, U.S.
- Occupations: loyalist; merchant; landowner; philanthropist
- Spouse: Hannah Lawrence Schieffelin
- Children: 9, including Henry Hamilton Schieffelin

Jacob Schieffelin (August 24, 1757 – April 16, 1835) was an American loyalist, merchant, landowner and philanthropist.

== Early life ==
Jacob Schieffelin was the first son of Jacob Schieffelin and Regina Margaretha Ritschauer. He was born in Philadelphia in 1757, to where his grandfather and father emigrated (his father was only 16 years old at the time of his emigration) in 1749 and 1750 from Weilheim an der Teck, Territory of the Free Imperial City of Esslingen am Neckar (in 1802–1803 becoming part of the Duchy of Württemberg).

Jacob's grandfather Johan Jacob Scheuffelin and his father Jacob Schieffelin had left Weilheim an der Teck not out of economic, political, or religious need, but from their desire for adventure and for a freer and better life, which they hoped to find in the maturing colony of America. From 1743 on, Johan Jacob Scheuffelin (1712 – 1750) sold many properties, fields, vineyards, and land in Weilheim an der Teck to fund his and his sons' emigration to America. He brought his large fortune to America to buy land.

In 1750, Jacob's grandfather died soon after arriving in Philadelphia, PA; Jacob's father was raised as an orphan in Germantown, Philadelphia. Jacob's mother had the same fate and was raised as an orphan in Germantown, too. Jacob's parents married in St. Michael's Old Zion Lutheran Church in September 1756. His father worked for the Commissariat Department of the British Army in Philadelphia. In 1760, the family was transferred to Montreal, Canada, by the British Army, where Jacob's father and three of his brothers died in 1769. Jacob's mother remarried in 1771 and, after the death of her second husband, she moved to Manhattan, New York City, but Jacob stayed in Montreal.

== Personal life ==
Jacob Schieffelin married Hannah Lawrence (1758 – 1838), a poet from a respected Manhattan Quaker family, on August 13, 1780. The couple married secretly in Manhattan, six weeks after they met. A few day later, Hannah was expelled from the Quaker Association because her wedding plans had not been approved. At the time of their wedding, Jacob was still a British officer, while the Quakers were mostly anti-British.

The couple had nine children, seven of whom reached adulthood: Edward Lawrence, Henry Hamilton, Effingham, Anna Maria, Effingham Lawrence, Jacob, John Lawrence, Cornelia, Richard Lawrence.

== Young man in Montreal and military service ==
On November 12, 1774, Jacob Schieffelin was one of the signers of the Petition to the King for Repeal of the Quebec Act of 1774, in which George III and the British government rejected the habeas corpus writ to the province of Quebec. This petition by Quebec colonists addressed the same issues as the Petition to the King by the First Continental Congress in October 1774.

When Jacob Schieffelin was eighteen years old, he started trading with the British military in Montreal in 1775. He volunteered for the British Army when a new military unit was formed to fight against the American colonists who had invaded Canada. On September 25, 1775, he had his first mission during the American Revolutionary War, when the colonists under the command of Ethan Allen attacked Montreal.

In 1776 he made his way to trade goods with the British fort and frontier settlement of Detroit. Jacob Schieffelin took ill and had a high fever. During his illness he was visited by the governor Henry Hamilton (1734–1796). Hamilton took care of Jacob, giving him medicine and treating him like his own son. When Jacob was well again, Hamilton suggested that he should accompany him on his military actions. Jacob agreed. On August 16, 1777, Henry Hamilton, and Jacob Schieffelin took part in the Battle of Bennington, VT. On October 7, 1778, they launched an expedition against Illinois. On February 24, 1779, the British had to surrender to Clark's troops in Vincennes. Jacob Schieffelin, as a British officer, was taken hostage by the Americans. Jacob had been a prisoner in Williamsburg, VA, until spring 1780. Jacob Schieffelin and his friend, the French officer Philippe Rocheblave escaped from prison on April 19, 1780. The two men pass unharmed through American controlled territory. When they arrived at Chesapeake Bay, a ship took them to New York City. On July 9, 1780, Jacob Schieffelin and Philippe Rocheblave reached Manhattan. The two were well received in the British-controlled city. Jacob immediately contacted General Henry Clinton, the commander of the British Army in America.

== Young man in Manhattan and wedding ==
General Clinton billeted Jacob Schieffelin with the Lawrence family. On July 9, 1780, Hannah Lawrence and Jacob Schieffelin met for the first time in the large house of the Lawrence family on Queen Street, today Pearl Street, in Manhattan. Hannah Lawrence, considered a local beauty, was a young poet, who participated in a writing society. She had long, auburn hair, and a distinct character, with steadfast views and energetic spirit. Hannah came from a respected and proud Quaker family, who had arrived in the New World already in the 17th century and had settled on Long Island. Hannah's father, John Lawrence, was a successful merchant in Flushing on Long Island. One year earlier, in 1779, Hannah had used her poetic talent to protest the British, in particular the unsavory behavior of British soldiers on Broadway in front of the Trinity Church.

On August 13, 1780, six weeks after they met, Hannah and Jacob married secretly.

A few months after their wedding, Hannah and Jacob planned to leave for Detroit. Jacob Schieffelin received correspondence from General Frederick Haldimand, Governor of the Quebec Province in British service.

== Young family in Detroit and Montreal ==
On September 15, 1780, the young couple boarded a small sailing ship leaving Manhattan. They arrived in Quebec on October 17, 1780, where Jacob received his salary for his military service between 1778 and 1780. Hannah and Jacob sailed on to Montreal and then through Lake Ontario to Fort Niagara. They arrived in Detroit on April 24, 1781, where Jacob returned to his position as Secretary of the British Government and bought a piece of land to build a home for his family. On September 13, 1781, the first child of Hannah and Jacob was born in Detroit, the son Edward Lawrence Schieffelin. Another son, Henry Hamilton Schieffelin, followed on June 20, 1783. Further children followed, who were born in Manhattan and Montreal.

Jacob started buying land in present-day Canada. So, he began to realize his grandfather's dream of buying land in America on a large scale.

After the end of the American War of Independence, the British Army was ordered back from the provinces on June 24, 1784. Hannah and Jacob decided to return to Montreal. Jacob was appointed “Public Auctioneer of the City and District of Montreal”, giving him the right to buy any land, real estate, goods, and items that could be useful to Montreal.

In 1794, Jacob bought land in the US for the first time, a plot of land in New York State.

Since the late 1780s, Hannah and Jacob traveled to Manhattan several times to meet their parents and relatives.

On October 25, 1789, Jacob traveled to London. He lobbied for the loyal Canadian veterans of the British Army and wanted compensation for his military service in Canada from the British government in London. In London he also started business activities.

In London, Jacob met Effingham Lawrence, his father-in-law's brother. Effingham Lawrence had moved to London and founded a pharmaceutical wholesale business to supply hospitals and pharmacies. Effingham Lawrence was the uncle of the Effingham Lawrence in Manhattan, who was also active in the pharmaceutical business and whose business Jacob would come to take over.

== Founding Lawrence & Schieffelin in Manhattan ==
In the spring of 1794, Hannah, Jacob, and their children returned to Manhattan. Jacob, together with his brother-in-law John Burling Lawrence, took over the pharmaceutical business from Effingham Lawrence. In 1794 they founded the trading company Lawrence & Schieffelin, Pharma-Trade, at 195 Pearl Street. The shop was located opposite the Fly Market, next to the corner house of the Maiden Line, in an old Dutch house dating from 1626.

In 1794, Tontine Coffee House opened on the corner of Wall Street and Water Street in Manhattan. This coffee house was the beginning of the New York Stock Exchange. Jacob often visited Tontine to buy goods for his shop.

In 1794, Jacob joined the German Society as a member and was appointed Director of the Washington Assurance Society in 1802.

The success of Lawrence & Schieffelin led Jacob to expand the business beyond pharmaceutical goods. The New York port was better suited to large ships than the port in Philadelphia, allowing for a greater turnover of goods. Jacob expanded the business to include international trade, buying several warehouses in New York City where he stored the imported goods. Jacob had already started to enter international shipping in 1795. His partner, John Lawrence, did not support Jacob's business expansion. John Lawrence withdrew from the partnership with Jacob in 1799 and opened a new store a few blocks away on 199 Pearl Street. Jacob paid out John's shares in the company and took over the warehouse. He continued to run the Drugs & Medicines store at 195 Pearl Street. The company was renamed to Jacob Schieffelin and existed from 1799 to 1805.

In 1804, Jacob published the “Catalog of Drugs, Medicines & Chemicals sold Wholesale & Retail.” The catalog was checked and approved in 1806 by the New York Druggists Association and its then Secretary Henry Hamilton Schieffelin.

In 1805, Jacob took his son Henry Hamilton Schieffelin into the company's management and renamed the company Jacob Schieffelin & Son, which existed from 1805 to 1814.

In 1811, the New York City Council presented a grand plan for the development of Manhattan. Roads were planned up to 155th Street. Jacob Schieffelin advocated keeping Broadway's diagonal course.

In 1814, Jacob Schieffelin retired, and his son Henry Hamilton Schieffelin officially took over the management of the company. The new company was called H. H. Schieffelin & Co, a name that was in force from 1814 to 1849. Jacob Schieffelin exclusively focused on real estate.

== Real estate, Manhattanville, and the Hamiltons ==
Real estate seems to have been Jacob's favorite business.

In 1795, Jacob Schieffelin took the profit of 25,000 dollars from a shipload of cargo to buy land on a hill above the Hudson River in the north of Manhattan. The property was located at Harlem Cove, a small bay of the Hudson. The area later became Manhattanville, and the first streets were called Schieffelin Street, Lawrence Street, Effingham Street, Hamilton Street and Manhattan Street. The new town of Manhattanville was to receive a church, a school, a harbor, residential buildings, and commercial space.

In 1800, Hannah and Jacob Schieffelin built their country estate, Rooka Hall, in Manhattanville.

In 1800, Jacob Schieffelin sold half of his property to his friend Alexander Hamilton. Alexander Hamilton acquired a right-angled, 15-acre plot of land at a reasonable price. Hamilton built his country house there, which he called Hamilton Grange, named after the country estate of his ancestors in Scotland and the house of his uncle in St. Croix on the Virgin Islands. The Hamiltons and the Schieffelins became neighbor and friends in Manhattanville. The Schieffelins worshiped with Elizabeth Schuyler Hamilton, the widow of Alexander Hamilton after his death in 1804.

== St. Mary's Protestant Episcopal Church ==
In 1823, Hannah and Jacob Schieffelin donated money and a plot of land in Manhattanville for the construction of St. Mary's church. St. Mary's was built between 1824 and 1826 and was inaugurated on Thanksgiving Day. St. Mary's in Manhattanville was the first free-pew church in New York City. St. Mary's church contains the burial vault "Jacob Schieffelin's Vault“.

== Death ==
Jacob Schieffelin died of a stroke on April 16, 1835. He left Hannah Lawrence Schieffelin and his children a huge fortune. Jacob Schieffelin was buried in St. Mary's church in Manhattanville, like his wife Hannah Lawrence Schieffelin.
