= Edith Isaacs =

American theatre critic (1878–1956)

- Born: Edith Juliet Rich; March 27, 1878
- Died: January 10, 1956 (aged 77)
- Occupations: Writer, theatre critic
- Relatives: Stanley M. Isaacs (brother-in-law} Edith Somborn Isaacs (sister-in-law)

Edith Juliet Rich Isaacs (March 27, 1878 - January 10, 1956) ) was an American theatre critic and arts editor.

== Biography ==
A native of Milwaukee, Isaacs was the daughter of Adolph Walter and Rosa Sidenberg Rich, and was the third daughter in a family of six children; she had four sisters and one brother. Her father was born in Hungary and came to the United States under the auspices of Carl Schurz, while her mother was from a family with roots in Breslau. She studied at Downer College before taking a position with the Milwaukee Sentinel, for whose literary section she wrote until 1904. She then moved to New York City to freelance, and in 1913 became drama critic for Ainslee's Magazine. In 1918 she joined the staff of Theatre Arts; from 1922 until 1946 she served as its editor, significantly raising its profile and turning it into a monthly publication, instead of a quarterly one. Active in the promotion of American theatre, from 1935 until 1939 she was involved with the Federal Theatre Project; she worked with other organizations as well during her career.

She was succeeded at the helm of Theatre Arts by Rosamund Gilder.

In 1904, Isaacs married lawyer and composer Lewis Montefiore Isaacs, with whom she had collaborated on an operetta for children. The couple were the parents of three, and lived happily until his death in 1944. Eventually bedridden due to arthritis, Edith Isaacs was forced to move into a nursing home in White Plains in 1951. Visitors in her later years included Martha Graham, who helped her to develop movements and other techniques to alleviate her suffering. She died in White Plains after a stroke. In 1958 a Theatre Arts Project for East Harlem was established in her memory.

== Selected works ==
Books which she wrote or edited included:

- Theatre: Essays on the Arts of the Theatre (1927)
- Plays of American Life and Fantasy (1929)
- The Negro in the American Theatre (1947)
