= Edith Somborn Isaacs =

American writer (1884–1978)

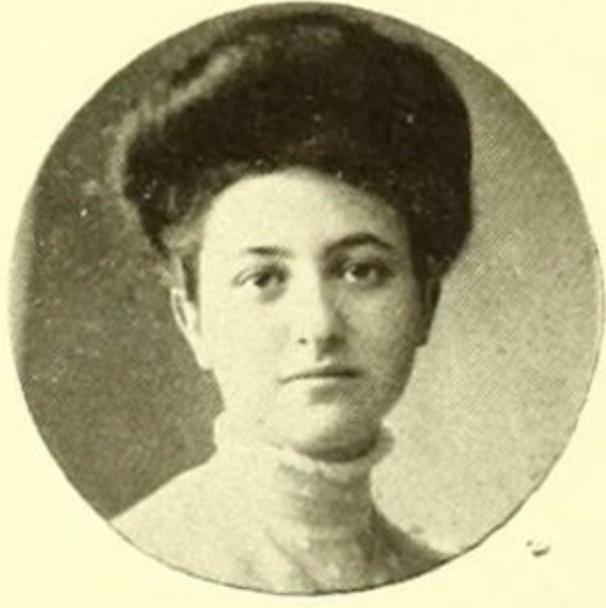
- Edith Somborn, later Isaacs, from the 1906 yearbook of Barnard College
- Born: June 18, 1884; New York, New York, U.S.
- Died: May 7, 1978 (aged 93); New York, New York, U.S.
- Occupations: Playwright, civic leader, clubwoman
- Spouse: Stanley M. Isaacs
- Relatives: Myer S. Isaacs (father-in-law); Edith Isaacs (sister-in-law)

Edith Somborn Isaacs (June 18, 1884 – May 7, 1978) was an American playwright, civic leader, and clubwoman, based in New York City. She was president of the Women's City Club of New York, and campaign manager and biographer of her husband, Manhattan Borough President, Stanley M. Isaacs. She wrote several plays.

== Early life and education ==
Somborn was born in New York City, the daughter of Julius Somborn and Helen Stirn Somborn. Her father and her maternal grandparents were born in Germany. Her father was a wine merchant. She graduated from Barnard College in 1906. At Barnard, she was associate editor of the Barnard Bulletin. She and classmate Blanche Hays Fagen co-wrote and produced an operetta, Barnardesia, as a fundraiser for a new dormitory on campus. They raised "more than $2000" in two performances.

== Career ==
Isaacs ran her husband Stanley M. Isaacs' political campaigns when he served as Manhattan Borough President and served on the City Council. As campaign manager, she wrote jingles, organized volunteers, and maintained campaign correspondence.

Isaacs chaired the Barnard College Alumnae Association fundraising campaign in 1954. She was president of the Women's City Club of New York, a trustee of the Bank Street College of Education, and active in the Phi Beta Kappa Alumnae Association. She served on the executive committee of Goodwill Industries for many years. In 1962 she accepted a distinguished service medal from the Theodore Roosevelt Association, on behalf of her late husband.

== Works ==
Isaacs wrote a biography of her husband, and sketches that were performed on Broadway and elsewhere. She was a member of the Writers Club of Columbia University.

- Her House in Order (1923, a three-act comedy)
- Escape (1926, a three-act play, co-written with Rose Constance Albert)
- Release (1928, a three-act play, co-written with Rose Constance Albert)
- "Education of Handicapped" (1947, letter to editor, The New York Times)
- Love Affair with a City: The Story of Stanley M. Isaacs (1967)

== Personal life and legacy ==
Somborn married Stanley M. Isaacs in 1910. They had two children, Myron and Helen (Casey). Her husband died in 1962, and she died in 1978, at the age of 93, in New York City. Barnard College Archives has a scrapbook made by Edith Somborn while she was in college.

The American theatre critic and editor Edith Isaacs was married to Stanley M. Isaacs' brother Lewis.
