= Ainslee's Magazine =

American literary periodical from 1897 to 1926

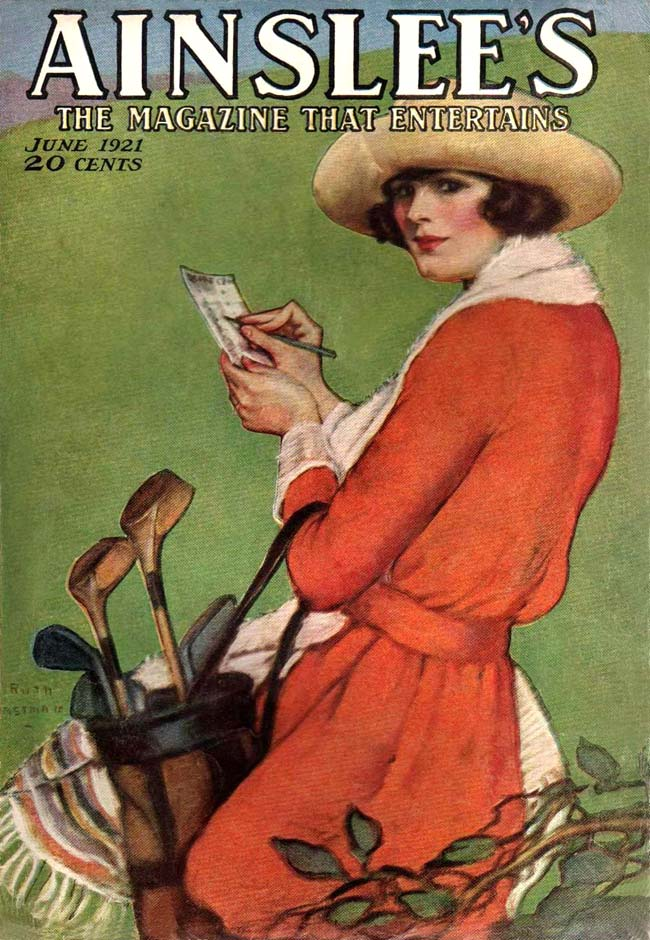
- June 1921 cover
- Categories: Literary magazine
- Frequency: Monthly
- Publisher: Ainslee magazine Co.
- First issue: 1897
- Final issue: December 1926
- Country: United States
- Based in: New York City
- Language: English
- OCLC: 1478612

Ainslee's Magazine was an American literary periodical published from 1897 to December 1926. It was originally published as a humor magazine called The Yellow Kid, based on the popular comic strip character. It was renamed Ainslee's the following year.

The magazine's publishers were Howard, Ainslee & Co., a division of the Street & Smith publishing house in New York City.

== Contributors ==
Among those who contributed essays, short stories, or poetry to Ainslee's:

- Stephen Crane
- Arthur Conan Doyle
- Theodore Dreiser
- Frances Gaither
- Maud Hart Lovelace
- Bret Harte
- O. Henry
- Anthony Hope
- Jack London
- Edna St. Vincent Millay
- E. Phillips Oppenheim
- Constance Lindsay Skinner
- Albert Payson Terhune
- Stanley J. Weyman
- P. G. Wodehouse
- I. A. R. Wylie

From 1920 to 1923 Dorothy Parker wrote the monthly drama reviews column, "In Broadway Playhouses". Edith Isaacs worked as a critic for the magazine prior to her tenure at Theatre Arts.

Ainslee's was published until December 1926, after which it was merged into Far West Illustrated, a western-fiction magazine.

In 1934, Street & Smith revived Ainslee's Magazine as a "sophisticated love-story monthly" edited by Daisy Bacon. In 1936, the title changed to Ainslee’s Smart Love Stories, then finally Smart Love Stories. It was discontinued in 1938.

== Publication details ==
Ainslee's switched from a 10¢ cover price to 15¢ with the October 1902 issue, allegedly the first magazine with a 15¢ price.

The magazine switched from slick to pulp paper with the February 1914 issue (it had slick ad sections front and back throughout).
