= Stanley M. Isaacs =

American politician (1882–1962)

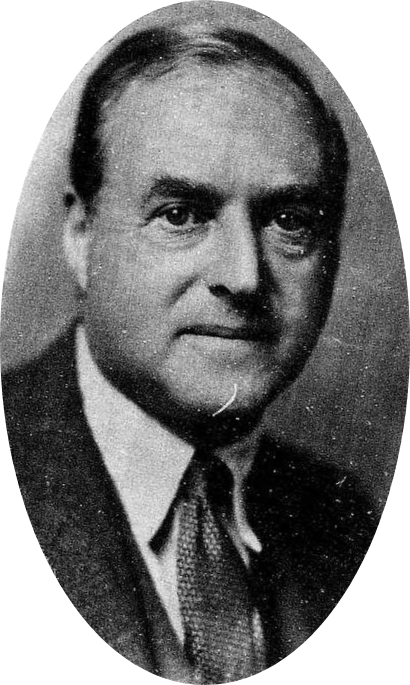
- Isaacs, c. 1937

13th Borough President of Manhattan
- In office January 1, 1938 – December 31, 1941
- Preceded by: Samuel Levy
- Succeeded by: Edgar J. Nathan

Minority Leader of the New York City Council
- In office January 4, 1950 – July 12, 1962
- President: Vincent R. Impellitteri; Joseph T. Sharkey (acting); Rudolph Halley; Abe Stark; Paul R. Screvane
- Preceded by: Genevieve Earle
- Succeeded by: Angelo J. Arculeo

Member of the New York City Council
- In office January 1, 1942 – July 12, 1962
- Preceded by: Joseph Clark Baldwin
- Succeeded by: Theodore R. Kupferman
- Constituency: Manhattan At-Large (1942–1949); 20th district (1950–1962)

Personal details
- Born: September 27, 1882 New York City, U.S.
- Died: July 12, 1962 (aged 79) New York City, U.S.
- Party: Republican
- Other political affiliations: City Fusion (1941)
- Spouse: Edith Somborn Isaacs
- Relations: Samuel Myer Isaacs (grandfather)
- Parent: Myer S. Isaacs (father)
- Education: Columbia College; New York Law School

Stanley Myer Isaacs (September 27, 1882 – July 12, 1962) was an American politician from New York City. A Republican, he served as Manhattan Borough President from 1938 to 1941 and later as a member of the New York City Council from 1942 to 1962. He was Minority Leader of the council from 1950 to 1962. An advocate for social justice, Isaacs is perhaps best known for his support for housing and the work he did with Mayor Fiorello LaGuardia, whom he helped to get elected.

Isaacs is played a role in exposing the shady financial arrangements between park commissioner Robert Moses and the restaurant Tavern in the Park's owner Arnold Schleifer during the "Battle for Central Park", in April 1956. This exposure would lead to further questioning of Moses, and eventually to the fall of the system of political patronage he led in the city.

== Biography ==
A graduate of both Columbia College and New York Law School, Isaacs was born in Manhattan to a family of English-Jewish descent. His paternal grandfather, Samuel Myer Isaacs, was rabbi at Temple Shaaray Tefila. His father, Myer S. Isaacs, along with his grandfather, published The Jewish Messenger.

Shortly before taking office as borough president, Isaacs sparked considerable controversy when he appointed Si Gerson, an open member of the Communist Party, his confidential examiner (also known as assistant), making him the first Communist to hold any appointed office in New York City. Although Isaacs defended his decision as being made on merit rather than political ideology, Gerson was nonetheless forced to resign in September 1940; facing a legal challenge from the American Legion on his right to hold office, Gerson could not afford a legal team and the City Corporation Counsel refused to take his case. This controversy later led to county Republicans refusing to renominate Isaacs in 1941, to which he retaliated by running for city council successfully as a City Fusionist.

Isaacs died on July 12, 1962, aged 79, at his home in Manhattan, from a heart attack.

Political offices
| Preceded by Genevieve Earle | Minority Leader, New York City Council; 1950–1962 | Succeeded by Angelo J. Arculeo |
| Preceded by District created | New York City Council, 20th district 1950–1962 | Succeeded by Theodore R. Kupferman |
| Preceded by Joseph Clark Baldwin | New York City Council, Manhattan at-large district 1942–1950 | Succeeded by District abolished |
| Preceded by Samuel Levy | Borough President of Manhattan; 1938–1941 | Succeeded by Edgar J. Nathan |
