= Lora Hays =

- Born: November 1, 1910
- Died: November 28, 2009 (age 99)
- Occupations: Film editor, theatre professional, college professor
- Spouse: Jean Lenauer
- Parent(s): Arthur Garfield Hays; Blanche Hays Fagen
- Relatives: Rita Weiman (aunt)

Lora Hays (Spindell) (November 1, 1910 – November 28, 2009) was an American film editor, primarily television shows and documentary films, including the Academy Award-winning film Harlan County, USA (1976).

== Early life and education ==
Hays' father was Arthur Garfield Hays, founder of the American Civil Liberties Union, and her mother was actress and activist Blanche Hays Fagen. Her maternal uncle Maurice Marks married screenwriter Rita Weiman. Her parents divorced in 1924, and both remarried. Hays spent some of her youth at a Swiss boarding school, where she made a lifelong friend in Kitty Carlisle. She studied theatre at Carnegie Technical Institute.

== Career ==
Hays began her career with training in the theater, making her debut in Little Accident (1929) and going on to appear in films in Paris.

In 1933 she became a film producer, sponsoring "Datelines", a humorous commentary on the news in which actors re-enact human interest stories from the news headlines. She also served as assistant producer on "Used Cars", the 1939 item in the "Getting Your Money's Worth" series of consumer education films.

Hays first worked as an assistant editor to the film director Joris Ivens, learning her trade at the side of Helena von Dongen on Ivens' film Power and the Land (1940). She is credited with editing two short spinoff films under Ivens’ long-distance supervision in 1941 after he had moved on to his next project, Bip Goes to Town and Worst of Farm Disasters.

In 1962, she shared with colleagues an Emmy nomination for Outstanding Achievement in Film Editing in television for the CBS Show "20th Century." The documentary King: A Filmed Record. . .Montgomery to Memphis (1970), which she co-edited with pioneering African-American film editor John Carter, received an Oscar nomination for best documentary feature in 1970; the documentary was entered into the National Film Registry in 1999.

In her later years, Hays taught film editing at the New York University Tisch School of the Arts.

== Filmography ==
- Little Accident (1929), actress
- L'Affair est dans le sac (1932), actress, directed by Jacques Prevert
- Datelines (1938), producer, directed by Julian Hoffmann
- Power and the Land (1940), assistant editor
- Bip Goes to Town
- Worst of Farm Disasters
- King: A Filmed Record. . .Montgomery to Memphis (1970), supervising editor
- Harlan County, USA (1976)

== Personal life ==
Hays married Austrian filmmaker Jean Lenauer. After their divorce, she married physical educator Lou Spindell. She survived a stroke in 2007, and she died in 2009, a few weeks after her 99th birthday.
