= Blanche Hays Fagen =

American actress

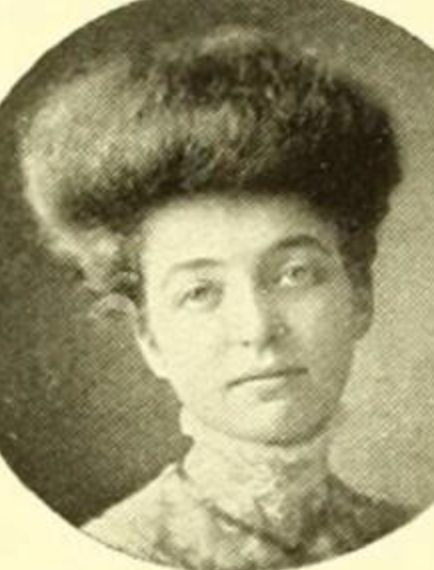
- Blanche Hays, from the 1906 yearbook of Barnard College
- Born: Blanche Florence Marks; December 12, 1884; New York, U.S.
- Died: April 1980 (aged 95); Fort Pierce, Florida, U.S.
- Other name: Blanche Hays
- Occupations: Actress, activist, writer, businesswoman
- Spouse(s): Arthur Garfield Hays; William H. Fagen
- Children: 1, Lora Hays
- Relatives: Rita Weiman (sister-in-law); Jean Lenauer (son-in-law)

Blanche Florence Marks Hays Fagen (December 12, 1884 – April 1980) was an American actress, civil rights activist, journalist, and businesswoman. She was a member of the Provincetown Players.

== Early life and education ==
Hays was born in New York City, the daughter of Samuel A. Marks and Frances E. Marks. She had an older brother, Maurice Marks, who became a playwright and married a screenwriter, Rita Weiman. She graduated from Hunter College High School in 1899. She graduated from Barnard College in 1906. At Barnard she acted in student theatre productions, and co-wrote and produced an operetta, Barnadesia, with classmate Edith Somborn Isaacs, as a fundraiser for a new dormitory.

== Career ==
In October 1920 Hays and two socialist activists tried to hold a street meeting in Mount Vernon, but they were denied a permit. They held the meeting anyway and were arrested. The charges were dismissed, but they challenged the process by which their permit was denied. They took the case to the New York Supreme Court, before losing in the appeals court in 1921.

Hays was a member of the Provincetown Players. She appeared in their New York productions of plays by Susan Glaspell, including Tickless Time in 1920, and Inheritors and The Verge in 1921, in casts with Margaret Wycherly, Ann Harding, James Light, Norma Millay, and Henry O'Neill. She also performed in Savitri, or Love Conquers Death by Kedar Nath Das Gupta, at Cooper Union in 1921. She acted in another Provincetown Players show in 1922.

Before she divorced her first husband in 1924, she moved to Paris, where she was a close friend to Elsa Schiaparelli and was a correspondent for several American publications, including Harper's Bazaar. She studied art in Mexico in the studio of Diego Rivera and Frida Kahlo in 1941. During World War II she returned to the United States, and worked in a government censorship office.

She moved to Florida with her second husband after the war, and they ran a smoked fish business together until they retired in 1961. She ran an art gallery in Fort Pierce in the 1970s. The Fort Pierce Arts League celebrated her 95th birthday in 1979, a few months before she died.

== Personal life and legacy ==
Marks married civil rights lawyer Arthur Garfield Hays in 1908. They had a daughter, film editor Lora Hays Spindell. She divorced Hays in 1924. She remarried to William Hope Fagen and lived with him in Florida. Her second husband died in 1968, and Fagen died in 1980, at the age of 95. She gave an interview for Warren Beatty in 1979, and was one of the "Witnesses" who appeared posthumously in his film Reds (1981).
