= Andrew R. Armstrong =

American labor leader and politician

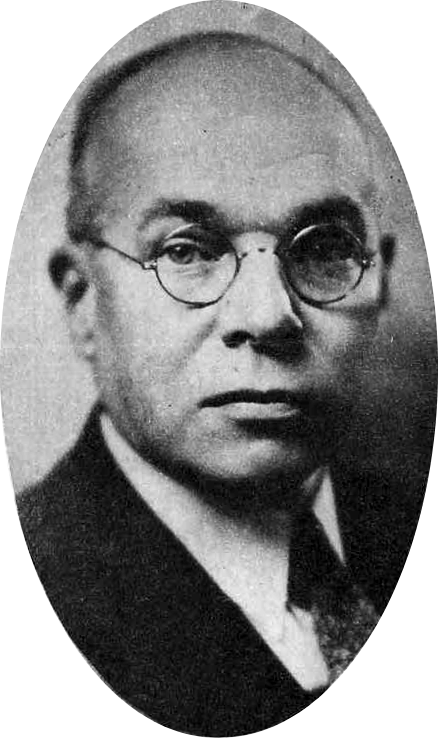
- Armstrong c. 1937

Minority Leader of the New York City Council
- In office December 5, 1938 – December 22, 1939
- President: Newbold Morris
- Preceded by: Baruch Charney Vladeck
- Succeeded by: Genevieve Earle

Member of the New York City Council from Brooklyn At-Large
- In office January 1, 1938 – December 31, 1939
- Preceded by: Constituency established
- Succeeded by: Multi-member district

Personal details
- Born: December 20, 1885
- Died: December 10, 1968 (aged 82) Dover, New Jersey, U.S.
- Party: American Labor
- Occupation: Labor leader, politician

Andrew R. Armstrong (December 20, 1885 – December 10, 1968) was an American labor leader and politician who served on the New York City Council from 1938 to 1939. He also served as minority leader of that body for the second half of his tenure, succeeding the late Baruch Charney Vladeck.

Armstrong was previously a labor leader, serving as president of the New York Pressmens Union for 14 years. He joined the American Labor Party after its formation in 1936, serving as state treasurer of the party.

Armstrong died on December 10, 1968, in Dover, New Jersey.
