= Theodore R. Kupferman =

American politician

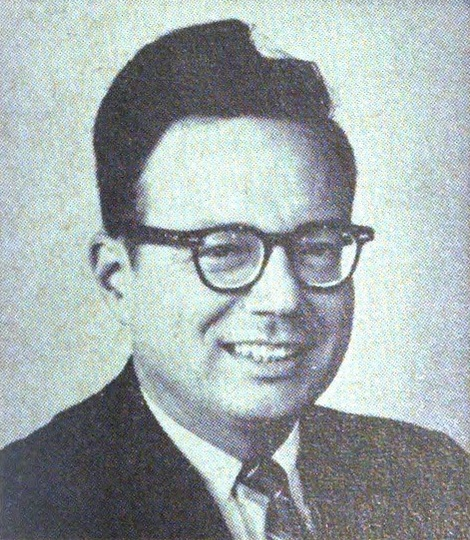
- Theodore R. Kupferman from the Pocket Congressional Directory of the Ninetieth Congress, published in 1967.

Associate Justice of the New York Supreme Court, Appellate Division, First Department
- In office 1969–1996
- Appointed by: Nelson Rockefeller

Member of the U.S. House of Representatives from New York's 17th district
- In office February 8, 1966 – January 3, 1969
- Preceded by: John Lindsay
- Succeeded by: Ed Koch

Member of the New York City Council
- In office 1962–1966
- Preceded by: Stanley M. Isaacs
- Succeeded by: Woodward Kingman
- Constituency: 20th district (1962–1965); 2nd district (1966)

Personal details
- Born: Theodore Roosevelt Kupferman; May 12, 1920 New York City, U.S.
- Died: September 23, 2003 (aged 83) New York City, U.S.
- Resting place: Kensico Cemetery, Valhalla, New York
- Party: Republican
- Spouse: Frederike Hering (m. Dec. 21, 1957)
- Children: Michael Delgado
- Education: DeWitt Clinton High School (1937)
- Alma mater: City College of New York (1940); Columbia Law School (1943)
- Profession: Lawyer; Politician; Judge

Theodore Roosevelt Kupferman (May 12, 1920 – September 23, 2003) was an American politician who was a Republican member of the United States House of Representatives from New York and a judge of the New York Supreme Court.

== Biography ==
Kupferman was born in The Bronx, New York City. He graduated from DeWitt Clinton High School (1937), City College of New York (1940), and Columbia Law School (1943).

He was a member of the legal department of Warner Bros. Pictures from 1943 until 1948 and from 1949 until 1951. He was a member of NBC's legal department from 1951 until 1953. He served as president of the City Club of New York from 1956 to 1958. He was a counsel and legislative assistant to Stanley M. Isaacs, the New York City Council minority leader, from 1958 to 1962, during which time he wrote The Family Legal Advisor (Greystone, 1957); it was later republished by Ace Books. Kupferman was an assistant and adjunct professor of law at New York Law School from 1959 until 1964.

He was a member of the New York City Council from 1962 until 1966. Kupferman was elected to Congress in 1966, defeating Orin Lehman to fill the vacancy caused when John V. Lindsay resigned to become Mayor of New York City. He was elected to a full term in November 1966 and served from February 8, 1966, to January 3, 1969. In September 1966 Kupferman, citing articles and books critical of the Warren Commission which investigated the assassination of John F. Kennedy, proposed a 10-member joint Senate-House committee to review the Warren Commission's work and conclusions, but the proposal was not acted on.

In 1969 Kupferman became a justice of the New York Supreme Court, and he served until 1996. After retiring from the bench he returned to practicing law, and represented clients including Abraham Hirschfeld and the Patrolmen's Benevolent Association of the City of New York.

Kupferman died in New York City on September 23, 2003. He was interred at Kensico Cemetery in Valhalla, New York.

== Sources ==
- United States Congress. "Theodore R. Kupferman (id: K000343)". Biographical Directory of the United States Congress.

New York City Council
Preceded by Stanley M. Isaacs	Member of the New York City Council from the 20th district 1962–1965	Succeeded by Thomas J. Cuite
Preceded by District established	Member of the New York City Council from the 2nd district 1966	Succeeded by Woodward Kingman
U.S. House of Representatives
Preceded by John Lindsay	Member of the U.S. House of Representatives from New York's 17th congressional district 1966–1969	Succeeded by Ed Koch
