= John Lindsay =

American politician (1921–2000)

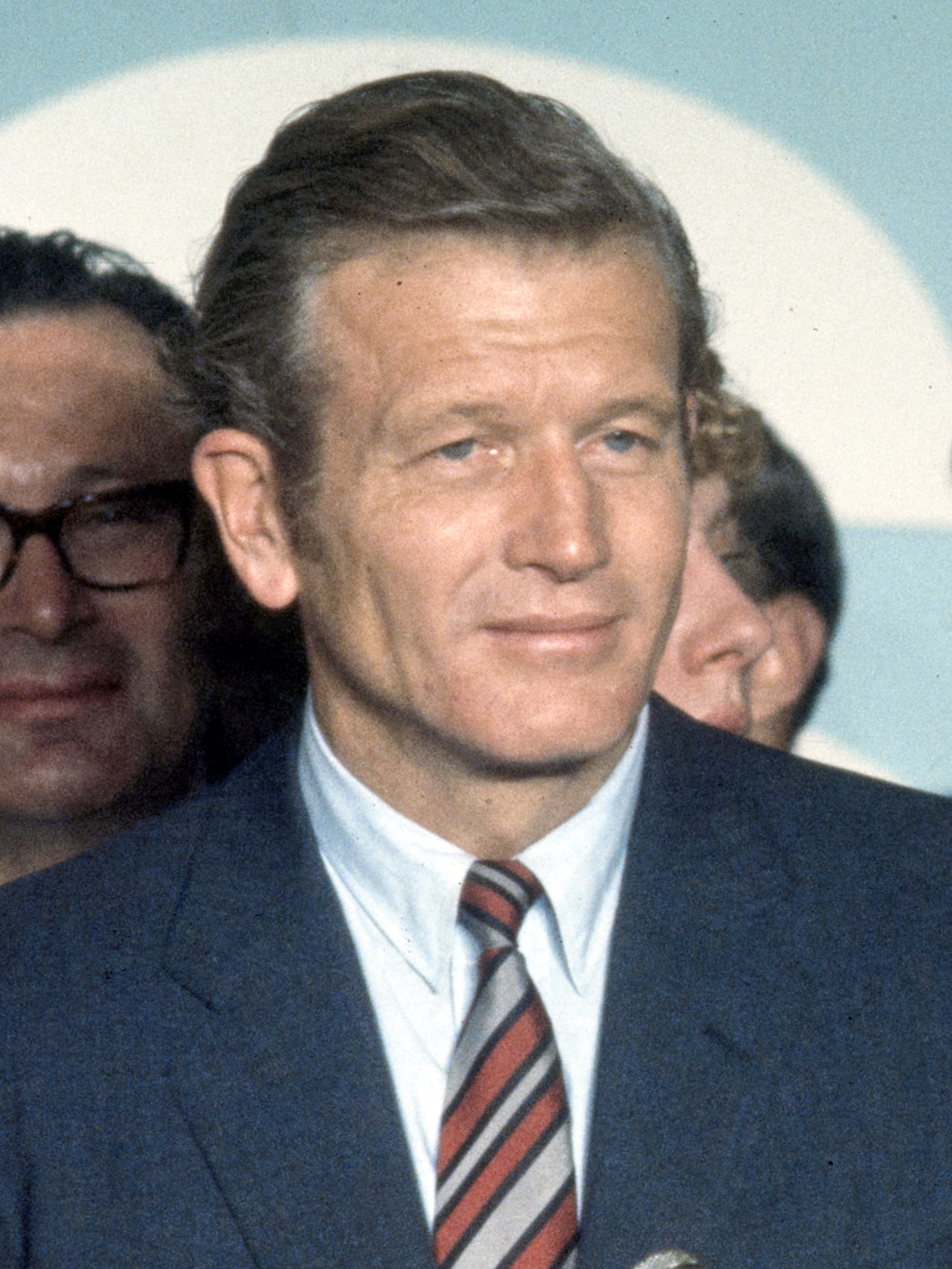
- Lindsay, c. 1969

104th Mayor of New York City
- In office January 1, 1966 – December 31, 1973
- Preceded by: Robert F. Wagner Jr.
- Succeeded by: Abraham Beame

Member of the U.S. House of Representatives from New York's 17th district
- In office January 3, 1959 – December 31, 1965
- Preceded by: Frederic Coudert
- Succeeded by: Theodore R. Kupferman

Personal details
- Born: John Vliet Lindsay; November 24, 1921 New York City, U.S.
- Died: December 19, 2000 (aged 79) Hilton Head Island, South Carolina, U.S.
- Party: Republican (before 1971); Democratic (1971–2000)
- Other political affiliations: Liberal
- Spouse: Mary Harrison (m. 1949)
- Education: Yale University (BA, LLB)

Military service
- Allegiance: United States
- Branch/service: United States Navy
- Years of service: 1943–1946
- Rank: Lieutenant
- Battles/wars: World War II; Allied invasion of Sicily; Pacific Theater

John Vliet Lindsay (/vliːt/; November 24, 1921 – December 19, 2000) was an American politician and lawyer. During his political career, Lindsay was a U.S. congressman, the mayor of New York City, and a candidate for U.S. president. He was also a regular guest host of Good Morning America. Lindsay served as a member of the U.S. House of Representatives from January 1959 to December 1965 and as mayor of New York from January 1966 to December 1973.

In 1971, during his second term as mayor, Lindsay switched from the Republican to the Democratic Party. That same year, he launched a brief and unsuccessful bid for the 1972 Democratic presidential nomination. He made an unsuccessful bid for the Democratic nomination in the 1980 U.S. Senate election in New York.

== Early life and career ==
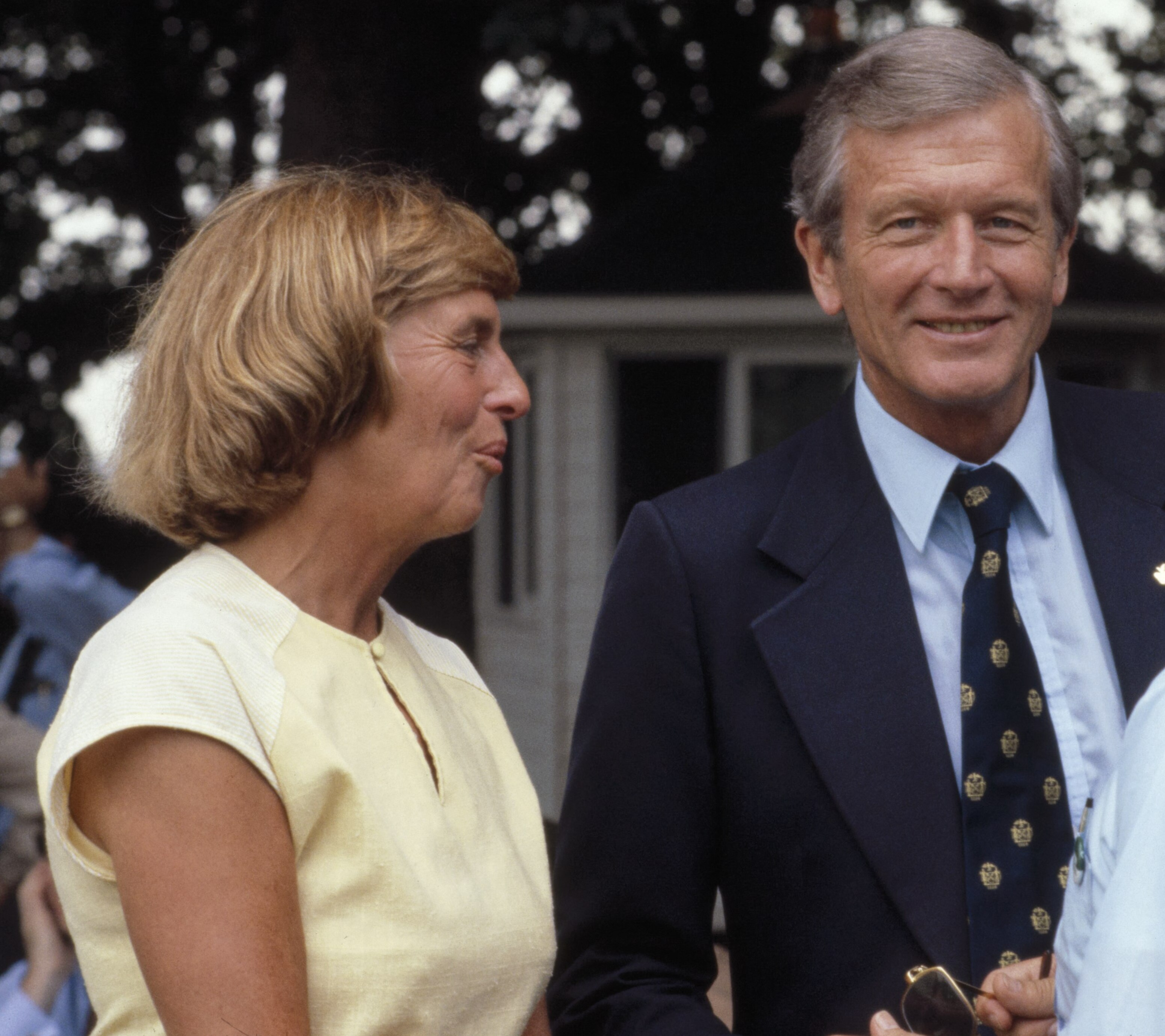
Mary Harrison Lindsay and John Lindsay, at campaign event, between 1969 and 1977

Lindsay was born in New York City on West End Avenue to George Nelson Lindsay and the former Florence Eleanor Vliet. He grew up in an upper-class family of English and Dutch descent. Lindsay's paternal grandfather migrated to the United States in the 1880s from the Isle of Wight, and his mother was from an upper-middle-class family that had been in New York since the 1660s. Lindsay's father was a successful lawyer and investment banker. Lindsay attended the Buckley School, St. Paul's School, and Yale, where he was admitted to the class of 1944 and joined Scroll and Key.

With the outbreak of World War II, Lindsay completed his studies early and in 1943 joined the United States Navy as a gunnery officer. He obtained the rank of lieutenant, earning five battle stars through action in the invasion of Sicily and a series of landings in the Asiatic-Pacific theater. After the war, he spent a few months as a ski bum, and a couple of months training as a bank clerk, before returning to New Haven, where he received his law degree from Yale Law School in 1948, ahead of schedule. In 1949, he began his legal career at the law firm of Webster, Sheffield, Fleischmann, Hitchcock & Chrystie.

Lindsay met his future wife, Mary Anne Harrison (1926–2004), at the 1946 wedding of Nancy Walker Bush (daughter of Connecticut's Senator Prescott Bush and sister of future President George H. W. Bush), where Lindsay was an usher and Harrison a bridesmaid. She was a graduate of Vassar College, and a distant relative of William Henry Harrison and Benjamin Harrison. They married in 1949. That same year Lindsay was admitted to the bar, and rose to become a partner in his law firm four years later. They had three daughters and a son.

== U.S. Representative ==
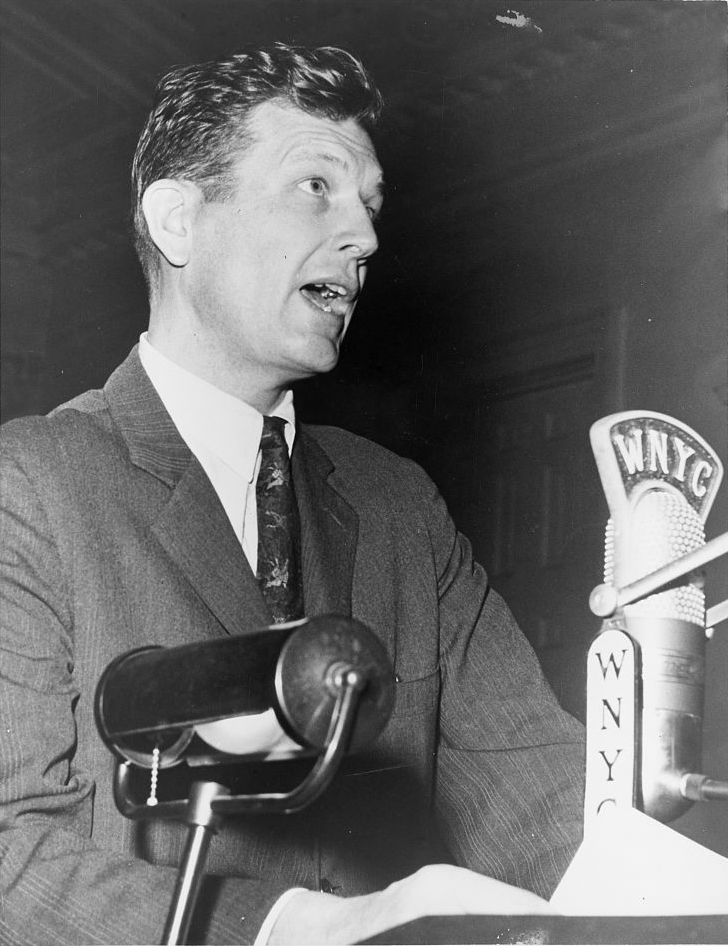
Congressman Lindsay speaking at the New York City Board of Estimate meeting at City Hall in April 1963

Lindsay began gravitating toward politics as one of the founders of the Youth for Eisenhower club in 1951 and as president of the New York Young Republican Club in 1952. He went on to join the U.S. Department of Justice in 1955 as executive assistant to Attorney General Herbert Brownell. There he worked on civil liberties cases as well as the 1957 Civil Rights Act. In 1958, with the backing of Brownell as well as Bruce Barton, John Aspinwall Roosevelt, and Edith Willkie, Lindsay won the Republican primary and went on to be elected to Congress as the representative of the affluent "Silk Stocking" 17th district, exemplified by Manhattan's Upper East Side but also encompassing the diverse Lower East Side and historically bohemian Greenwich Village.

While in Congress, Lindsay established a liberal voting record increasingly at odds with his own party. He was an early supporter of federal aid to education and Medicare, and advocated the establishment of a federal United States Department of Housing and Urban Development and a National Foundation for the Arts and Humanities. He was called a maverick, casting the lone dissenting vote for a Republican-sponsored bill extending the power of the Postmaster General to impound obscene mail, and one of only two dissenting votes for a bill allowing federal interception of mail from Communist countries. Also known for his wit, when asked by his party leaders why he opposed legislation to combat Communism and pornography, he replied that the two were the major industries of his district and if they were suppressed then "the 17th district would be a depressed area". Lindsay voted in favor of the Civil Rights Act of 1960 and 1964, the 24th Amendment to the U.S. Constitution, and the Voting Rights Act of 1965.

== Mayor of New York City ==
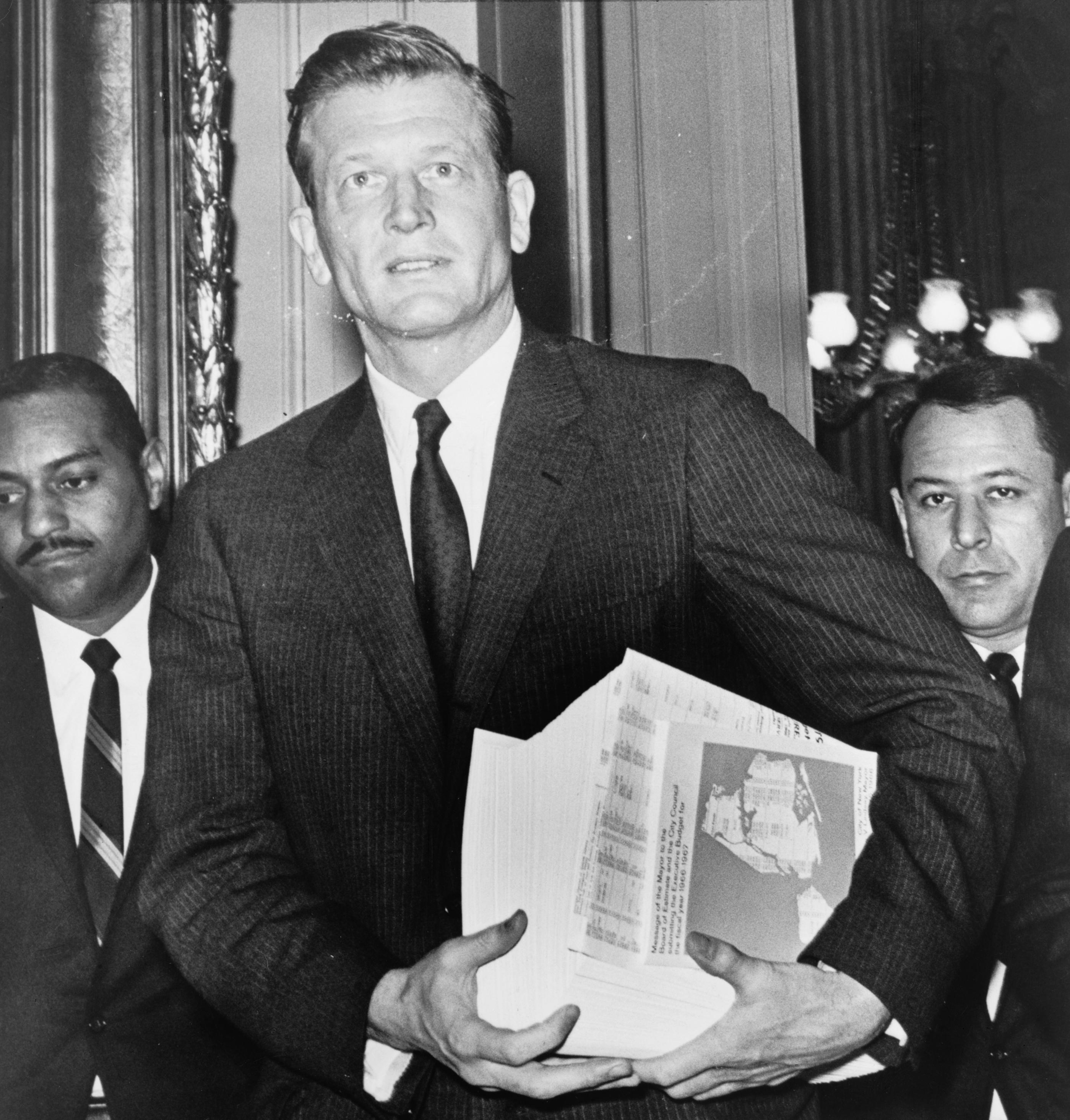
Lindsay as mayor with a physical copy of the city's budget, April 1966

In the 1965 New York City mayoral election, Lindsay was elected mayor of New York City as a Republican with the support of the Liberal Party of New York in a three-way race. He defeated Democratic mayoral candidate Abraham D. Beame, then City Comptroller, as well as conservative thinker and National Review founder William F. Buckley Jr., who ran on the Conservative Party line. The unofficial motto of the campaign, taken from a Murray Kempton column, was "He is fresh and everyone else is tired".

=== Labor issues ===
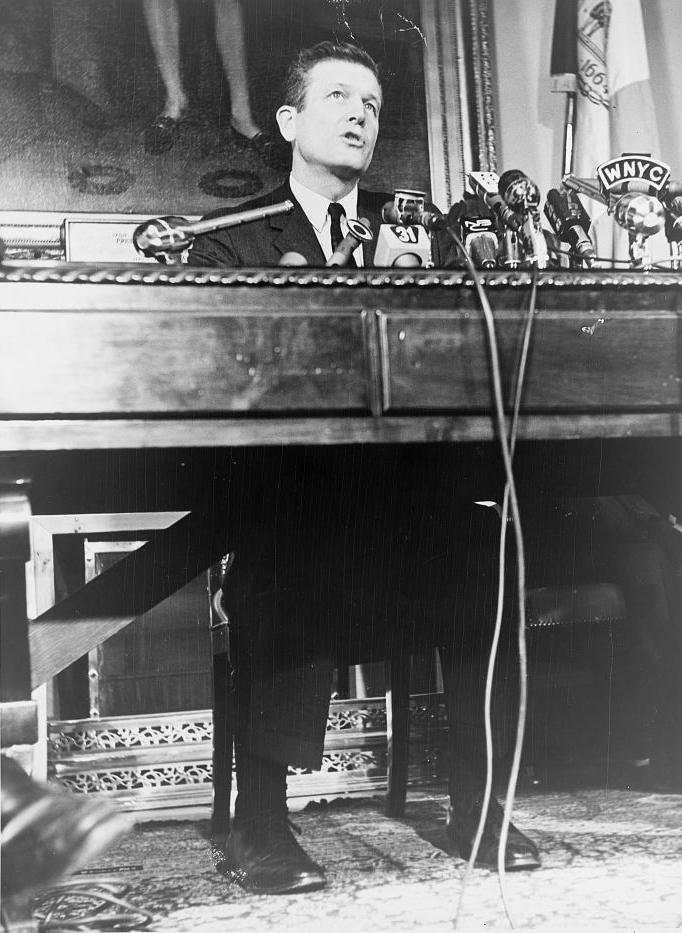
Lindsay speaking at City Hall in January 1966

On his first day as mayor, January 1, 1966, the Transport Workers Union of America, led by Mike Quill, shut down the city with a complete halt of subway and bus service. As New Yorkers endured the transit strike, Lindsay remarked, "I still think it's a fun city", and walked four miles (6 km) from his hotel room to City Hall in a gesture to show it. Dick Schaap, then a columnist for the New York Herald Tribune, popularized the term in an article titled "Fun City". In the article, Schaap sardonically pointed out that it was not.

In 1966, the settlement terms of the transit strike, combined with increased welfare costs and general economic decline, forced Lindsay to lobby the New York State legislature for a new municipal income tax and higher water rates for city residents, plus a new commuter tax for people who worked in the city but resided elsewhere. The transit strike was the first of many labor struggles. In 1968, in an attempt to decentralize the city's school system, Lindsay granted three local school boards in the city complete control over their schools, in an effort to allow communities to have more of a say in their schools. The city's teachers union, the United Federation of Teachers, saw the breakup as a way of union busting, since a decentralized school system would force the union to negotiate with 33 separate school boards rather than with one centralized body. In May 1968, several teachers working in schools located in the neighborhood of Ocean Hill-Brownsville, one of the neighborhoods where the decentralization was being tested, were fired from their jobs by the community-run school board. The UFT demanded the reinstatement of the dismissed teachers, citing that the teachers had been fired without due process. When their demands were ignored, the UFT called the first of three strikes, leading ultimately to a protracted citywide teachers' strike that stretched over a seven-month period between May and November.

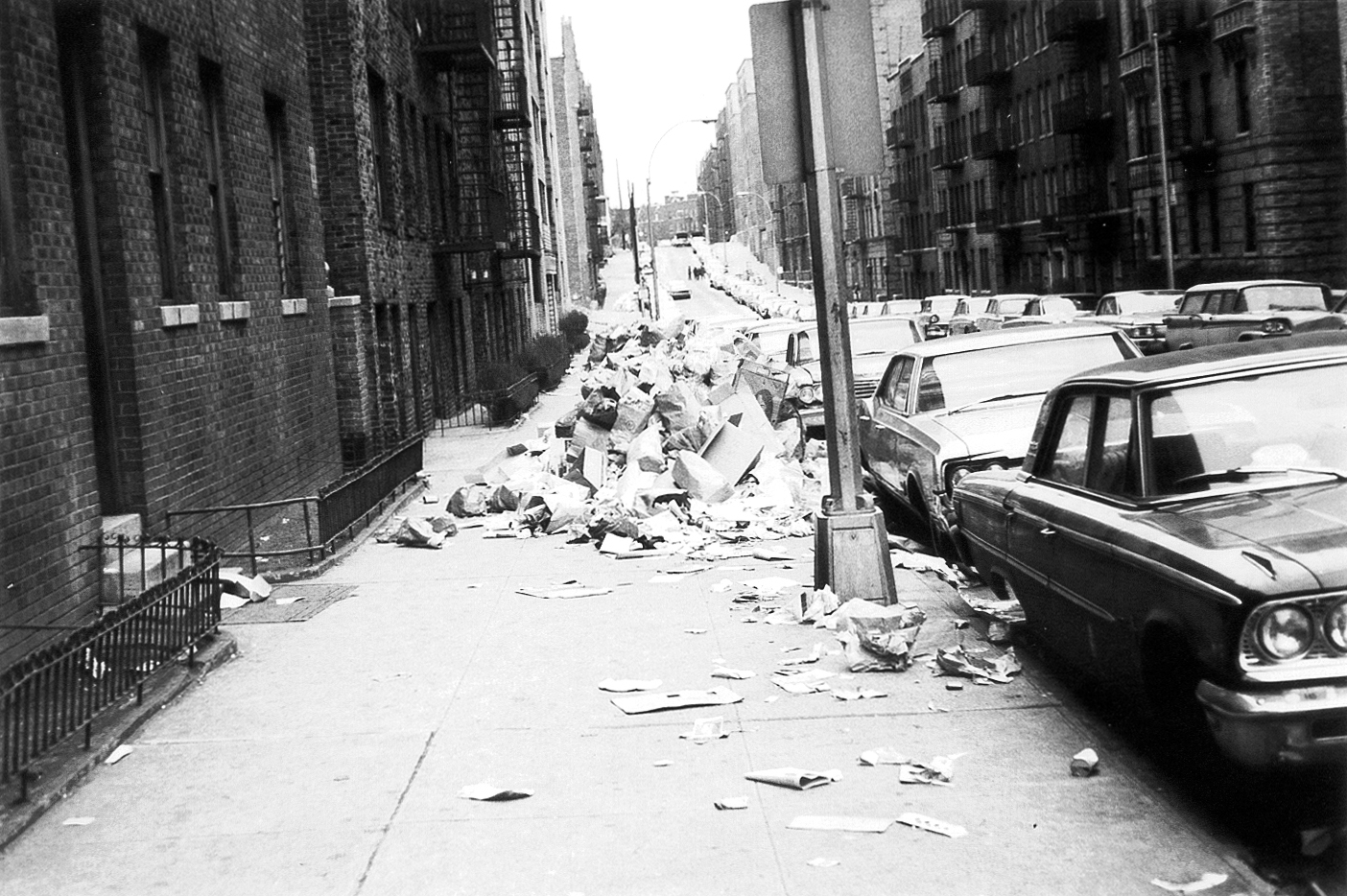
Scene from the New York City sanitation strike, February 1968

The strike was tinged with racial and anti-Semitic overtones, pitting Black and Puerto Rican parents against Jewish teachers and supervisors. Many thought the mayor had made a bad situation worse by taking sides against the teachers. The episode left a legacy of tensions between African-Americans and Jews that went on for years, and Lindsay called it his greatest regret. The year 1968 also saw a three-day Broadway strike and a nine-day sanitation strike. Quality of life in the city reached a nadir during the sanitation strike as mounds of garbage caught fire and strong winds blew the filth through the streets. In June 1968, the New York City Police Department deployed snipers to protect Lindsay during a public ceremony, shortly after they detained a knife-wielding man who had demanded to meet the mayor. With the schools shut down, police engaged in a slowdown, firefighters threatening job actions, the city awash in garbage, and racial and religious tensions breaking to the surface, Lindsay later called the last six months of 1968 "the worst of my public life."

The summer of 1971 ushered in another devastating strike as over 8,000 workers belonging to AFSCME District Council 37 walked off their jobs for two days. The strikers included the operators of the city's drawbridges and sewage treatment plants. Drawbridges over the Harlem River were locked in the "up" position, barring automobile travel into Manhattan, and hundreds of thousands of gallons of raw sewage flowed into local waterways.

=== Racial and civil unrest ===
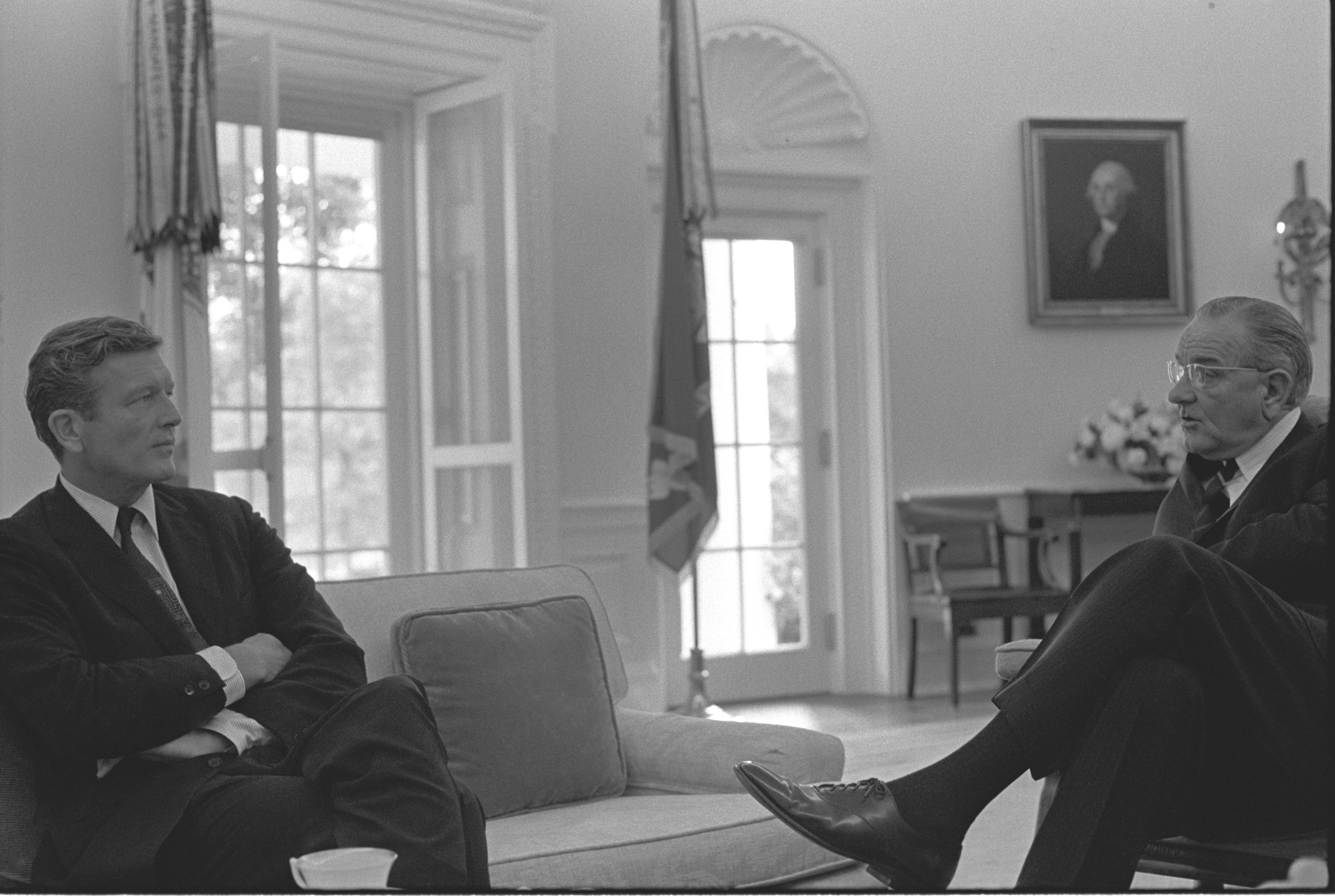
Lindsay with U.S. President Lyndon B. Johnson in the Oval Office, August 1967

Lindsay served on the National Advisory Commission on Civil Disorders, known as the Kerner Commission, and was its vice chairman. This body was appointed in 1967 by President Johnson after riots in urban centers of the US, including Newark and Detroit. Lindsay maximized publicity and coverage of his activities on the commission, and while other commissioners made inconspicuous visits to riot-damaged sites, Lindsay would alert the press before his fact-finding missions. Nonetheless, he was especially influential in producing the Kerner Report; its dramatic language of the nation "moving toward two societies, one black, one white—separate and unequal" was consistent with his rhetoric.

President Johnson ignored the report and rejected the Kerner Commission's recommendations. In April 1968, one month after the release of the Kerner report, rioting broke out in more than 100 cities following the assassination of Martin Luther King Jr. However, in New York City, Lindsay traveled directly into Harlem, telling Black residents that he regretted King's death and was working against poverty. He is credited with averting riots in the city with this direct response, even as other major cities burned. David Garth, who accompanied Lindsay that night, recalled: "There was a wall of people coming across 125th Street, going from west to east ... I thought we were dead. John raised his hands, said he was sorry. It was very quiet. My feeling was, his appearance there was very reassuring to people because it wasn't the first time they had seen him. He had gone there on a regular basis. That gave him credibility when it hit the fan."

Lindsay showed his support for New York's African American community through his administration's sponsorship of the 1969 Harlem Cultural Festival, which is documented in the 2021 music film Summer of Soul. The host of the festival, Tony Lawrence, introduces the mayor to the Harlem crowd as "our blue-eyed soul brother".

=== Blizzard of 1969 ===
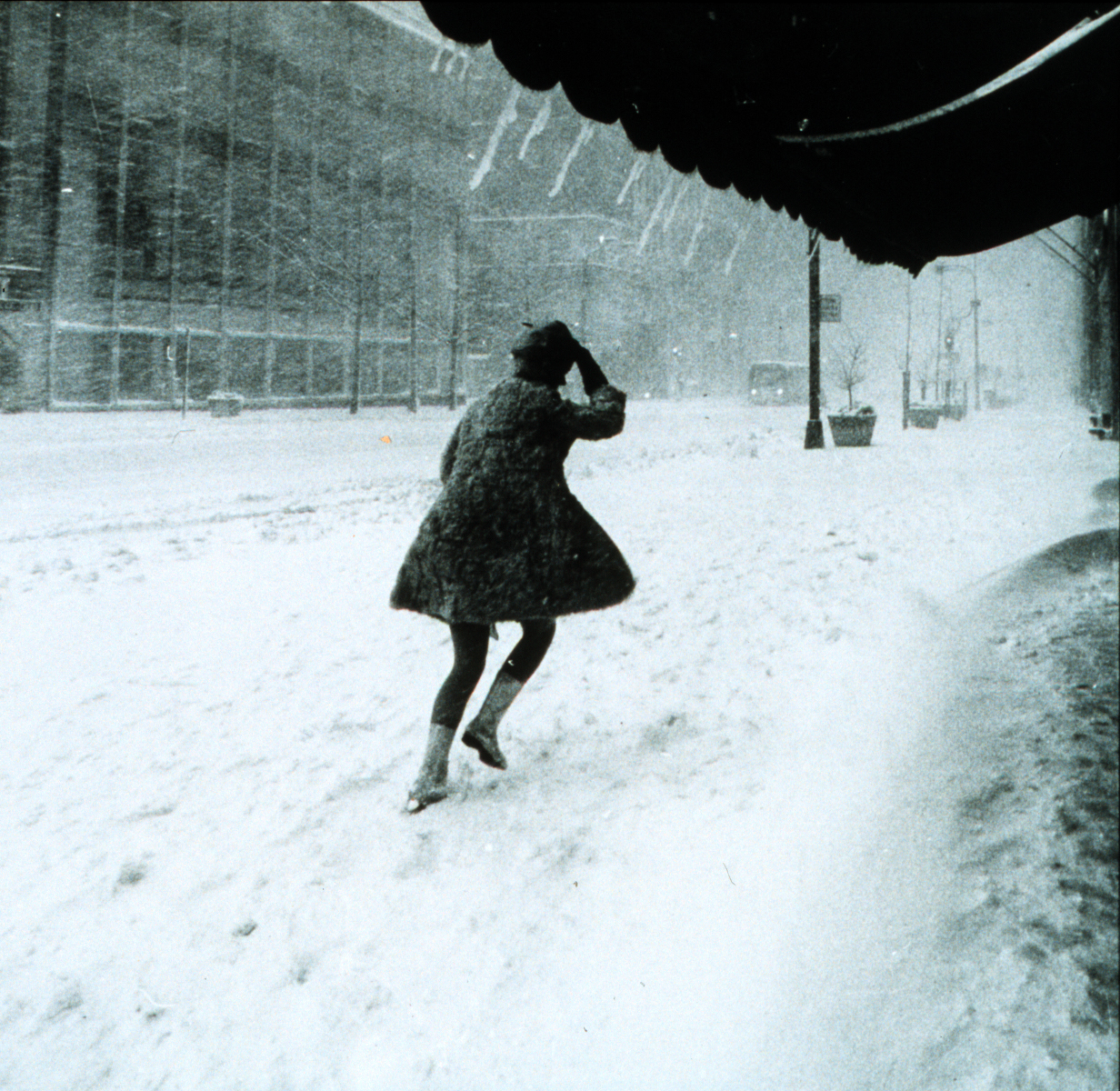
A street in New York City during the 1969 storm. This scene is in Manhattan.

On February 10, 1969, New York City was pummeled with 15 inches (38 cm) of snow. On the first day alone, 14 people died and 68 were injured. Within a day, the mayor was criticized for giving favored treatment to Manhattan at the expense of the other boroughs. Charges were made that a city worker solicited a bribe to clean streets in Queens.

Over a week later, streets in eastern Queens still remained unplowed by the city, enraging the borough's residents, many who felt that the city's other boroughs always took a back seat to Manhattan. Lindsay traveled to Queens, but his visit was not well received. His car could not make its way through Rego Park, and even in a four-wheel-drive truck, he had trouble getting around. In Kew Gardens Hills, the mayor was booed; one woman screamed, "You should be ashamed of yourself." In Fresh Meadows, a woman told the mayor: "Get away, you bum."

The blizzard, dubbed the "Lindsay Snowstorm", prompted a political crisis that became "legendary in the annals of municipal politics", as the scenes conveyed a message that the mayor of New York City was indifferent to the middle class and poor citizens of the city.

=== Reelection ===
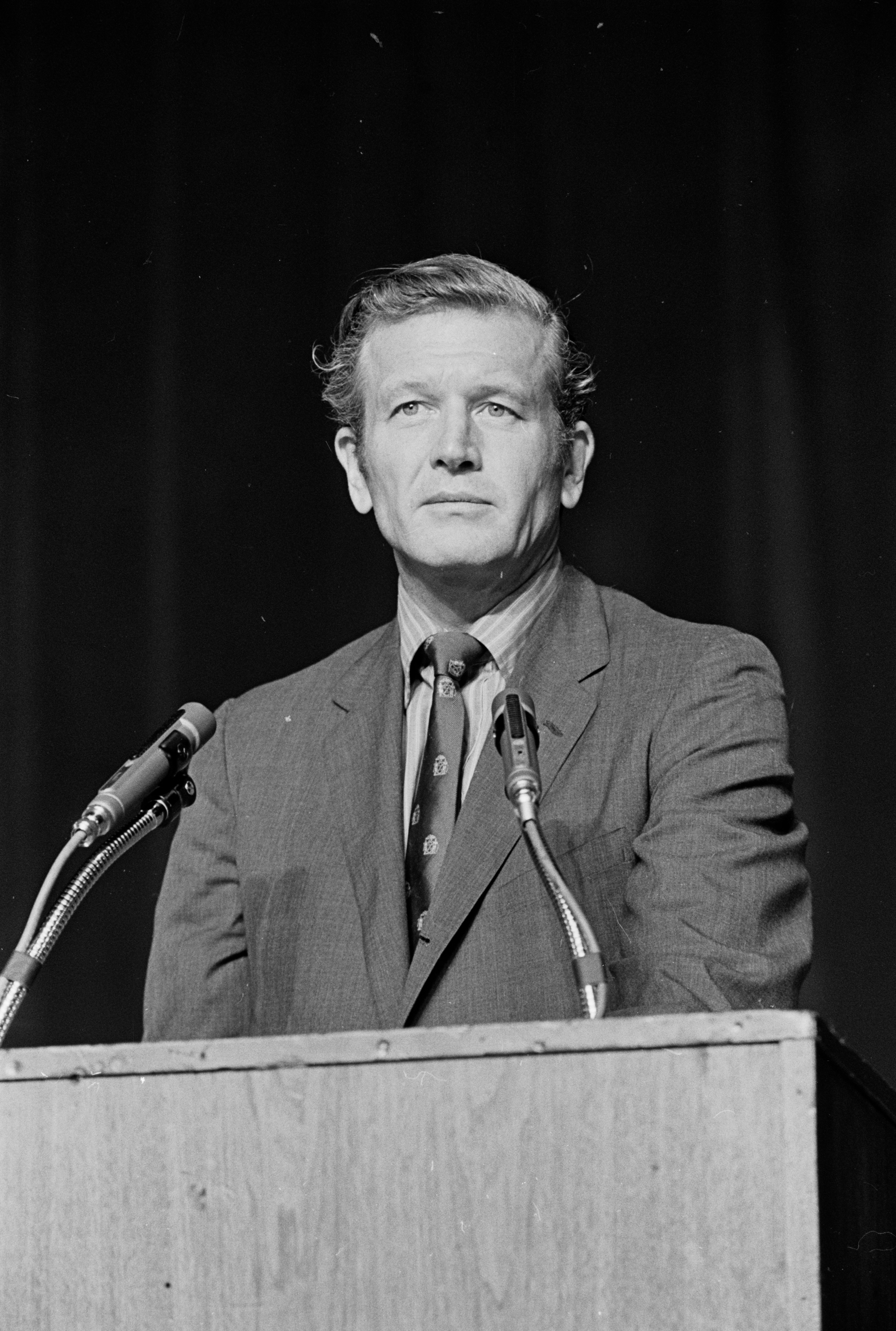
Lindsay speaking at an anti-Safeguard Program rally in Madison Square Garden, June 25, 1969

In 1969, a backlash against Lindsay caused him to lose the Republican mayoral primary to state Senator John Marchi, who was enthusiastically supported by William F. Buckley and the rest of the party's conservative wing. In the Democratic primary, the most conservative candidate, City Comptroller Mario Procaccino, defeated several more liberal contenders and won the nomination with only a plurality of the votes. He quipped, "The more the Mario." Procaccino, who ran to Lindsay's right, went on to coin the term "limousine liberal" to describe Lindsay and his wealthy Manhattan backers. Despite losing the Republican nomination, Lindsay remained on the ballot as the candidate of the New York Liberal Party. In his campaign he said "mistakes were made" and called being mayor of New York City "the second toughest job in America."

Two television advertisements described his position: In one he looked directly into the camera and said, "I guessed wrong on the weather before the city's biggest snowfall last winter. And that was a mistake. But I put 6,000 more cops on the streets. And that was no mistake. The school strike went on too long and we all made some mistakes. But I brought 225,000 more jobs to this town. And that was no mistake... And we did not have a Detroit, a Watts or Newark. And those were no mistakes. The things that go wrong are what make this the second toughest job in America. But the things that go right are those things that make me want it." The second opened with a drive through the Holland Tunnel from lower Manhattan toward New Jersey and suggested, "Every New Yorker should take this trip at least once before election day", followed by video of Newark, New Jersey which had been devastated by race riots.

While narrowly losing Brooklyn and the Bronx due to Procaccino's ongoing support among ethnic, working class whites (with Marchi winning his native Staten Island), Lindsay won the election with support from three distinct groups. First were the city's minorities, mostly African Americans and Puerto Ricans, who were concentrated in Harlem, the South Bronx and various Brooklyn neighborhoods, including Bedford-Stuyvesant and Brownsville. Second were the white and economically secure residents of certain areas of Manhattan. Third were the whites in the boroughs outside Manhattan who had a similar educational background and "cosmopolitan" attitude, namely residents of solidly middle-class neighborhoods, including Forest Hills and Kew Gardens in Queens and Brooklyn Heights in Brooklyn. This third category included many traditionally Democratic Jewish Americans who disagreed with Procaccino's conservatism. This created a plurality coalition (42%) in Lindsay's second three-way race. His margin of victory rose from just over 100,000 more votes than his Democratic opponent in 1965 to over 180,000 votes over Procaccino in 1969, despite appearing on just one third party ballot line (see New York City Mayoral Elections).

=== Hard Hat Riot ===
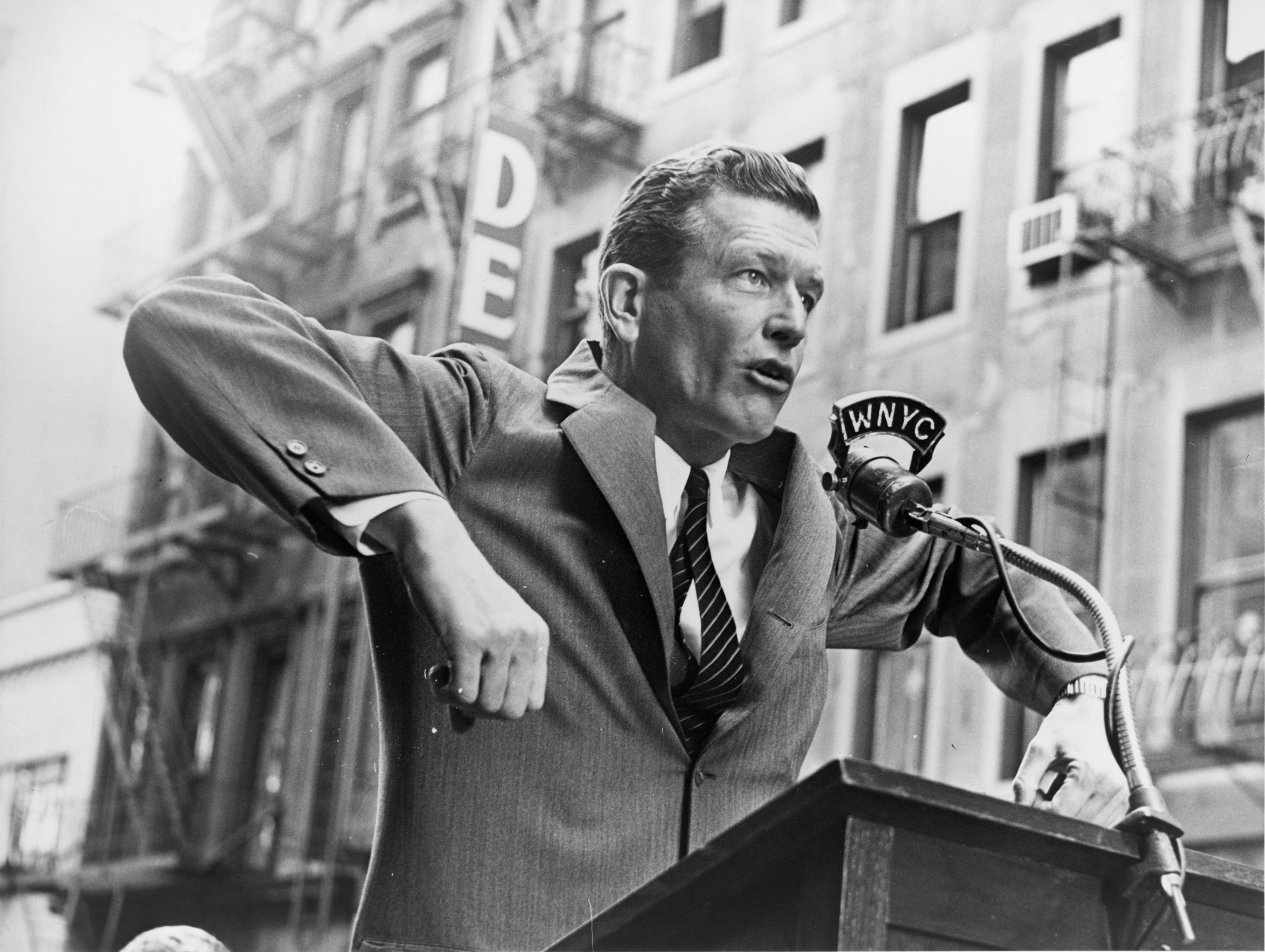
Lindsay speaking at a senior citizens rally in October 1965

On May 8, 1970, near the intersection of Wall Street and Broad Street and at New York City Hall, a riot started when about 200 construction workers mobilized by the New York State AFL–CIO labor federation attacked about 1,000 high school and college students and others protesting the Kent State shootings, the Cambodian Campaign, and the Vietnam War. Some attorneys, bankers, and investment analysts from nearby Wall Street investment firms tried to protect many of the students but were themselves attacked, and some onlookers reported that the police stood by and did nothing. Although more than 70 people were injured, including four policemen, only six people were arrested. The following day, Lindsay severely criticized the police for their lack of action.

Police Department labor leaders later accused Lindsay of "undermining the confidence of the public in its Police Department" by his statements, and blamed the inaction on inadequate preparations and "inconsistent directives" in the past from the mayor's office. Several thousand construction workers, longshoremen and white-collar workers protested against the mayor on May 11 and again on May 16. Protesters called Lindsay "the red mayor", "traitor", "Commie rat", and "bum". The mayor described the mood of the city as "taut".

=== Police corruption ===
In 1970, The New York Times printed New York City Police Department Patrolman Frank Serpico's claims of widespread police corruption. As a result, the Knapp Commission was eventually formed that April by Lindsay, with investigations beginning in June, although public hearings did not start until October 18, 1971. Its preliminary report was not issued until August 1972, and final recommendations only released on December 27, 1972. Because of his forming of the Knapp Commission, many NYPD officers disliked him and did not want him to attend their funerals in case they died on duty and heckled, hissed, jeered and booed him when he did appear. The wife of Rocco Laurie stated that she did not want Lindsay to attend her husband's funeral that year. Laurie was one of two city police officers who were murdered by then-domestic terrorist group Black Liberation Army in 1972.

== Party switch and presidential campaign ==
Lindsay was mentioned as a Republican vice presidential possibility in 1968, but was found to be unacceptable by Southern conservatives, and Maryland Governor Spiro Agnew was nominated instead. Lindsay's original break with the Republican Party began immediately after he failed to win the 1969 Republican mayoral primary, and his subsequent association with the New York Liberal Party for that election. In 1971, Lindsay and his wife cut ties with the Republican Party by registering with the Democratic Party. Lindsay said, "In a sense, this step recognizes the failure of 20 years in progressive Republican politics. In another sense, it represents the renewed decision to fight for new national leadership."

Lindsay then launched a brief and unsuccessful bid for the 1972 Democratic presidential nomination. He attracted positive media attention and was a successful fundraiser. Lindsay did well in the early Arizona caucus, coming in second place behind Edmund Muskie of Maine and ahead of eventual nominee George McGovern of South Dakota. Then in the March 14 Florida primary, he placed a weak fifth place, behind George Wallace of Alabama, Muskie, Hubert Humphrey of Minnesota, and Scoop Jackson of Washington (though he did edge out McGovern). Among his difficulties was New York City's worsening problems, which Lindsay was accused of neglecting; a band of protesters from Forest Hills, Queens, who were opposed to his support for a low income housing project in their neighborhood, followed Lindsay around his aborted campaign itinerary to jeer and heckle him.

His poor showing in Florida effectively doomed his candidacy, which ended after a poor showing in the April 5 Wisconsin primary prompted Lindsay to formally abandon the race. Shortly after his poor showing in Florida, influential Brooklyn Democratic Party chairman Meade Esposito called for Lindsay to end his campaign by stating, "I think the handwriting is on the wall; Little Sheba better come home."

== Later life and death ==
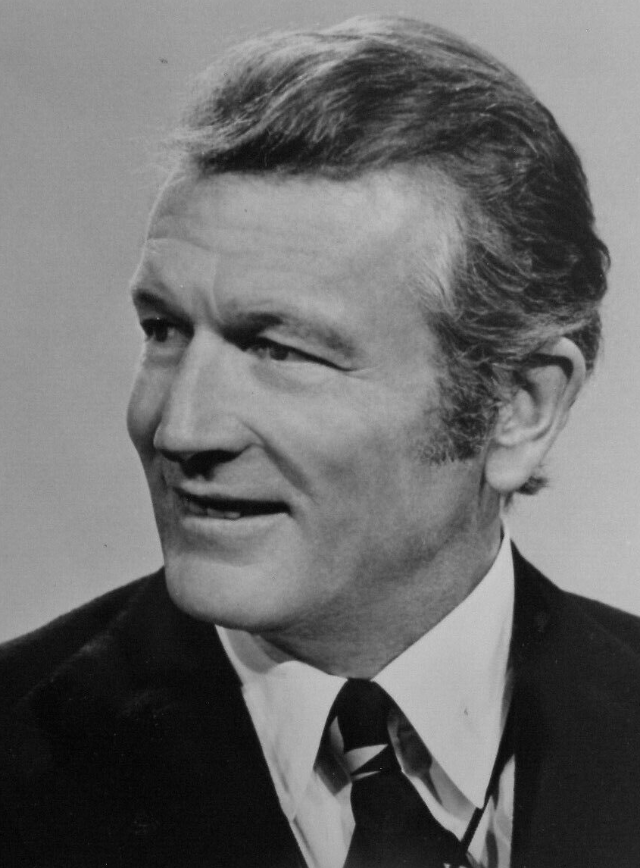
Lindsay in his later years

After leaving office, Lindsay returned to the law, but remained in the public eye as a commentator and regular guest host for ABC's Good Morning America. In 1975, Lindsay made a surprise appearance on The Tony Awards telecast in which he, along with a troupe of celebrity male suitors in tuxedos, sang "Mame" to Angela Lansbury. He presented the award for Best Director Of A Play to John Dexter for the play Equus. Lindsay also tried his hand at acting, appearing in Otto Preminger's Rosebud; the following year his novel, The Edge, was published (Lindsay had earlier authored two non-fiction memoirs): The New York Times, in its contemporary review of the novel, said it was "as dead-serious as a $100-a-plate dinner of gray meat and frozen candidates' smiles."

Attempting a political comeback in 1980, Lindsay made a long-shot bid for the Democratic nomination for U.S. Senator from New York, and finished third. He was also active in New York City charities, serving on the board of the Association for a Better New York, and as chairman of the Lincoln Center Theater. On his death, The New York Times credited Lindsay with a significant role in the rejuvenation of the theatre.

Medical bills from his Parkinson's disease, heart attacks, and stroke depleted Lindsay's finances, as did the collapse of two law firms where he worked, and he found himself without health insurance. Lindsay's eight years of service as mayor left him seven years short of qualifying for a city pension. In 1996, with support from City Council Speaker Peter Vallone, Mayor Rudolph W. Giuliani appointed Lindsay to two largely ceremonial posts to make him eligible for municipal health insurance coverage. He and his wife, Mary, moved to a retirement community in Hilton Head Island, South Carolina, in November 1999, where he died on December 19, 2000, at the age of 79 of complications from pneumonia and Parkinson's disease.

In 2000, Yale Law School created a fellowship program named in Lindsay's honor. In 1998, a park in Brooklyn, Lindsay Triangle, was named in his honor, and in 2001, the East River Park was renamed in his memory. In December 2013, South Loop Drive in Manhattan's Central Park was renamed after Lindsay, to commemorate his support for a car-free Central Park.

== Legacy ==
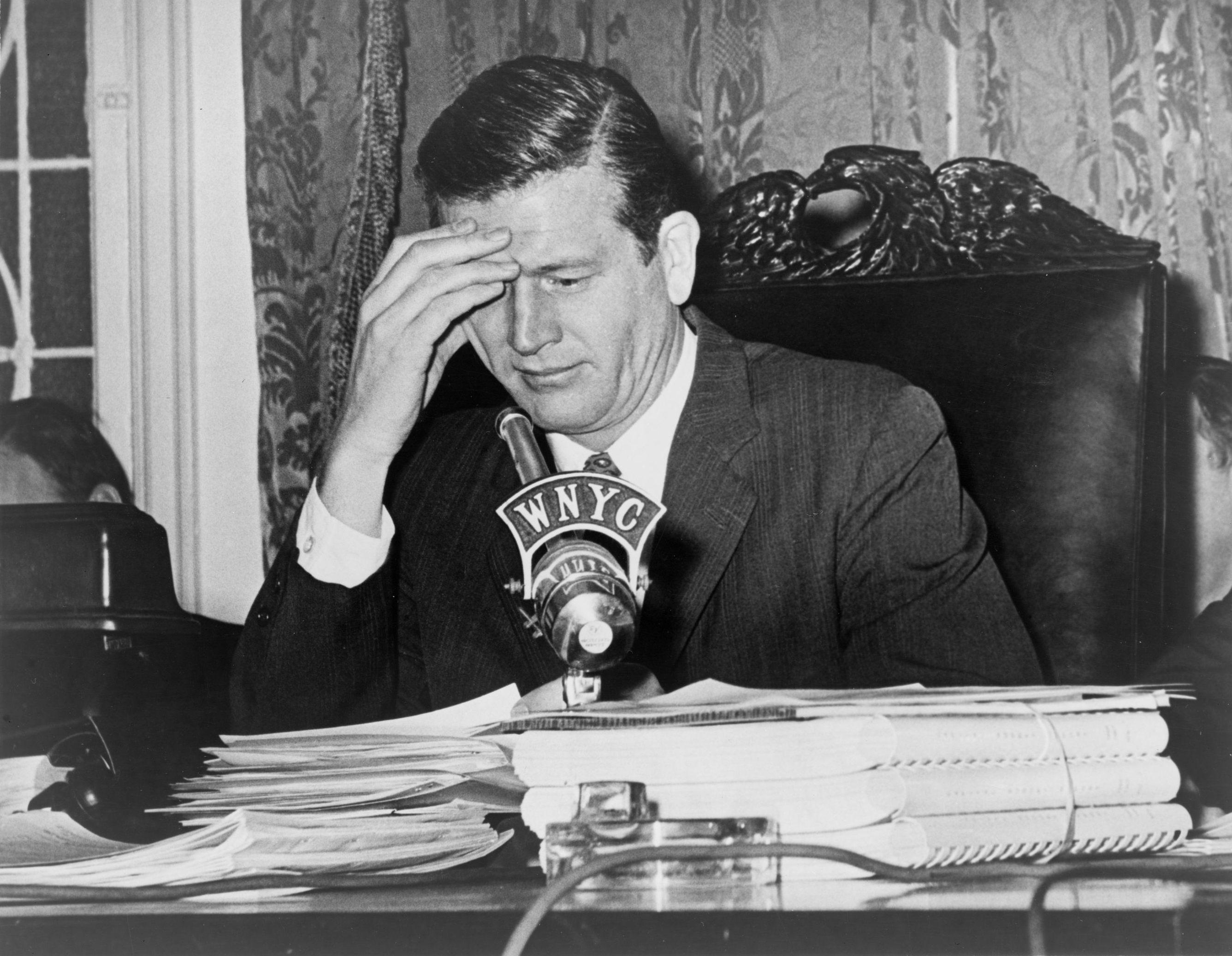
Lindsay at the first public hearing on proposed executive capital budget in February 1966

Mario Cuomo, Carl McCall, and Carter F. Bales were among the many people who started their careers in public service in the Lindsay administration. Al Sharpton said that he still remembered Lindsay having walked the streets of Bedford-Stuyvesant and Harlem when these neighborhoods were doing poorly economically. Lindsay also fought to transform the New York City Civilian Complaint Review Board from an internal police-run department, into a public-minded agency with a citizen majority board.

In a 1972 Gallup poll, 60% of New Yorkers felt Lindsay's administration was working poorly, nine percent rated it good, and not one person thought its performance excellent. By 1978, The New York Times called Lindsay "an exile in his own city". A 1993 survey of historians, political scientists and urban experts conducted by Melvin G. Holli of the University of Illinois at Chicago ranked Lindsay as the sixteenth-worst American big-city mayor to have served between the years 1820 and 1993.

Lindsay's record remained controversial after he left politics. Conservative historian Fred Siegel, calling Lindsay the worst New York City mayor of the 20th century, said, "Lindsay wasn't incompetent or foolish or corrupt, but he was actively destructive." Journalist Steven Weisman observed that "Lindsay's congressional career had taught him little of the need for subtle bureaucratic maneuvering, for understanding an opponent's self-interest, or for the great patience required in a sprawling government."

Lindsay's budget aide Peter C. Goldmark, Jr. told historian Vincent Cannato that the administration "failed to come to grips with what a neighborhood is. We never realized that crime is something that happens to, and in, a community." Assistant Nancy Seifer said, "There was a whole world out there that nobody in City Hall knew anything about ... If you didn't live on Central Park West, you were some kind of lesser being." Many experts traced the city's mid-1970s fiscal crisis to the Lindsay years. An alternate assessment was made by journalist Robert McFadden who said, "By 1973, his last year in office, Mr. Lindsay had become a more seasoned, pragmatic mayor." McFadden also credited him for reducing racial tensions, leading to the prevention of riots that plagued Detroit, Los Angeles, Newark and other cities.

== See also ==
- List of American politicians who switched parties in office
- List of mayors of New York City
- Timeline of New York City, 1960s–1970s

U.S. House of Representatives
Preceded by Frederic Coudert	Member of the U.S. House of Representatives from New York's 17th congressional district 1959–1965	Succeeded by Theodore R. Kupferman
Political offices
Preceded by Robert F. Wagner Jr.	Mayor of New York City; 1966–1973	Succeeded by Abraham Beame
