= Charles S. Bernheimer =

Jewish-American social worker (1868–1960)

Charles Seligman Bernheimer (November 13, 1868 – November 9, 1960) was a Jewish-American social worker.

== Life ==
Bernheimer was born on November 13, 1868, in Philadelphia, Pennsylvania, the son of Seligman Bernheimer and Betty Loeb. He attended Philadelphia public schools.

Bernheimer went to the University of Pennsylvania, graduating from there with a Ph.B. in 1887 and a Ph.D. in 1896. He wrote for The Jewish Exponent and other Philadelphia newspapers from 1887 to 1890. He then worked as business secretary of the Jewish Publication Society of America from 1890 to 1906. He then moved to New York City, New York, and worked as assistant head worker of the University Settlement until 1910. He was superintendent of the Hebrew Educational Society of Brooklyn from 1910 to 1919. While working with the University Settlement, he played a prominent role in supporting the workers of the New York shirtwaist strike of 1909.

Bernheimer was associated with the Bureau of Jewish Social Research and the Metropolitan League of YMHA's. In 1921, he joined the National Jewish Welfare Board as its director of studies. He became an editorial board member of its publication The Jewish Center in 1922, and in 1927 he became the managing editor. He also contributed articles to The Jewish Center from 1922 to 1939. He joined the editorial board of the Jewish Social Service Quarterly in 1935. He left the National Jewish Welfare Board in 1940 and The Jewish Center in 1946. He edited the Jewish Center Worker from 1948 to 1952. He was a founder of the National Association of Jewish Center Workers, served as its president in 1932 and its chairman of the committee on proceedings from 1941 to 1948 and became its honorary president in 1942.

Bernheimer's unpublished thesis was on public education in Philadelphia. He read papers, gave addresses, and wrote articles on social settlement work, activities of immigrant Jews, and immigration in general. He contributed articles on political and social subjects to secular and Jewish periodicals. He compiled and edited The Russian Jew in the United States in 1905. He cowrote Boys' Clubs with J. M. Cohen in 1914. He wrote a number of articles on Jewish education and sociological subjects, including some that appeared in the American Jewish Year Book. He wrote his memoirs Half a Century in Community Service in 1948.

Bernheimer was president of the Jewish Social Workers of Greater New York from 1915 to 1917 and the Brooklyn Neighborhood Associations in 1916. He was a member of the American Jewish Historical Society, the American Sociological Society, and the Conference on Jewish Relations. He was part of the local school board from 1912 to 1916. During World War I, he was a member of the Brownsville food conservation committee in Brooklyn. He attended Temple Shaaray Tefila, serving as its president from 1930 to 1932 and as a director of its Men's Club. He married Lillian Davis in 1915.

Bernheimer died in Long Island College Hospital in Brooklyn on November 9, 1960.
