= Genevieve Earle =

American politician (1885–1956)

Genevieve B. Earle
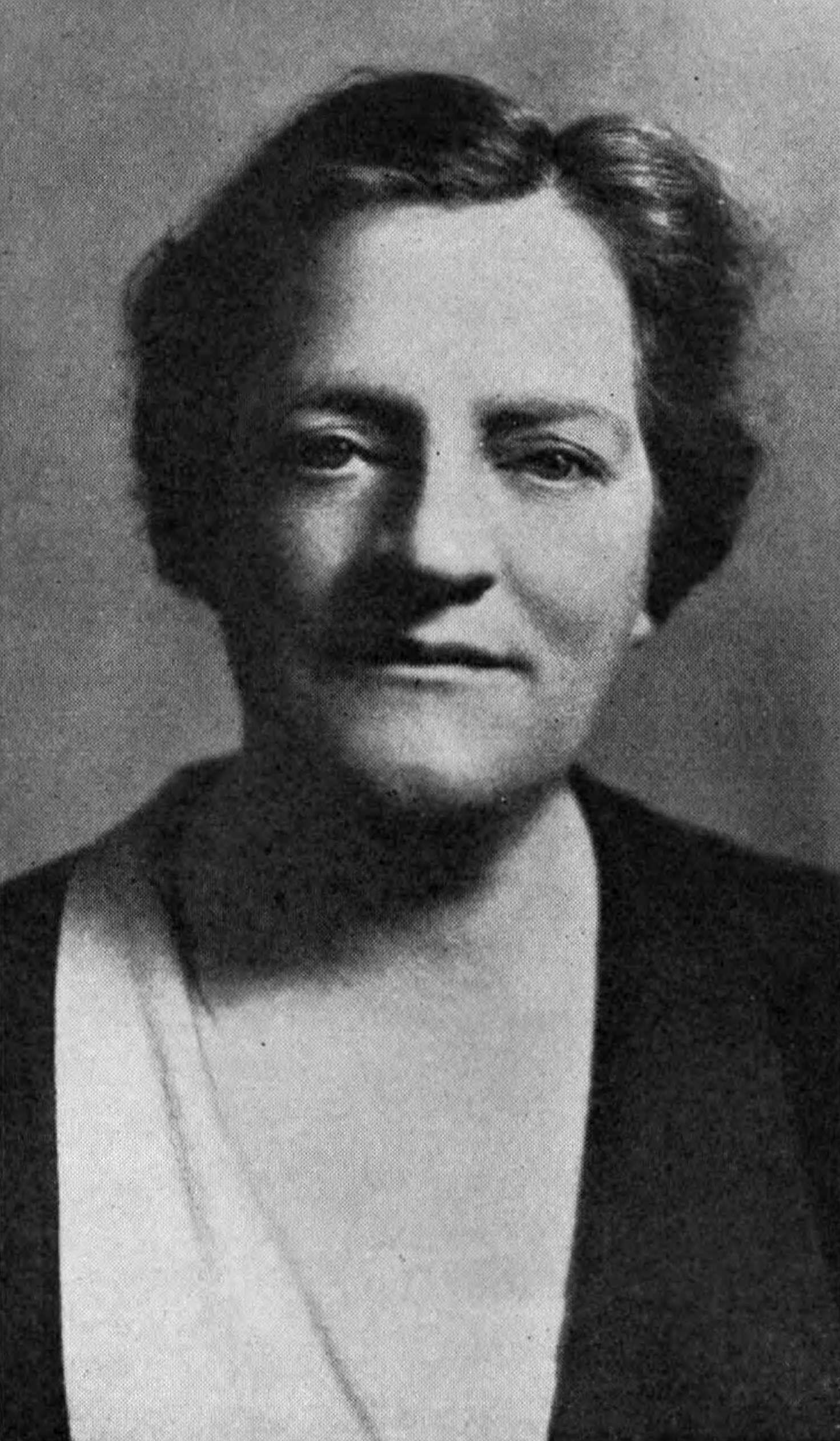
- Earle c. 1938

Minority Leader of the New York City Council
- In office December 22, 1939 – December 31, 1949
- President: Newbold Morris; Vincent R. Impellitteri
- Preceded by: Andrew R. Armstrong
- Succeeded by: Stanley M. Isaacs

Member of the New York City Council from Manhattan At-Large
- In office January 1, 1938 – December 31, 1949
- Preceded by: Constituency established
- Succeeded by: Constituency abolished

Personal details
- Born: 1885 New York City, U.S.
- Died: March 7, 1956 (aged 72–73) Bellport, New York, U.S.
- Party: City Fusion; Republican
- Spouse(s): William P. Earle, Jr. (m. 1913; died 1940)
- Education: Adelphi University
- Known for: First woman elected to the New York City Council

Genevieve Beavers Earle (1885 – March 7, 1956) was a New York City politician. She was the first woman elected to the city council of New York City and the first woman to be involved in a New York City Charter Revision Commission. She was also a feminist.

== Personal life ==
Earle was born in Blythebourne in 1885 and attended Erasmus Hall High School. Earle graduated from Adelphi University in 1907. She had worked in the field of sociology while in school and showed interest in becoming involved in New York politics immediately after graduation. She married William P. Earle, Jr. on October 22, 1913. They had two children, Mary and William, Jr. Earle's husband died in 1940 of an "abdominal ailment." In 1948, she spent four months in the hospital when she broke her hip by slipping on the ice, and this may have influenced her decision to retire from council later. In 1949, she retired from New York City politics and moved to Bell House in Bellport.

Earle died in her home on March 7, 1956, in a fire that may have been "caused by a dropped cigarette in her bedroom."

== Career ==
Earle began working in politics in 1907. She started doing municipal research in 1908 and was one of the first women in this field. As a direct result of her early studies, salaries for police patrolmen were increased in New York. She chaired a woman's committee for the election of John Purroy Mitchel in 1917. Also in 1917, she was appointed to the board of Child Welfare. Earle was president of the Brooklyn chapter of the League of Women Voters.

Earle served as the first woman on a New York City Charter Revision Commission during 1935 to 1936. The charter created by the commission was adopted in 1936 and initiated the use of proportional representation in the city’s elections. She was awarded a gold medal of service to Brooklyn, partly because of her work on the commission, which was presented by Mayor La Guardia in 1936.

Earle was the first woman elected to the New York City Council in 1937, and she was the only woman to serve as a council member in the city for some time. She was one of a pool of 99 candidates for council, out of which 9 were voted in. Earle ran as a member of the City Fusion Party, and also had the support of many African American voters in Brooklyn. Earle also appointed a black woman, Emily V. Gibbes, to a job in the city as a secretary. She served in council from 1938 to 1949. Between 1940 and 1949, she was the council's Republican Minority Leader. While on the council, she promoted the creation of recreational centers and playgrounds in the city. In 1953, she was appointed to a five-year term on Suffolk County's Planning Board.

Earle was also involved with libraries. In 1934, Mayor La Guardia appointed her to the board of trustees for the Brooklyn Public Library. Earle worked closely with Municipal Reference Librarian Rebecca B. Rankin, who helped her with research related to council work. Earle was a vice president of the board of the Bellport Memorial Library. She started an archives collection at Bellport Memorial Library.

Adelphi University honored Earle with an Honorary Doctorate of Laws in 1942. In 1962, Adelphi named a girls' dormitory "Earle Hall," in her honor. Another honor was her election as an "honorary life member" of the Women's City Club of New York in 1951.
