= Edgar J. Nathan =

American judge (1891–1965)

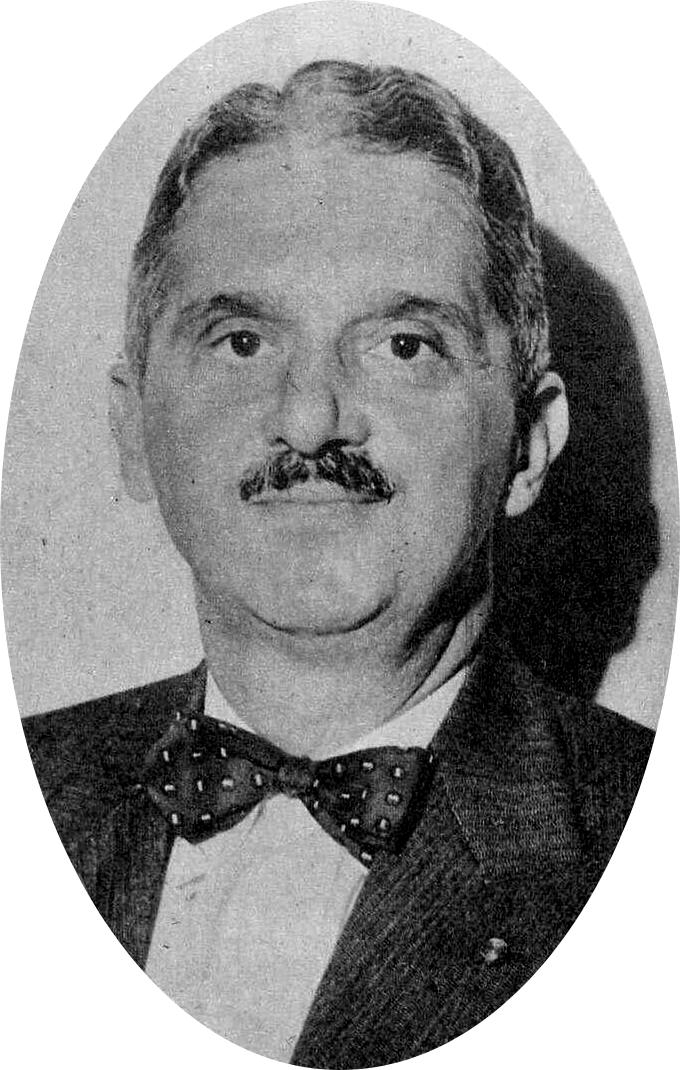
- Nathan c. 1941

14th Borough President of Manhattan
- In office January 1, 1942 – December 31, 1945
- Preceded by: Stanley M. Isaacs
- Succeeded by: Hugo Rogers

Personal details
- Born: August 28, 1891 New York City, U.S.
- Died: April 30, 1965 (aged 73)
- Resting place: Congregation Shearith Israel
- Party: Republican

Edgar J. Nathan (August 28, 1891 – April 30, 1965) was a New York City attorney and political figure who served as Manhattan Borough President from 1942 to 1946. He remains the last Republican to serve as Manhattan Borough President.

== Biography ==
Edgar Joshua Nathan Jr. was born in New York City on August 28, 1891. He graduated from Williams College in 1913 and Columbia University Law School in 1916 From 1916 to 1941 he practiced law in New York City at the firm of Cardozo and Nathan, which included several relatives, including his cousin Benjamin N. Cardozo.

During World War I, Nathan worked in Washington, D.C. as an attorney for the War Trade Board.

A Republican, in 1937 Nathan was elected as a Delegate to the New York State Constitutional Convention, achieving success at the polls despite running in a Democratic district. In 1938 he was an unsuccessful candidate for the New York Supreme Court.

In 1942 Nathan won election as Manhattan Borough President, and he served until 1946. During World War II Nathan was involved in the city's civil defense effort and was a leader of bond drives, metal salvage events and other activities.

After leaving office Nathan returned to the practice of law briefly as a partner in Gale, Bernays, Falk, Eisner & Nathan. In 1946 Governor of New York Thomas E. Dewey appointed Nathan to the New York State Supreme Court. Nathan won election to a full fourteen-year term later that year, and was reelected in 1960. The State Judicial Conference certified Nathan for continued service after he reached the mandatory retirement age for judges of 70, and he remained on the bench until his death.

Nathan died in New York City on April 30, 1965.

== Family ==
Nathan was descended from Abraham de Lucena, one of the first 13 Jewish immigrants to the United States. In addition, his ancestors included Rabbi Gershom Mendes Seixas, who founded New York City's Shearith Israel congregation in 1654. Nathan was President of Shearith Israel from 1951 until his death.

Another Nathan ancestor from his Seixas line, Benjamin M. Seixas, served as an officer of the New York Militia during the American Revolution. As a result, Nathan was able to join the Sons of the American Revolution.

In addition to being related to Benjamin Cardozo, Nathan was also a cousin of Emma Lazarus.

Political offices
Preceded by Stanley M. Isaacs	Borough President of Manhattan; 1942–1946	Succeeded by Hugo Rogers
