= Adolph L. Sanger =

American public official in New York (1842–1894)

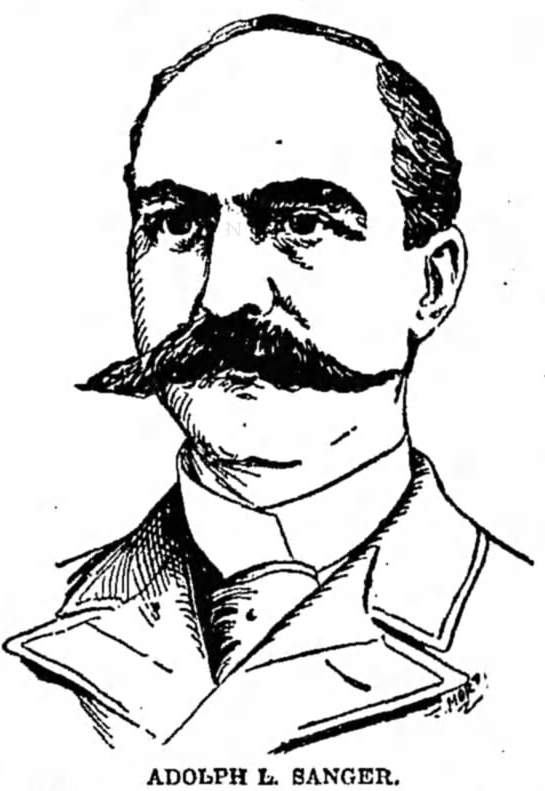
- A sketch of Sanger published with his obituary in an 1894 issue of New York World

Board of Education President
- In office 1893–?

Commissioner of Education
- In office 1886–?

Acting Mayor of New York City
- In office c. 1886 – ?

President of the Board of Aldermen
- Incumbent
- Assumed office 1885

Personal details
- Born: October 8, 1842; Baton Rouge, Louisiana, USA
- Died: January 3, 1894 (aged 51)
- Political party: Democratic Party
- Education: City College of New York; Columbia Law School

Adolph Lewis Sanger (October 8, 1842 – January 3, 1894) was a Jewish-American lawyer from New York.

== Early life and education ==
Sanger was born on October 8, 1842, in Baton Rouge, Louisiana. He moved to New York City, New York, when he was eight. Sanger graduated from the City College of New York with an A.M. in 1862. He then went to Columbia Law School, where he received an LL.B. in 1864 and an LL.M. in 1865. While attending Columbia, he studied law with Benedict & Boardman, leading commercial lawyers in the city at the time.

== Career ==
In 1865, he began practicing law with Myer S. Isaacs. A Democrat, he unsuccessfully ran for Judge of the Marine Court in 1881. In 1870, he was appointed a commissioner of the United States deposit funds. He was a New York presidential elector in the 1880 and 1884 presidential elections. In 1885, he was elected President of the Board of Aldermen. He was serving as Acting Mayor during the reception of the Statue of Liberty. In 1886, he began the first of three terms as a Commissioner of Education. In 1893, he became president of the Board of Education.

Sanger was a leader of B'nai B'rith, president of the Board of Delegates of American Israelites, and vice-president of the Union of American Hebrew Congregations. He was an Executive Committee member of the Grant Monument Association, a director of the Purim Association and the Montefiore Home, President of the Mount Washington Collegiate Association, and superintendent of the Temple Emanu-El religious school.

== Death ==
Sanger died at home from pneumonia on January 3, 1894. The funeral was held in Temple Emanu-El and officiated by Rabbi Gustav Gottheil, who was aided by Rabbi Joseph Silverman and Rabbi William Sparger. The honorary pallbearers included Mayor Thomas Francis Gilroy, School Commissioner Randolph Guggenheimer, Police Commissioner James J. Martin, ex-Attorney General Simon W. Rosendale, Simon Wolf, Jacob Schiff, Julius Bien, and his law partner Myer S. Isaacs. The funeral was also attended by, among other people, the Board of Aldermen (headed by George B. McClellan Jr.), City College of New York President Alexander S. Webb, Professor Richard Gotthiel, Professor Robert Ogden Doremus, Tax Commissioner Joseph Blumenthal, ex-Comptroller Theodore W. Myers, Assistant District Attorney Vernon M. Davis, Senator Jacob A. Cantor, Hugh O. Pentecost, Frederic R. Coudert, Samuel Untermyer, David Leventritt, Dr. Frederick de Sola Mendes, and delegates from various organizations he was involved in. He was buried in Salem Fields Cemetery in Cypress Hills.
