= Hugo Rogers =

American politician (1899–1974)

16th Borough President of Manhattan
- In office January 1, 1946 – December 31, 1949
- Preceded by: Edgar J. Nathan
- Succeeded by: Robert F. Wagner Jr.

Personal details
- Born: Hugo E. Rogers; November 26, 1899 The Bronx, New York City, U.S.
- Died: December 14, 1974 (aged 75)
- Party: Democratic
- Spouse: Adele
- Education: New York University School of Engineering; New York Law School

Hugo E. Rogers (November 26, 1899 – December 14, 1974) was a New York politician who served as the 16th Borough President of Manhattan from 1946 to 1949 and was a leader of Tammany Hall.

== Early life and career ==
Rogers was born in New York in 1899 and attended Stuyvesant High School. He went on to graduate from the New York University School of Engineering and the New York Law School. Rogers served in the infantry in World War I, and was honorably discharged as a sergeant.

Rogers served as a counsel to the Democratic organization in New York's 17th congressional district, located in Harlem, and as counsel and secretary to the Democratic majority leader of the New York State Assembly in 1935. He also served for 14 years on the Tammany Hall law committee.

He enlisted again in 1942 and rose from a second lieutenant to a major, serving at the New York Point of Embarkation.

== Borough President ==
As a candidate, Rogers was an officer in uniform and could therefore not participate in political campaigns or give speeches. Instead, his speeches were made for him by other supporters.

In 1948, against the wishes of New York mayor William O'Dwyer, Rogers was named leader of the Tammany Hall organization, replacing O'Dwyer ally Frank J. Sampson. In 1949, however, he was pushed out of the position by the mayor and replaced by Carmine G. DeSapio. Rogers was then pressured out of running for reelection, although he argued that his departure from the race was only in the interest of party unity.

== Later life ==
Rogers died on December 14, 1974, of a heart attack at Polyclinic Hospital.

== Honors and awards ==
In 1948, Rogers received the Legion of Merit, presented to him by General Courtney Hodges at a ceremony at Fort Jay, on Governors Island. In 1969 he was a winner of the New York University Alumni Meritorious Service Medal.
