= Abram S. Isaacs =

American rabbi (1851–1920)

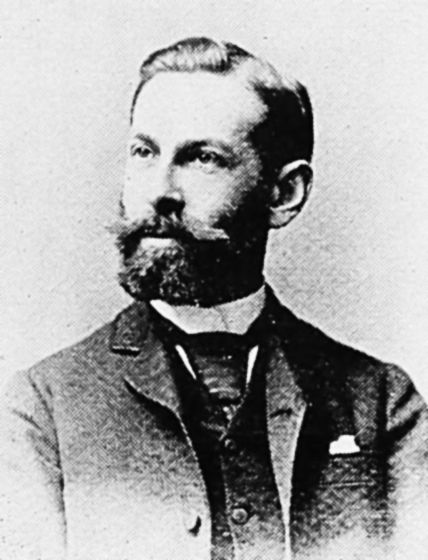
- Born: August 30, 1851; New York, NY
- Died: December 22, 1920
- Occupation(s): Rabbi, Professor, Author
- Employer: New York University
- Known for: Editor of The Jewish Messenger

Abram S. Isaacs (1851-1920) was an American rabbi, author, and professor. Isaacs received his education at the New York University, from which he was graduated in 1871. He became a Rabbi at Barnett Memorial Temple at Paterson, New Jersey. For thirty-five years he occupied a chair at the New York University, first as Professor of Hebrew, then of Germanic languages, and later of Semitics.

Starting in 1878, he edited The Jewish Messenger, a weekly publication devoted to Jewish communal affairs. It became merged in The American Hebrew in 1903, at which time Isaacs withdrew from editorial work. He was also a frequent contributor to periodicals, writing on Judaism and Jewish issues. He published several books, including: A Modern Hebrew Poet: The Life and Writings of Moses Chaim Luzzatto, published in 1878, What is Judaism? and Stories from the Rabbis. For the Encyclopedia Americana he edited the Semitic department. Isaacs wrote the hymn "A Noble Life, a Simple Faith" in the Union Hymnal. Isaacs died at Paterson, N.J., on December 22, 1920.

Isaacs' father was Rabbi Samuel Myer Isaacs, and his brother was lawyer and judge Myer S. Isaacs.

== Bibliography ==
- A Modern Hebrew Poet: The Life and Writings of Moses Chaim Luzzatto, 1878
- School days in our Hometown, memoir
- What is Judaism?, Knickerbocker Press, 1912
- Stories from the Rabbis, 1926
- Step-By-Step: A Story of the Early Days of Moses Mendelssohn, 1910
- Under the Sabbath Lamp: Stories of Our Time for Old and Young, 1919
- "Talmud" article in The Encyclopedia Americana, Encyclopedia Americana Corp., 1919
- The Vision of Huna, poem, published in The Standard Book of Jewish Verse, 1917
