= Samuel Myer Isaacs =

Dutch-American rabbi (1804–1878)

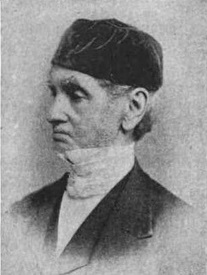
- Born: January 4, 1804; Leeuwarden, The Netherlands
- Died: May 19, 1878 (aged 74)
- Occupations: Rabbi, philanthropist
- Children: Judge Myer S. Isaacs and Rabbi Abram S. Isaacs

Samuel Myer Isaacs (January 4, 1804 – May 19, 1878) was a Dutch-born American educator, philanthropist and rabbi. He was the second Jewish spiritual leader in the United States to teach in English instead of Hebrew or German.

== Early life and education ==
Rabbi Isaacs, born in Leeuwarden, was raised and educated in Great Britain. His service as Principal of the Neveh Zedek orphan asylum in London brought him to the attention of B'nai Jeshurun in New York, and in spite of his lack of rabbinical credentials, they requested him to lead their congregation.

Isaacs's children were lawyer and judge Myer S. Isaacs and Rabbi Abram S. Isaacs.

== Career ==
Rabbi Isaacs arrived in New York City in 1839. He was rabbi at B'nai Jeshurun from that time until around 1845, when a schism split the congregation in two. He left with the newly formed Temple Shaaray Tefila. Rabbi Isaacs was one of the officiating clergymen at President Abraham Lincoln's funeral.

In 1857, he founded the newspaper The Jewish Messenger, of which he was editor from 1867 to 1878. The newspaper merged with The American Hebrew in 1879. He was also a founder of the United Hebrew Charities, now called Jewish Board of Family and Children's Services (1845), the Jew's Hospital, now called Mount Sinai Hospital (1852), and the Board of Delegates of American Israelites (1859).

== Death ==
Samuel Myer Isaacs was interred in Salem Fields Cemetery in Brooklyn.
