= Frances Gaither =

American writer

Frances Ormond Jones Gaither (May 21, 1889 – October 28, 1955) was an American novelist whose major works depict slavery in the plantation South.

Gaither was born in Somerville, Tennessee, but her family moved to Corinth, Mississippi, soon after her birth. She graduated from the Mississippi State College for Women in 1909 and briefly taught high school English in Corinth. Gaither and her husband, Rice, moved to New York City in 1929, where he worked as a journalist and she pursued a writing career. She produced four books for children in the 1930s—three works of fiction, The Painted Arrow (1931), The Scarlet Coat (1934), Little Miss Cappo (1937), and a biography of La Salle entitled The Fatal River (1931)

Gaither is most renowned, however, for her trinity of novels for adult readers about American slavery—Follow the Drinking Gourd (1940), The Red Cock Crows (1944), and Double Muscadine (1949). While long out of print, the second of these works is probably Gaither's most significant work—a dramatic tale of a slave rebellion based on historical events in Hinds County, Mississippi in 1835.
