= Temple Shaaray Tefila =

Reform synagogue in Manhattan, New York

- Hebrew: שערי תפילה
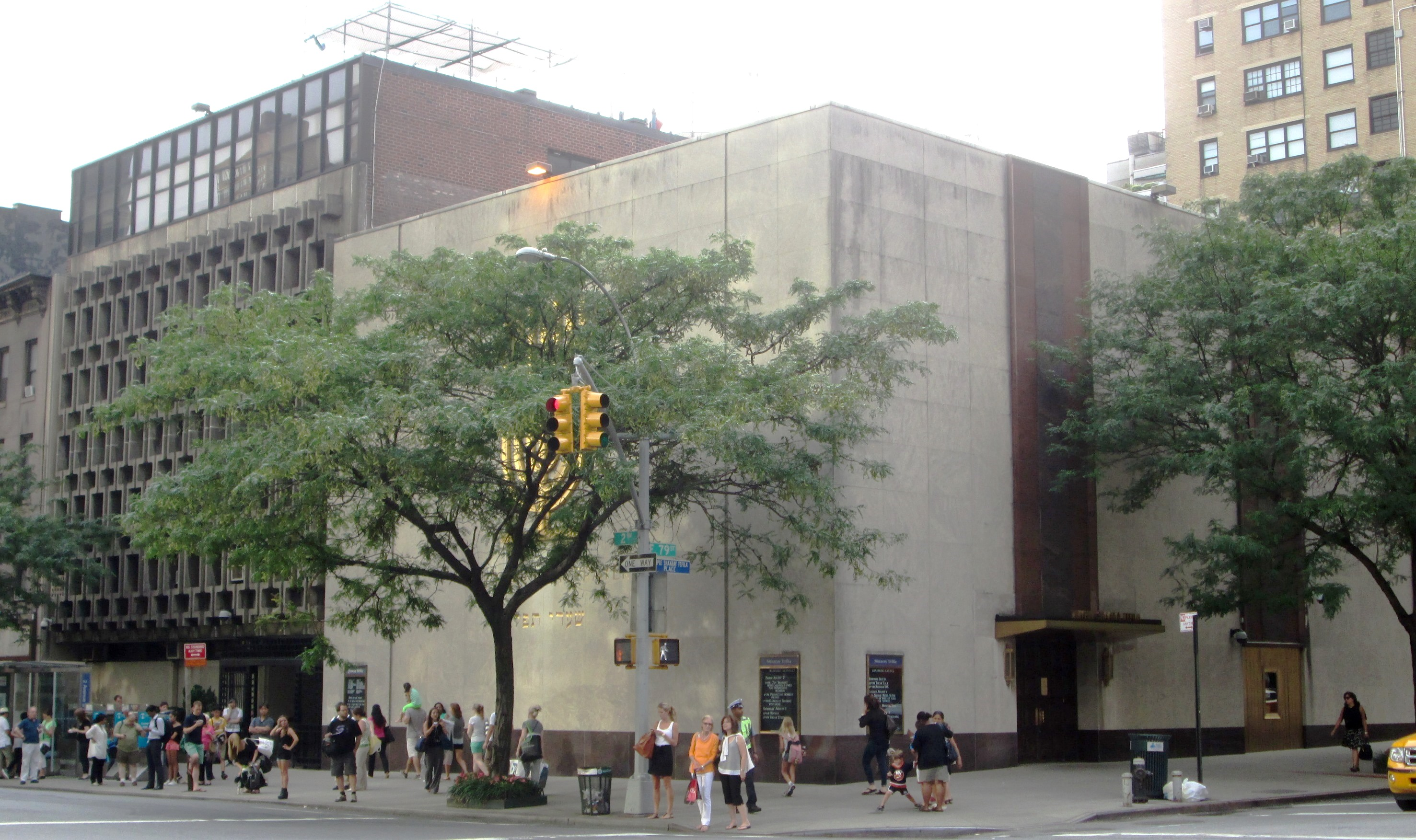
- The synagogue from the northeastern corner of East 79th Street and 2nd Avenue

- Location in Manhattan, New York City

Religion
- Affiliation: Reform Judaism
- Ecclesiastical or organizational status: Synagogue
- Leadership: Rabbi Joel Mosbacher; Rabbi Jill Rubin (Associate)
- Status: Active

Location
- Location: 250 East 79th Street, Upper East Side, Manhattan, New York City, New York 10075
- Country: United States
- Interactive map of Temple Shaaray Tefila
- Coordinates: 40°46′24″N 73°57′20″W

Architecture
- Architects: Wooster Street: Blesch & Eidlitz; West 44th Street: Henry Fernbach; West 82nd Street: Arnold W. Brunner; East 79th Street: John J. McNamara; Horace Ginsbern & Associates
- Type: Synagogue
- Established: 1845 (as a congregation)
- Completed: 1846 (Wooster Street); 1869 (West 44th Street); 1893 (West 82nd Street); 1959 (East 79th Street)
- Construction cost: $1.5 million ($16.7 million today)

Website
- shaaraytefilanyc.org

Temple Shaaray Tefila (Hebrew: שערי תפילה, lit. 'Gates of Prayer') is a Reform Jewish synagogue located at 250 East 79th Street (at the corner of 2nd Avenue) on the Upper East Side of Manhattan in New York City, New York, United States.

The synagogue was founded in 1845, and was officially chartered in 1848. It moved to its current location in 1959. It has over 1,200 family member units, and over 800 students combined in its religious school and early childhood programs.

== History ==
The synagogue was founded in 1845 by 50 primarily English and Dutch Jews who had been members of B'nai Jeshurun, and was officially chartered in 1848. It was initially an Orthodox synagogue. It slowly turned to Reform Judaism over the years.

By 1862 it had 200 members. In 1865, it opened its religious school. In 1871, it consolidated with the Beth-El congregation, which had been organized in 1853.

The services were modified to a shorter, simpler version in 1879. Some of the material was presented in English. That was followed by the synagogue allowing men and women to sit together, introducing organ music and a mixed choir. In 1901, it had 240 members. In 1902, the congregation joined the Reform movement's national organization of congregations, the Organization of American Hebrew Congregations. By 1916, it had 500 members.

In 1921, the synagogue joined the American Reform movement – the Union of American Hebrew Congregations (or UAHC, now the URJ).

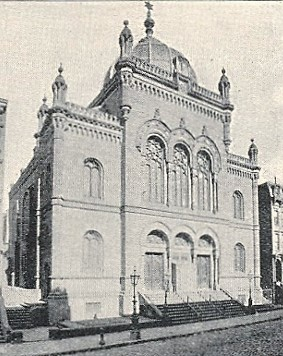
127 West 44th Street synagogue, designed by Henry Fernbach (1869).

In 1993, it established a nursery school for children 2.5 to 5 years of age. In 1996, the corner of East 79th Street and 2nd Avenue at which it sits was designated Temple Shaaray Tefila Place, in celebration of the congregation's 150th anniversary.

== Locations ==
It was initially located on Wooster Street. The synagogue relocated in turn to West 34th Street, West 36th Street, West 44th Street (and Sixth Avenue), and 160 West 82nd Street (near Amsterdam Avenue; where it began to be referred to as West End Synagogue).

In 1958 it purchased land and began construction, and in 1959 it completed construction and moved to its current Upper East Side location at 250 East 79th Street and 2nd Avenue, a theater converted at a cost of $1,500,000 ($16,700,000 in current dollar terms).

== Rabbis ==
The synagogue's first rabbi was Samuel Myer Isaacs, who spoke English, one of only a few such rabbis in the United States. He was a firm adherent of Orthodox Judaism, and retired in 1877. His funeral at the synagogue the following year was the largest Jewish funeral of the nineteenth century.

Beginning in 1877, it was led by Rabbi Frederick de Sola Mendes (who also became the first Chairman of the YMHA during his tenure), and from 1920, it was led by Rabbi Nathan Stern.

Rabbi Bernard Bamberger was the rabbi from 1944 until 1971. He also served as President of the Central Conference of American Rabbis, as well as the World Union for Progressive Judaism.

Rabbi Philip Schechter was then rabbi at the synagogue for a short time. He was fired in February 1971 by a vote of 144–135 of synagogue members 35 years of age and older, when his reforms to the liturgy and loosening of the dress code were not well received by some members of the congregation. He was followed by Senior Rabbi Harvey Tattelbaum, who led the synagogue for three decades, until 2001 when he became Rabbi Emeritus.

Rabbi Jonathan Stein became Senior Rabbi in July 2001, and served until June 2014. He had previously been Senior Rabbi of both Congregation Beth Israel of San Diego and Indianapolis Hebrew Congregation. He also became President of the Central Conference of American Rabbis in March 2011, for a two-year term. As President, he led the principal organization of Reform rabbis in the U.S. and Canada. Following Rabbi Stein's retirement in June 2014, the Board of Trustees appointed Rabbi Deborah Hirsch as the Interim Senior Rabbi, while the Board searched for a senior rabbi replacement.

On February 4, 2016, the congregation unanimously elected Rabbi Joel Mosbacher as Senior Rabbi beginning July 1, 2016. In July 2018, Rabbi Sarah Reines joined the congregation as a rabbi and left in 2022. Rabbi Jill Rubin joined the clergy in August 2022 and currently serves as Associate Rabbi.

== Notable members ==
- Bernard Baruch (1870–1965), financier, stock investor, philanthropist, statesman, and political consultant
- Charles S. Bernheimer (1868–1960), American social worker, served as president of the synagogue
- Sandy Fong (born 1990), finished 21st in the 2008 Summer Olympics 50 metre rifle three positions shooting event
- Leon Klinghoffer (1916–85), disabled appliance manufacturer who was murdered and thrown overboard by Palestinian terrorists hijacking the cruise ship Achille Lauro in 1985; his 800-person funeral was held at the synagogue
- William Schuman (1910–92), composer and music administrator, attended as a child
- Alan V. Tishman (1917–2004), real estate developer, funeral
