= Myer S. Isaacs =

American judge (1841–1904)

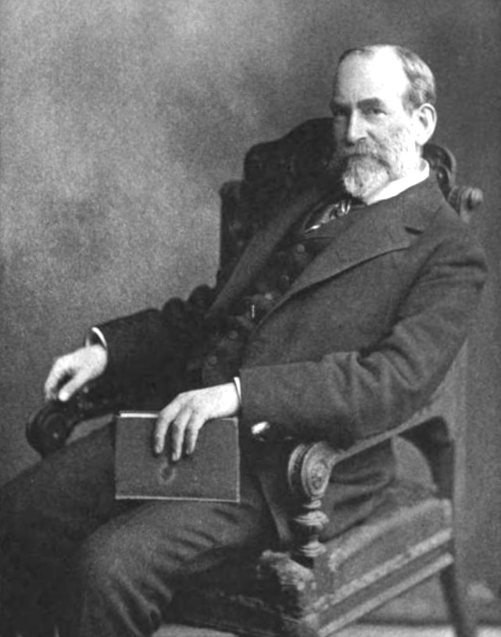
- Born: Myer Samuel Isaacs; May 8, 1841; New York, New York
- Died: May 24, 1904 (aged 63); New York, New York
- Education: New York University School of Law
- Occupation: Jurist
- Political party: Republican
- Spouse: Maria Solomon (m. 1869)
- Children: 6, including Stanley M. Isaacs
- Father: Samuel Myer Isaacs
- Relatives: Abram S. Isaacs (brother)

Myer Samuel Isaacs (May 8, 1841 – May 24, 1904) was a Jewish-American lawyer and judge from New York.

== Life ==
Isaacs was born on May 8, 1841, in New York City, the son of Rev. Samuel Myer Isaacs and Jane Symmonds. His paternal grandfather was born in Leeuwarden, Netherlands and his mother was of English extract. His brother was Rabbi Abram S. Isaacs.

Isaacs attended Forests' Collegiate School. In 1856, he entered New York University, where he was awarded all prizes in freshman and sophomore year. He graduated from there in 1859. He then went to New York University School of Law, graduating from there in 1862. He was admitted to the bar on his twenty-first birthday and began practicing law. His specialty was real estate law, wills, and trusts. He initially clerked in the office of John H. and Samuel Riker prior to his admittance to the bar. In 1866, he became associated with his friend Adolph L. Sanger. In 1870, his brother joined the firm, and the three continued working together until Sanger's death in 1894. In 1896, two of Isaac's sons joined the firm, M. S. and I. S. Isaacs. He continued working for the firm until his death. From 1887 to 1897, he was a lecturer on real estate law for New York University School of Law. He was on the Special Committee of Counsel for the Lawyers' Title Insurance Company since its inception in 1887.

In 1880, Governor Alonzo B. Cornell appointed Isaacs Justice of the Marine Court of New York to fill a vacancy. He was the Republican candidate for that office for the ensuring term, as well as for the Superior Court in 1891 and the New York Supreme Court in 1895, losing all three elections. He was a member of the Committee on Reform Legislation for New York in 1884 as well as a member of a Republican Club committee that proposed amendments to the New York State Constitution in 1894. As a member of the Outdoor Recreation League, he helped established Seward Park on the Lower East Side and the Roof-Playground of the Hebrew Institute. He was active in the movement to improve dwellings for the poor. He helped organize the Citizens Union in 1897. He was a director and vice-president of the Real Estate Exchange from 1886 to 1890. He was also president of the Woodbine Land Improvement Company from 1898 to 1900, and was elected a trustee of Columbia Bank in 1888 and the American Savings Bank in 1890.

Isaacs helped edit his father's paper The Jewish Messenger when it was founded in 1857, when he was only sixteen. He remained active with the paper until he retired from active control in 1872, although he continued to be a contributor for the paper. He was a founder of the Board of Delegates of American Israelites in 1859, serving as its secretary until 1876 and then as its president until 1885. In 1865, he became one of the founders of the Hebrew Free School Association, serving as its president from 1881 to 1892. In 1873, he helped organize the United Hebrew Charities. In 1881, he was elected to the Central Committee of the Alliance Israélite Universelle. He took a leading part in organizing a hospital for chronic sufferers, which became the Montefiore Home, as well as Hebrew Technical Institute and the Purim Association, serving as first president of the latter organization. He was president of the Baron Hirsch Fund, which provided aid for Russian and Romanian Jews who immigrated to the United States. He was a founder and vice-president of the Educational Alliance.

Isaacs was a member of the New York City Bar Association since 1872, the New York State Bar Association since 1883, and the American Bar Association. He was also a member of the Academy of Political and Social Science, the American Academy of Science, and the City Club of New York. He wrote and published several pamphlets, including "The Persecution of the Jews in Roumania" in 1875, "The Jewish Question in Russia" in 1882, and "American Israelites" in 1886. In 1869, he married Maria Solomon. Their children Julien Myer, Lewis Montefiore, Stanley Myer, Minnie Hart, Alice Maria, and Estelle Miriam. Lewis was a lawyer and musician, and Stanley was a lawyer and city official who served as Borough President of Manhattan.

Isaacs died from heart disease in Cafe Savarin in the Equitable Building on May 24, 1904.
