= Jean Lenauer =

Austrian filmmaker and actor

Jean Lenauer was an Austrian-born filmmaker, actor, editor, producer, and distributor.

== Early life ==
Lenauer was born in Vienna on August 9, 1904. At the age of 19, he moved to Paris and worked for several French newspapers and magazines as a film reporter and critic. A 1933 advertisement in The New Republic described Lenauer as "the great Parisian cinema critic."

== Career ==
=== Film distribution ===
Lenauer arrived to New York City in 1935 with a copy of Crime and Punishment, starring Harry Baur. Lenauer showed the film at the Cinema de Paris theater. The film was a hit, endorsed by the National Board of Review, and became the theater's longest-shown film.

Following the success of Crime and Punishment, Lenauer acquired the Filmarte Theater and intended to showcase international films in it.

After Crime and Punishment, I conceived the idea of a theater in New York for the finest foreign films. I felt that there was a large, intelligent public for these films. The theater which I chose, now the Filmarte, was a notorious white elephant. It had been successively a Theater Guild house, the Cort Theater and the John Golden Theater. With the exception of Strange Interlude, most of the legitimate attractions presented there had met with little success. Little wonder, then that motion picture distributors were amazed at my plan and advised me to change my mind. But I asked for it and got what I wanted.

— Lenauer (1938)

=== Filmmaking and editing ===
After World War II, Lenauer became a film editor and producer. He worked as the technical director of the film department of the Museum of Modern Art from 1969 to 1972.

=== Acting ===
Lenauer made his acting debut as the waiter in the 1981 film My Dinner with Andre, directed by Louis Malle and written by star actors Wallace Shawn and André Gregory. The film gave notoriety to Lenauer, who would go on to tour college campuses and discuss his part in the film. Matthew Fishbane of Tablet magazine described Lenauer as "the real star of the movie."

== Personal life ==
Lenauer died in New York City on 23 October 1983 from a cerebral hemorrhage at the age of 79. He was survived by his son, Michael, and daughter, Katherine.
