= Jay (surname) =

Jay is a surname. Notable people with the surname include:

- Allan Jay (1931–2023), British world champion épée & foil fencer
- Antoine Jay (1770–1854), French writer
- Antony Jay (1930–2016), British writer
- Bill Jay (1940–2009) photographer, magazine and picture editor, etc
- Candee Jay (born 1981), Dutch musician
- Charlotte Jay (1919–1996), Australian writer
- David Jay (born 1982), American activist
- Douglas Jay (1907–1996), British politician
- Georgia Jay, British actress
- Isabel Jay (1879–1927), British opera singer
- Jennifer Jay (born 1969) American environmental engineer
- Joey Jay (born 1935), American baseball player
- John Jay (1745–1829), American politician and jurist
- John Jay (1817–1894), American lawyer
- John Jay Schieffelin (1897–1987), an American rear admiral and executive director of the English-Speaking Union
- Jon Jay (born 1985), American baseball player
- Karla Jay (born 1947), American writer
- Margaret Jay, Baroness Jay of Paddington (born 1939), British politician
- Marie-Louise Jaÿ (1838–1925), French businesswoman
- Martin Jay (born 1944), American historian
- Michael Jay, Baron Jay of Ewelme (born 1946), British politician
- Norman Jay (born 1957), British DJ
- Paul Jay (born 1951), Canadian film director and journalist
- Paul L. Jay (born 1946), American literary theorist
- Peter Augustus Jay (1776–1843), American public servant
- Peter Jay (born 1937), British broadcaster and diplomat
- Pierre Jay (1870–1949), American banker
- Ricky Jay (1948–2018), American magician
- Robert Jay (born 1959), English high court judge
- Samurai Jay (born 1998), Italian rapper and singer-songwriter
- Steve Jay (born 1951), American bassist
- Tony Jay (1933–2006), British actor
- Tyler Jay (born 1994), baseball player
- Vincent Jay (born 1985), French biathlete
- William Jay (minister) (1769–1853), British preacher
- William Jay (jurist) (1789–1858), American jurist
- William Jay (colonel) (died 1915), American army colonel
- William Jay Schieffelin (1866–1955), an American businessman and philanthropist
- William Jay Schieffelin Jr. (1891–1985), an American businessman and philanthropist

Jay is also a transliteration of the Korean surname Chae.

== See also ==
- Jay (disambiguation)
- Jay (given name)
- Jaye, which refers to people who have either the given name or surname Jaye
