= Schieffelin =

Schieffelin is a surname, and may refer to:

- Bambi Schieffelin, linguistic anthropologist at New York University in the department of Anthropology
- Bayard Schieffelin (1903–1989), American businessman, philanthropist, officer in the War Department during World War II, and director of the New York Public Library
- Bradhurst Schieffelin (1824–1909), American political activist during the Civil War, who later became a member of the People's Party
- Ed Schieffelin (1847–1897), Indian scout and prospector who discovered silver in the Arizona Territory, which led to the founding of Tombstone, Arizona
- Eugene Schieffelin (1827–1906), responsible for introducing the starling (Sturnus vulgaris) to North America
- George Richard Schieffelin (1836–1910), American lawyer
- Hannah Lawrence Schieffelin (1758–1838), American political poet
- Henry Hamilton Schieffelin (1783–1865), American businessman and lawyer
- Henry Maunsell Schieffelin (1808–1890), American businessman, philanthropist and consul general in Liberia
- Ian Schieffelin (born 2003), American basketball and football player
- Jacob Schieffelin (1757–1835), American loyalist, merchant, landowner and philanthropist
- John Jay Schieffelin (1897–1987), American rear admiral and executive director of the English-Speaking Union
- Maunsell Schieffelin Crosby (1887–1931), American ornithologist
- Samuel Schieffelin (1811–1900), American author of religious tracts
- William Henry Schieffelin (1836–1885), American businessman and Union Army cavalry officer in the American Civil War
- William Jay Schieffelin (1866–1955), American businessman, philanthropist, and president of the Citizens Union (New York City)
- William Jay Schieffelin Jr. (1891–1985), American businessman and philanthropist
