= William Jay Schieffelin =

American businessman and philanthropist

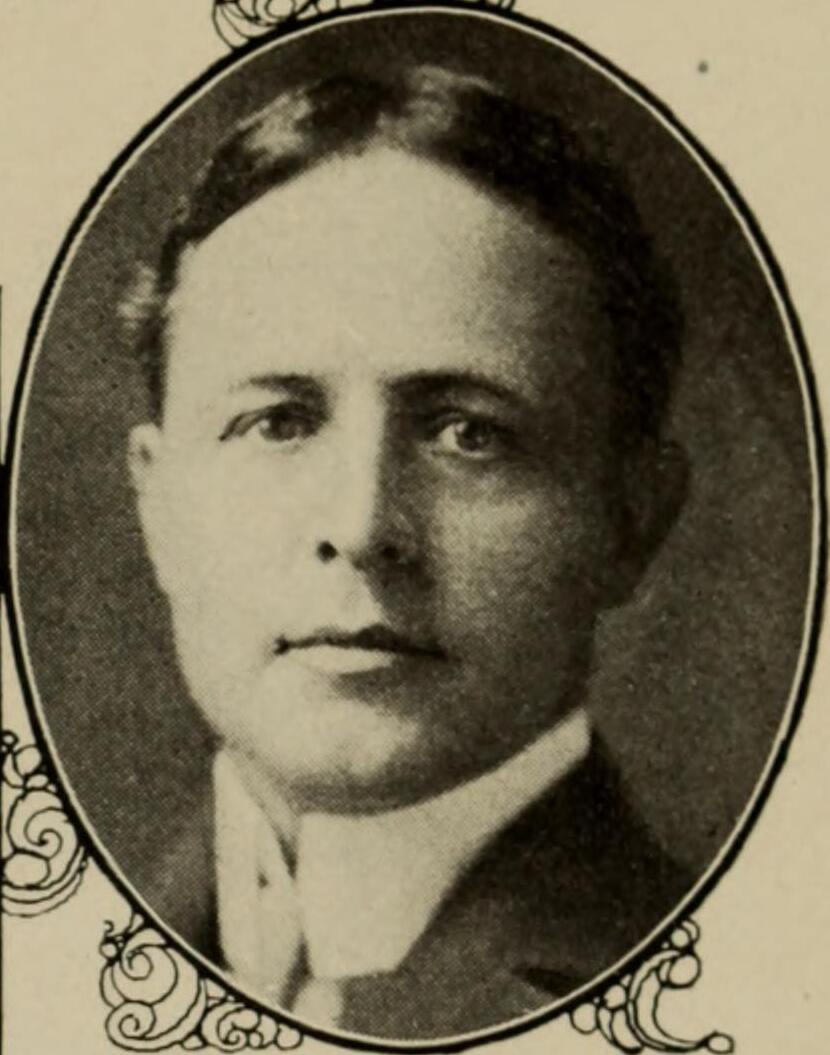
- Schieffelin c. 1915
- Born: April 14, 1866; New York City, New York, U.S.
- Died: April 29, 1955 (aged 89); New York City, New York, U.S.
- Burial place: Vanderbilt Family Cemetery and Mausoleum
- Education: Columbia School of Mines (1887)
- Spouse(s): Maria Louise Shepard, 1891
- Children: 9, including William Jr., John and Bayard
- Parent(s): William Henry Schieffelin; Mary Jay
- Relatives: Jay family Schieffelin family Vanderbilt family

William Jay Schieffelin (April 14, 1866 – April 29, 1955), was an American businessman, philanthropist, and president of the Citizens Union (New York City).

Schieffelin joined the good government movement in New York City in the 1890s, and was active in the city's politics for more than thirty years, fighting against corruption and for the preservation of Central Park.

Schieffelin was a strong advocate for the rights and social progress of African Americans, women's suffrage, and the improvement of working conditions in factories.

Schieffelin was a supporter of World federalism and influenced U.S. foreign policy from the beginning of World War I to the end of World War II. He was a member of the League to Enforce Peace group since 1915. Schieffelin was disappointed that the United States never joined the League of Nations after World War I. As chairman of the New York State Committee for World Federation, Schieffelin launched a campaign in 1943 that resulted in a resolution in the New York State Legislature declaring that only an international organization of all nations could lead to lasting peace. The resolution supported the United States' efforts to join the United Nations after World War II.

Schieffelin sided with interventionism during World War II. At a meeting organized by France Forever in 1940, Schieffelin said that the U.S. should act more decisively against Japan and Nazi Germany. He supported Wendell Willkie as Republican nominee for president in 1940, and he supported incumbent Democratic president Franklin D. Roosevelt during the 1944 presidential election.

== Early life ==
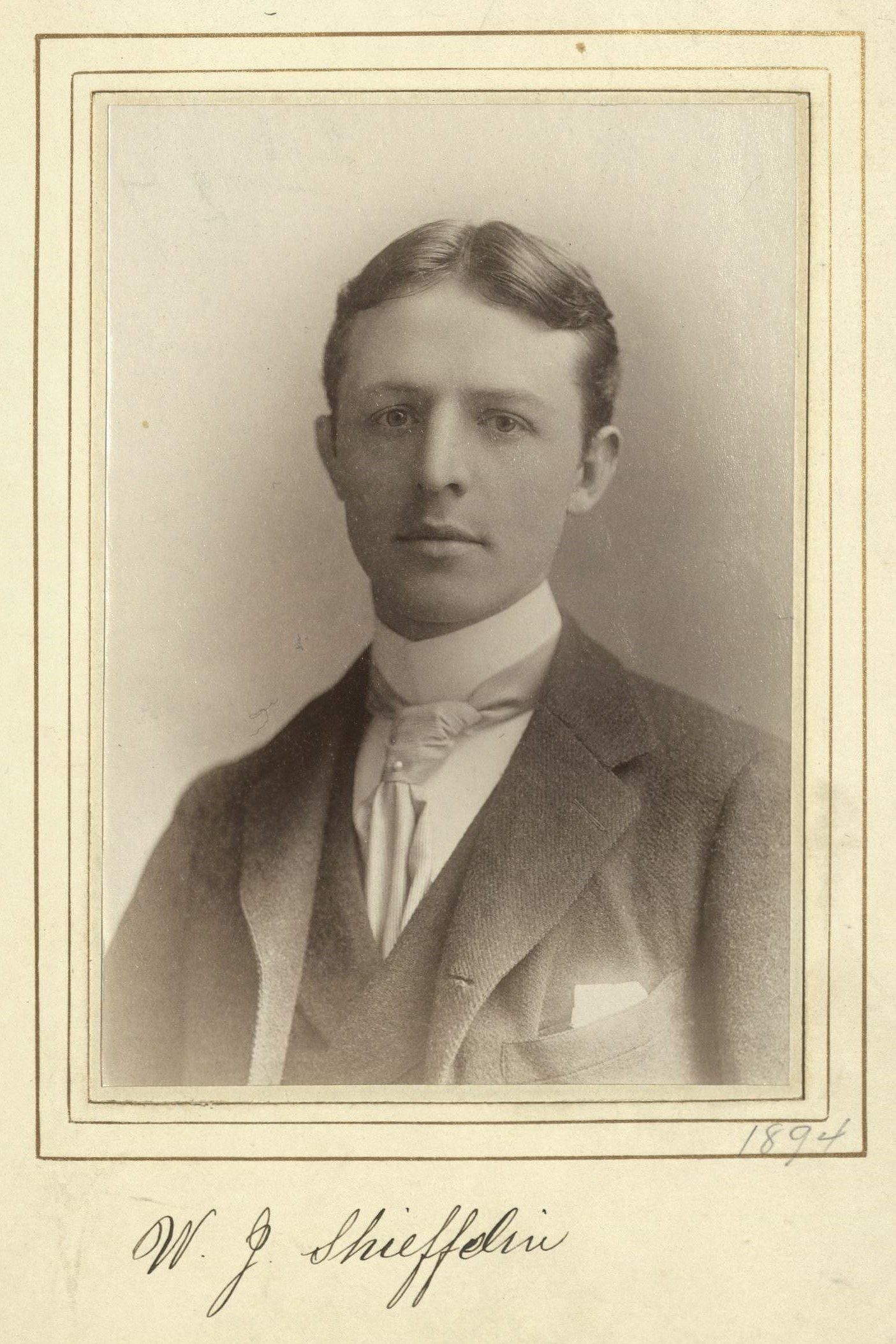
Schieffelin in 1894, aged 27.

William Jay Schieffelin was the first son of William Henry Schieffelin and Mary Jay Schieffelin.

William’s mother was the daughter of John Jay, who was the grandson of John Jay. His paternal ancestors were Jacob Schieffelin and Hannah Lawrence Schieffelin.

== Education ==
William Jay Schieffelin attended Trinity School in Manhattan.

Schieffelin attended the Columbia School of Mines, where he received his Ph.B. in 1887 and became a member of Phi Beta Kappa. At Columbia University, he studied chemistry with Professor Charles F. Chandler.

Schieffelin was sent to Germany for postgraduate studies and a doctorate. He studied for two years at the Ludwig-Maximilians-Universität München with Professor von Baeyer and received his Ph.D. in chemistry cum laude in 1889.

== Marriage and family ==
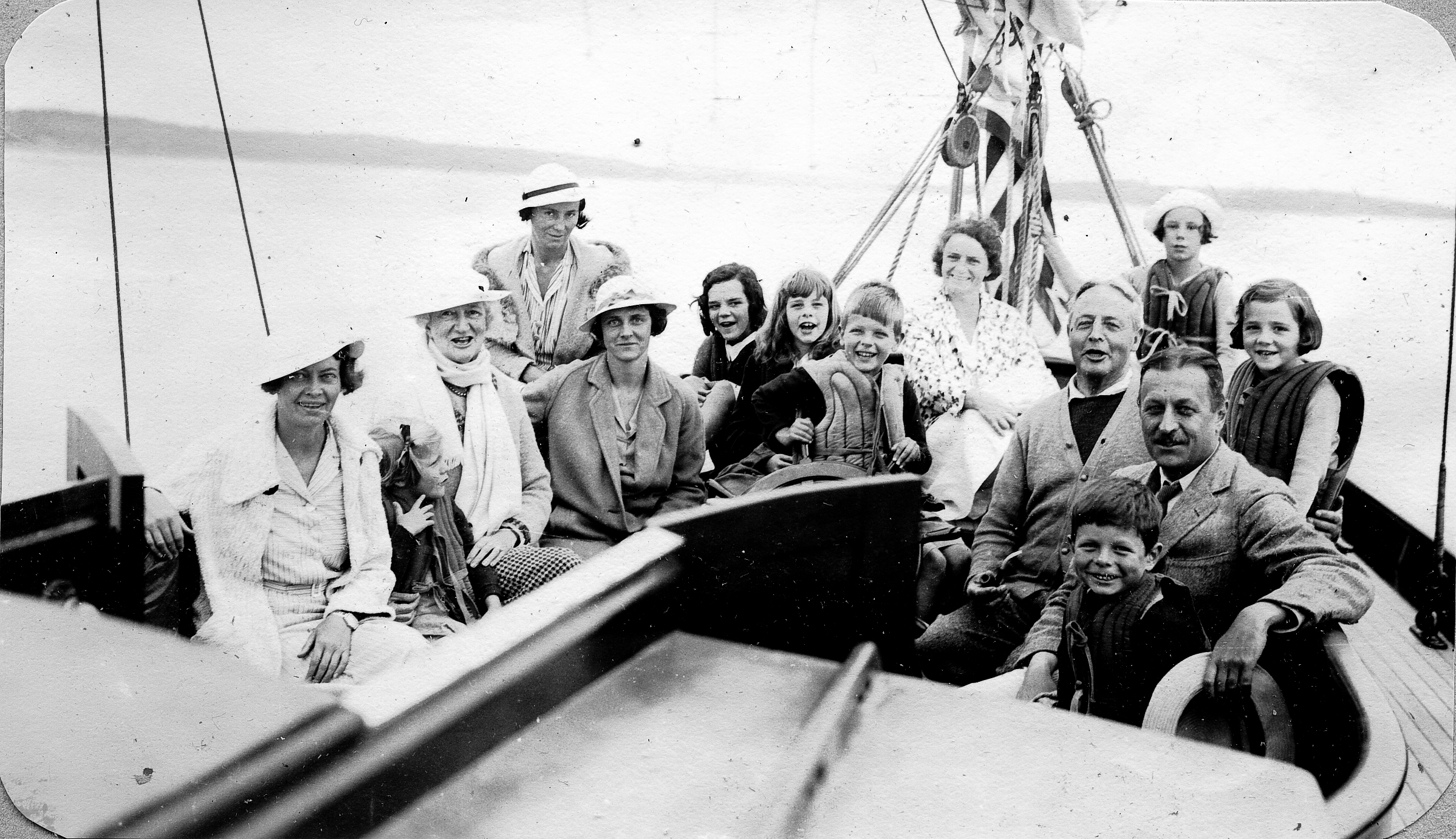
The Schieffelin family sailing c. 1910.

William Jay Schieffelin married Maria Louise Shepard, eldest daughter of Margaret Louisa Vanderbilt Shepard and Elliott Fitch Shepard, in 1891. The wedding of Maria Louise and William was a highly social event and reflected the splendor of the Gilded Age. The wedding took place at the Fifth Avenue Presbyterian Church and in the grand picture gallery of William Vanderbilt’s double villa at Fifth Avenue.

The couple had nine children: William Jay, Margaret Louisa, Mary Jay, John Jay, Louise, Bayard, Elliott, Barbara, and Henry.

The Schieffelin family lived at 5 East 66th Street in Manhattan (the building has been owned by the Lotos Club since 1947) and moved to 620 Park Avenue in 1925. They also owned an estate in Bar Harbor and on the Schieffelin Point peninsula in Maine called Tranquility Farm.

== Military service ==
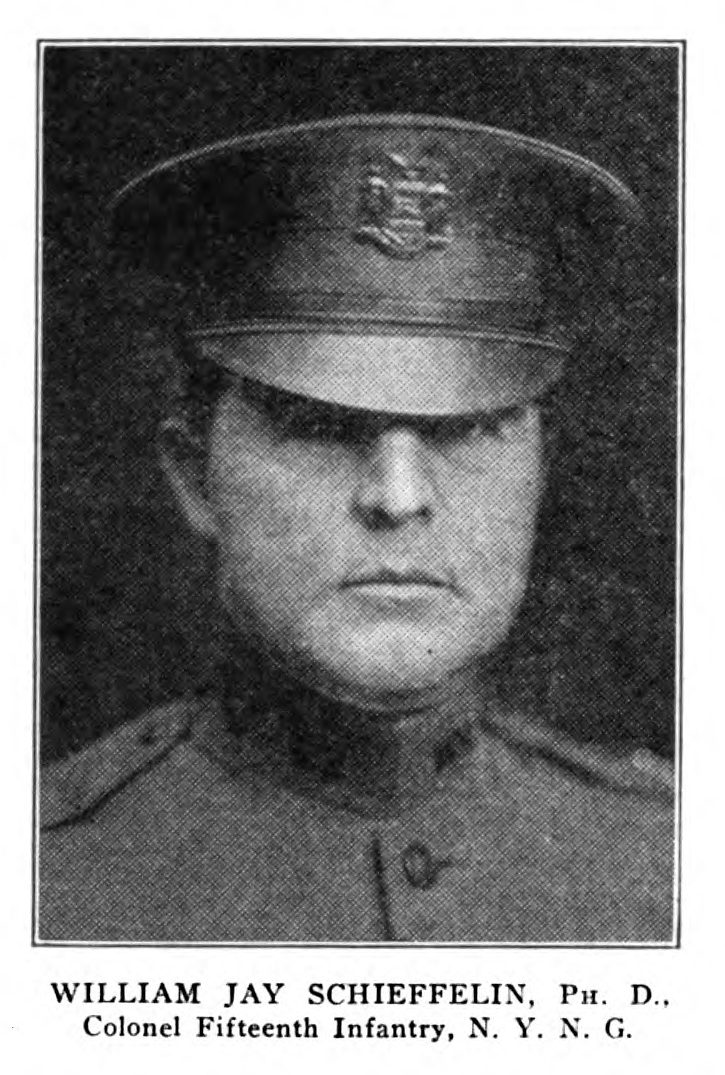
Schieffelin as Colonel of the 15th New York National Guard Regiment c. 1919

During the Spanish-American War in 1898, William Jay Schieffelin served as a volunteer captain and regimental adjutant of the 12th Regiment of the National Guard.

In 1898 President McKinley called for volunteers for the war with Spain. In August 1898, William Jay Schieffelin served as senior aide on the staff of General Peter Conover Hains. Initially, General Hains' brigade was ordered to board a ship to Cuba, but then the order changed and the brigade was on a transport ship to Puerto Rico.

On August 13, 1898, General Miles had ordered an advance against the Spanish forces entrenched in Cayey, Puerto Rico. General Hains commanded his column and Schieffelin had special duties during this operation. The battle was called off after the announcement of the armistice between the United States and Spain.

When he was in Puerto Rico, Schieffelin was affected by the Army beef scandal, because the troops in the field were supplied with rancid canned meat. His weight decreased by 50 pounds, and it took him months to regain his strength after the war.

During World War I, in 1918, Governor Whitman appointed Schieffelin Colonel of the 15th New York Infantry, the (mainly) African American replacement regiment of Colonel William Hayward, 369th Infantry Regiment of the U.S. Army, which served glorious service with the American Expeditionary Forces in France, where the entire regiment was awarded the Croix de Guerre. The 369th Infantry Regiment was commonly known as the Harlem Hellfighters.

Schieffelin was involved in organizing the 1919 Memorial Day parade. He had recruited 800 men and was presiding over an officers' meeting when he was given orders for the parade. He arranged for the 15th Infantry Regiment to be second in line for the parade, and it marched to cheers up Riverside Drive, marched to Central Park and finally marched through Harlem.

== Schieffelin & Co ==
Back in Manhattan, William Jay Schieffelin had been a partner in Schieffelin & Co since 1890, its vice president since 1903, its president 1906–1923 and its chairman of board 1923–1929. He managed Schieffelin & Co in the 5th generation after Jacob Schieffelin (1757–1835), who founded the company in 1794 (then Lawrence & Schieffelin, Pharma-Trade, at 195 Pearl Street in Manhattan). Schieffelin & Co was America's longest-running pharmaceutical business.

In 1889, William Jay Schieffelin began working at Schieffelin & Co, where he was involved in the chemical analysis of opium and coca leaves. At the time, cocaine was in high demand for medicinal purposes.

== City Reform Club, City Club of New York, and Citizens Union ==
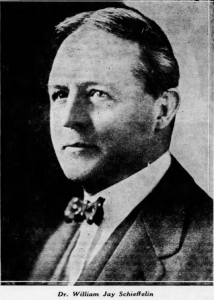
Schieffelin in 1925.

When William Jay Schieffelin returned from Europe in 1889, his cousin John Jay Chapman told him to join the City Reform Club. Schieffelin joined the group and met regularly with John Jay Chapman, Henry L. Stimson, Charles Bernheimer, and other members. Sometime they asked Robert Fulton Cutting for advice.

The City Club was founded in 1892 through the efforts of Edmond Kelly and Robert Fulton Cutting and the members of the City Reform Club. Schieffelin chaired the membership committee and was able to recruit 400 members. The club elected the distinguished attorney James C. Carter as its first president. City Club members and other independent leaders formed Good Government Clubs in many boroughs.

In 1894, a committee was appointed with Senator Lexow as chairman. Schieffelin considered the Lexow investigation a milestone in the fight against corruption in New York City. The Lexow Committee's report, in his opinion, clearly showed the system of corruption and bribery of Tammany and the police department that existed at that time.

In 1894, the Committee of Seventy, appointed by the Chamber of Commerce, was organized and prompted by a group of leading merchants and financiers in New York City, including Alexander Orr, Morris Jesup, John S. Kennedy, and Gustav H. Schwab. They appointed Schieffelin to the committee and to the executive committee. The committee recommended William L. Strong for mayor and had him nominated by the Republican organization. That same year, mayor Strong appointed Theodore Roosevelt as New York City Police Commissioner.

In 1896, mayor Strong appointed William Jay Schieffelin as Civil Service Commissioner in New York City.

Schieffelin knew George McAneny when he was quite young. McAneny was Secretary of the New York Civil Service Reform League. The New York Civil Service Reform League persuaded mayor Strong to appoint William Jay Schieffelin as Civil Service Commissioner. George McAneny was the one who suggested Schieffelin’s appointment as Commissioner.

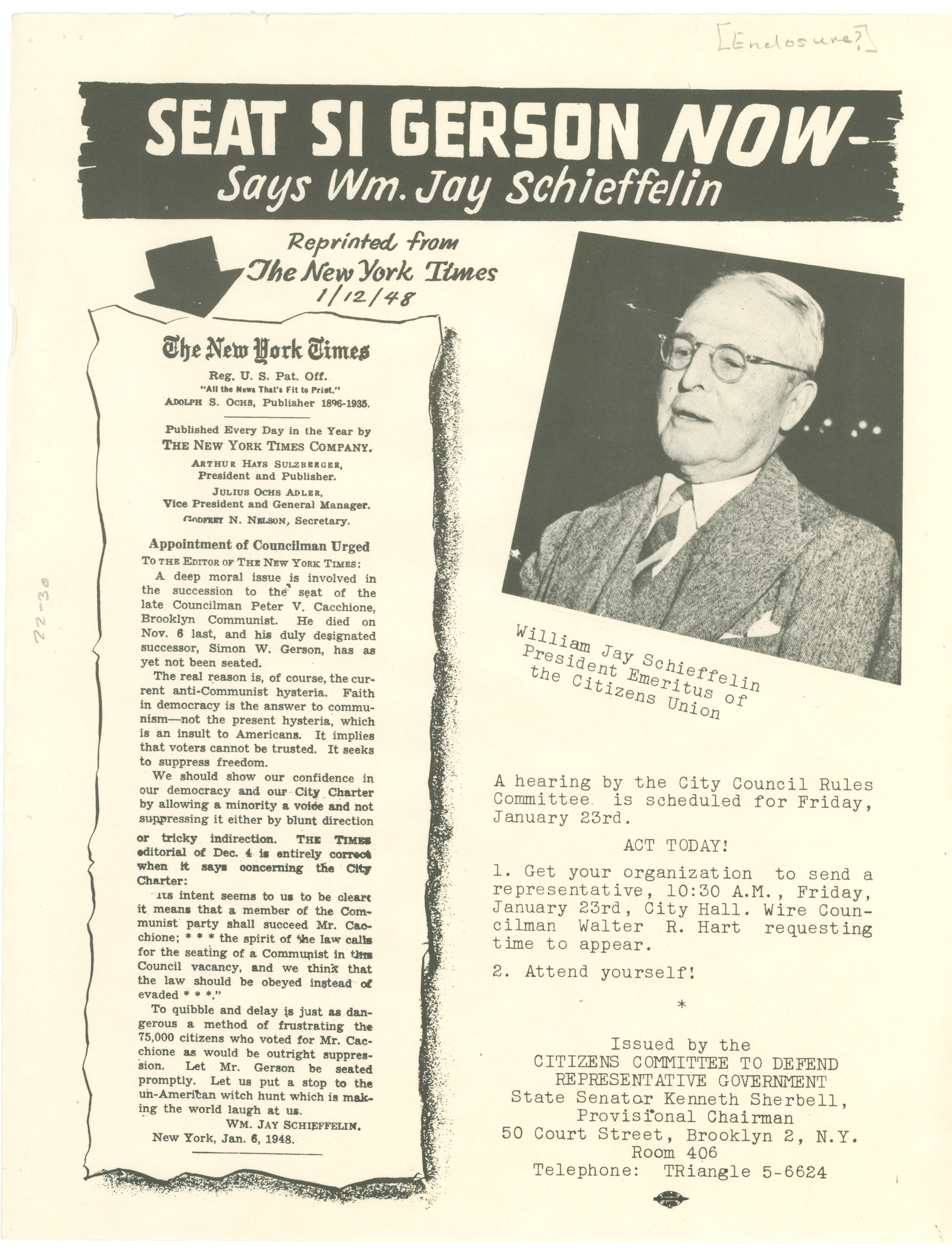
"Seat Si Gerson now says Wm. Jay Schieffelin," 1948

In 1897, City Club helped found Citizens Union, of which William Jay Schieffelin served as president from 1908 to 1941. The club's mission was not only to fight corruption, but also to generally improve the quality of life in the city, particularly the preservation of Central Park. In 1924, Schieffelin proposed banning cars from Central Park. Schieffelin organized the Committee of One Thousand to remove mayor James J. Walker from office. His complaints against mayor Walker at the hearings led to the mayor’s resignation.

Schieffelin knew Carl Schurz very well and admired him. In the 1890s he visited Carl Schurz, and they talked about Good Government topics.

Schieffelin knew J. Pierpont Morgan very well, because both were active in St. George Church.

The election of Fiorello La Guardia as the Fusion candidate for mayor was the result of a conference held in the Bar Association building between the Republican leaders and the independent citizens represented by Samuel Seabury, C. C. Burlingham, A. A. Berle, and others. William Jay Schieffelin attended the conference as a representative of the Citizens Union.

== Committee of One Thousand (1930) ==
William Jay Schieffelin knew Al Smith very well. In 1926, he had a dispute with Al Smith over alleged corruption in the Health Department. The case later led to the Seabury Investigation.

The Citizens Union realized that the Walker administration was ripe for an investigation by a legislative committee. To generate public pressure for such an action, Schieffelin organized the so-called “Committee of One Thousand,” which called for the investigation and demanded that Samuel Seabury be named as counsel for the investigating committee. The legislature granted the request and appointed State Senator Hofstadter as Chairman.

Governor Franklin D. Roosevelt summoned mayor Walker to a hearing in Albany. Schieffelin attended the hearing as a complainant citizen and judge Seabury appeared as prosecutor. After the hearing, mayor Walker resigned.

== Volunteer Christian Committee to Boycott Nazi Germany ==
On January 9, 1939, 60 prominent Americans formed the Volunteer Christian Committee to Boycott Nazi Germany (VCC) under the leadership of Christopher Temple Emmet, Jr. (secretary) and William Jay Schieffelin (chairman). The committee campaigned for many months, primarily through newspaper advertisements, calling on Christians to strengthen the boycott already imposed by American Jews. In March 1939, Schieffelin asked William Green to link up the American Federation of Labor with the VCC to strengthen America's boycott movement against the Nazis. Green, however, refused. Schieffelin later merged his group with others and formed the Coordinated Boycott Committee, which continued its work until shortly before America's entry into World War II.

== France Forever ==
On December 20, 1940, France Forever called a public meeting at Carnegie Hall, and William Jay Schieffelin was asked to speak as a representative of the Huguenot Society. In his speech, Schieffelin said: ”It is high time to discard that slogan ’Short of War’ which was put in political platforms to placate the isolationists and the pacifists. It is a cowardly slogan encouraging Hitler and Japan, saying we will not stand up like men and fight, even when our National safety and most cherished beliefs are threatened. We must stop Hitler ’Short of nothing’.”

== League to Enforce Peace (1915), Federal Union, Inc. (1941), World Federation (1943) ==
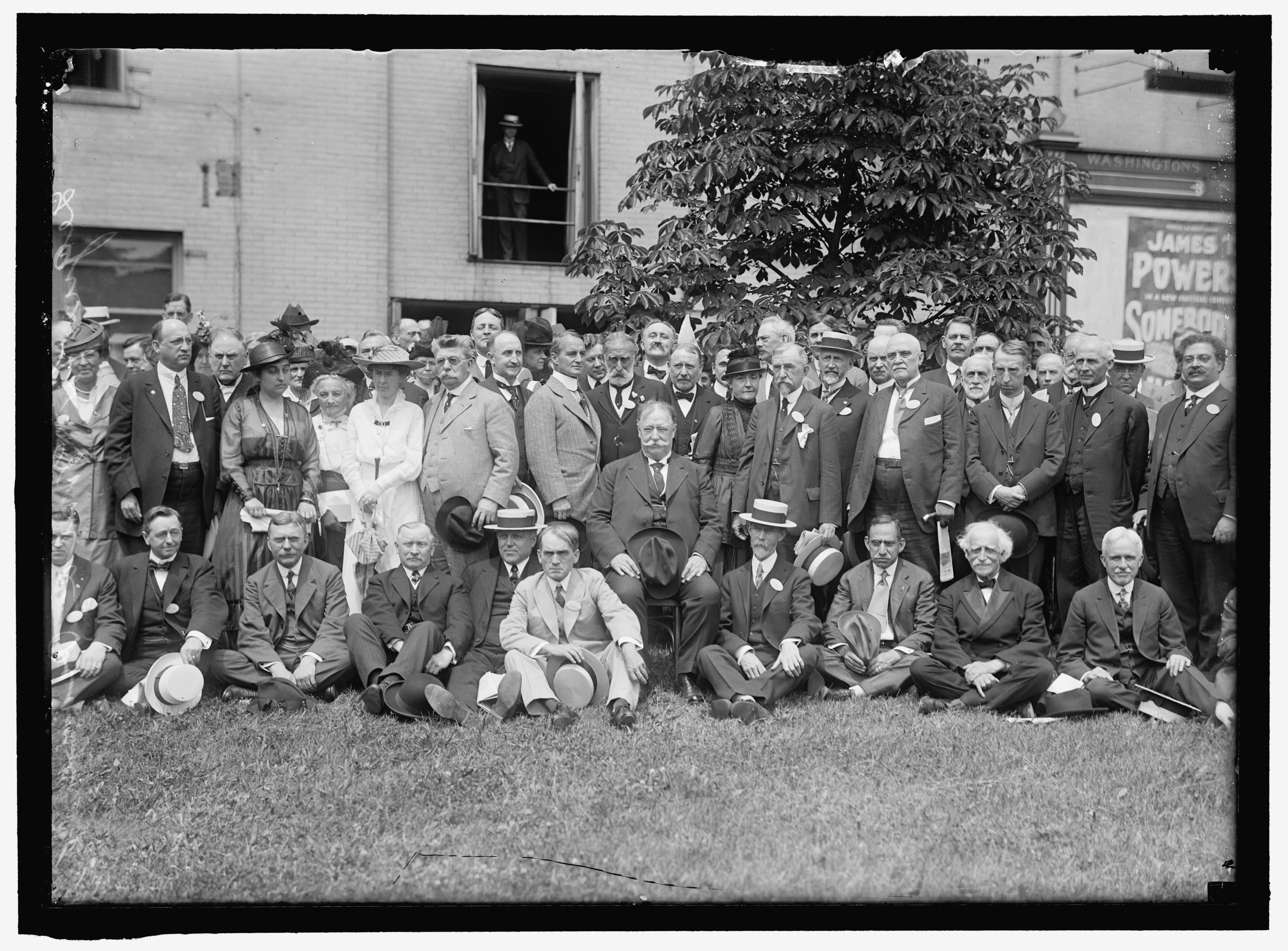
Members of the League to Enforce Peace, 1916.

Clarence Streit’s book "Union Now" impressed the public when it was published in 1939. Therefore, the Federal Union Inc., of which William Jay Schieffelin was New York’s chairman, hosted a dinner for the Uniting States of the World at the Waldorf Astoria on January 22, 1941.

For Schieffelin, this was the culmination of a movement called the League to Enforce Peace, founded in 1915 and headed by former President William Howard Taft. President Lowell of Harvard chaired the executive committee, which was made up of the chairmen of the various state committees. William Jay Schieffelin was chairman of the New York State committee.

According to William Jay Schieffelin the United States should have joined the League of Nations, but did not because President Wilson, for reasons Schieffelin could not understand, suddenly opposed the membership plans presented to the Senate by former President Taft. Schieffelin said it was "tragic" that the United States never joined the League of Nations.

During the campaign for world government, Schieffelin hosted a gathering honoring Robert Lee Humber, a co-founder of the United World Federalists organization, which advocated a united world modeled on the United States. In 1943, the New York State Committee for World Federation was formed, and Schieffelin was appointed chairman. Schieffelin launched a campaign that same year that resulted in a resolution in the New York State Legislature stating that only an international organization of all nations could bring about lasting world peace. The resolution supported the United States' efforts to join the United Nations after World War II.

== African Americans ==
William Jay Schieffelin was an advocate for the rights and social progress of African Americans. He was president of the New York Armstrong Association (named after Samuel Chapman Armstrong). The Association was formed as a vehicle to support the Hampton Normal and Agricultural Institute, an all-black agricultural and vocational institution in Hampton, Virginia and to engage with matters of African American uplift. He also served on the Board of Trustees of the Hampton Institute. Simultaneously, Schieffelin served forty years on the Tuskegee Board, which he chaired for twenty-three years. Schieffelin opened the Tuskegee Institute Silver Anniversary Lecture at Carnegie Hall in 1906. He met Booker T. Washington and George Washington Carver. Schieffelin was at Tuskegee in Alabama when the Scottsboro Case happened. When the Scottsboro Defense Committee was formed, he was appointed treasurer.

Schieffelin knew Andrew Carnegie very well. They were both supporters of the Tuskegee University and African American education.

Schieffelin knew Woodrow Wilson. At the outbreak of World War I, Schieffelin offered to raise an African American cavalry regiment and become its colonel. However, Schieffelin's offer was rejected by President Wilson. As a result, Governor Whitman appointed Schieffelin colonel of the 15th New York Infantry Regiment (an African American regiment of the New York Army National Guard).

== Politics and connections with the Roosevelt family ==
In 1906 William Jay Schieffelin went to the White House at Theodore Roosevelt’s invitation to discuss race relations. He disagreed with the way Roosevelt treated the African American soldiers at Brownsville.

In 1909 Theodore Roosevelt sent a letter to William Jay Schieffelin in which he wrote: “Did I tell you how much Sir Harry Johnston admired your family? You and yours are pretty good Americans.”

Franklin D. Roosevelt’s mother, Sara Roosevelt, was a good friend of Schieffelin's mother, Mary Jay Schieffelin. The Roosevelts lived nearby on East 65th Street. Sara Roosevelt and Schieffelin and his wife went to meetings or social gatherings.

William Jay Schieffelin had frequently met Eleanor Roosevelt at the Interrelation meetings. He had known Mrs. Franklin D. Roosevelt for about thirty years and admired her commitment to humanity.

Schieffelin knew Wendell Willkie. The 1944 Republican National Convention nominated Thomas E. Dewey for president, but according to William Jay Schieffelin, there had been some irregularities before the nomination.

William Jay Schieffelin was a (Lincoln) Republican, but he came out in support of Franklin D. Roosevelt and voted for him on the American Labor Party Line in 1944.

== New York College of Pharmacy ==
At the age of 17, William Jay Schieffelin went to Columbia University to study chemistry. He took the chemistry course taught by Professor Charles F. Chandler. Professor Chandler had advised Schieffelin's parents to send him to Germany in 1887 for postgraduate studies and a doctorate.

Schieffelin's great-grandfather, Henry Hamilton Schieffelin, was a co-founder of the New York College of Pharmacy and its first president. In the 1890s, William Jay Schieffelin became a member of the board of trustees and later honorary president of the New York College of Pharmacy. The College of Pharmacy became part of Columbia University.

== Drug Act of 1906 ==
In 1906, Congress established a committee to investigate why the United States had a problem with addictive substances in medicines and pharmaceutical products and how this problem could be avoided. William Jay Schieffelin was invited by Congress to testify as an expert and help clarify the matter. The testimony of Schieffelin and other experts led to a tightening of drug laws in the United States. The Pure Food and Drug Act was passed by Congress in 1906.

== American Leprosy Missions; Schieffelin Institute of Health in Karigiri, India ==
In 1909 William Jay Schieffelin became chairman of the Committee of the American Mission to Lepers.

In 1955 the Schieffelin Leprosy Research and Training Center was opened in Karigiri, India, named in honor of William Jay Schieffelin, the chairman of the American Leprosy Missions board of governors from 1909 to 1941.

== Joint Board of Sanitary Control ==
As chairman of the Citizens Union, William Jay Schieffelin had many opportunities to advocate for the social needs of New York citizens. One of these was as chairman of the Joint Board of Sanitary Control in the Needlework Industry. In 1910, the cloakmakers, numbering nearly 80,000 men and women, went on strike against the intolerable conditions in the sweatshops. Their leader was Joseph Barondess. Schieffelin presided over a mass meeting in the Cooper Union Great Hall. An agreement called the Protocol was drawn up by Louis D. Brandeis and Meyer London. A board called the Joint Board of Sanitary Control was then formed to adopt standards to protect the health and safety of workers.

== Death ==
William Jay Schieffelin died on April 29, 1955, six years after his wife Maria Louise. Schieffelin was buried in the Vanderbilt Family Cemetery and Mausoleum.

== Committee work and social commitment ==
Schieffelin's social commitment extended to many associations and institutions:

- Vice President of the American Pharmaceutical Association
- Honorary President of the New York College of Pharmacy (Columbia University)
- Officer for the New York Society for the Suppression of Vice
- Vestryman in St. George’s Church on Stuyvesant Square
- Manager of the American Bible Society
- Member of the NAACP
- Board of Trustees of the Hampton Institute
- Board of Trustees of Tuskegee University
- President of the Armstrong Association
- Treasurer of the Defense Committee for the Scottsboro Boys
- Member of the City Reform Club (1889)
- Chairman of the Membership Committee of the City Club (1892)
- Member of the Century Association (1894–1955)
- Member of the Committee of Seventy (1894)
- Civil Service Commissioner in New York City (1896)
- Adjutant of the 12th New York Infantry, Spanish-American War (1898)
- President of the Chemists' Club, New York City (1906)
- President of the Citizens Union (1908–1941)
- President of the American Leprosy Missions (1909–1941)
- President of the National Wholesale Druggists Association (1910)
- Chairman of the Joint Board of Sanitary Control representing the public (1910)
- Chairman of the Executive Committee of the Committee of One Hundred on National Health (1911)
- Chairman of the New York State Committee of the League to Enforce Peace (1915)
- Colonel of the 15th New York Infantry (the 369th Infantry Regiment), World War I (1918)
- President of the Huguenot Society of America (1922–1947)
- Head of the Committee of One Thousand (1930)
- President of the Men’s League for Women’s Suffrage
- Chairman of the Christian Committee to Boycott Nazi Germany (1941)
- New York’s Chairman of the Federal Union, Inc. (1941)
- Chairman of the American Friends of Czechoslovakia (1942)
- Chairman of the New York State Committee For World Federation (1943)
- Sponsor of the Schieffelin Institute of Health - Research & Leprosy Center in Karigiri, India (1955)
- Fellow of the London Chemical Society
- Member of the American Chemical Society
- Member of the Society of Chemical Industry
