= Bayard Schieffelin =

American businessman and philanthropist

- Born: April 16, 1903; New York City, U.S.
- Died: April 6, 1989 (aged 85); Short Hills, New Jersey, U.S.
- Occupations: Businessman, philanthropist, government officer, librarian
- Spouse: Virginia Langdon Loomis
- Children: 4
- Parent: William Jay Schieffelin (father)
- Relatives: John Jay (ancestor)
- Awards: Legion of Merit

Bayard Schieffelin (New York City, April 16, 1903 – Short Hills, New Jersey, April 6, 1989), was an American businessman, philanthropist, officer in the War Department during World War II, and director of the New York Public Library (1950–1968).

== Early life ==
Bayard Schieffelin was the third son of William Jay Schieffelin and Maria Louise Shepard Schieffelin. He was born in Manhattan and grew up in the house on 5 East 66th Street (the building is owned by the Lotos Club since 1947).

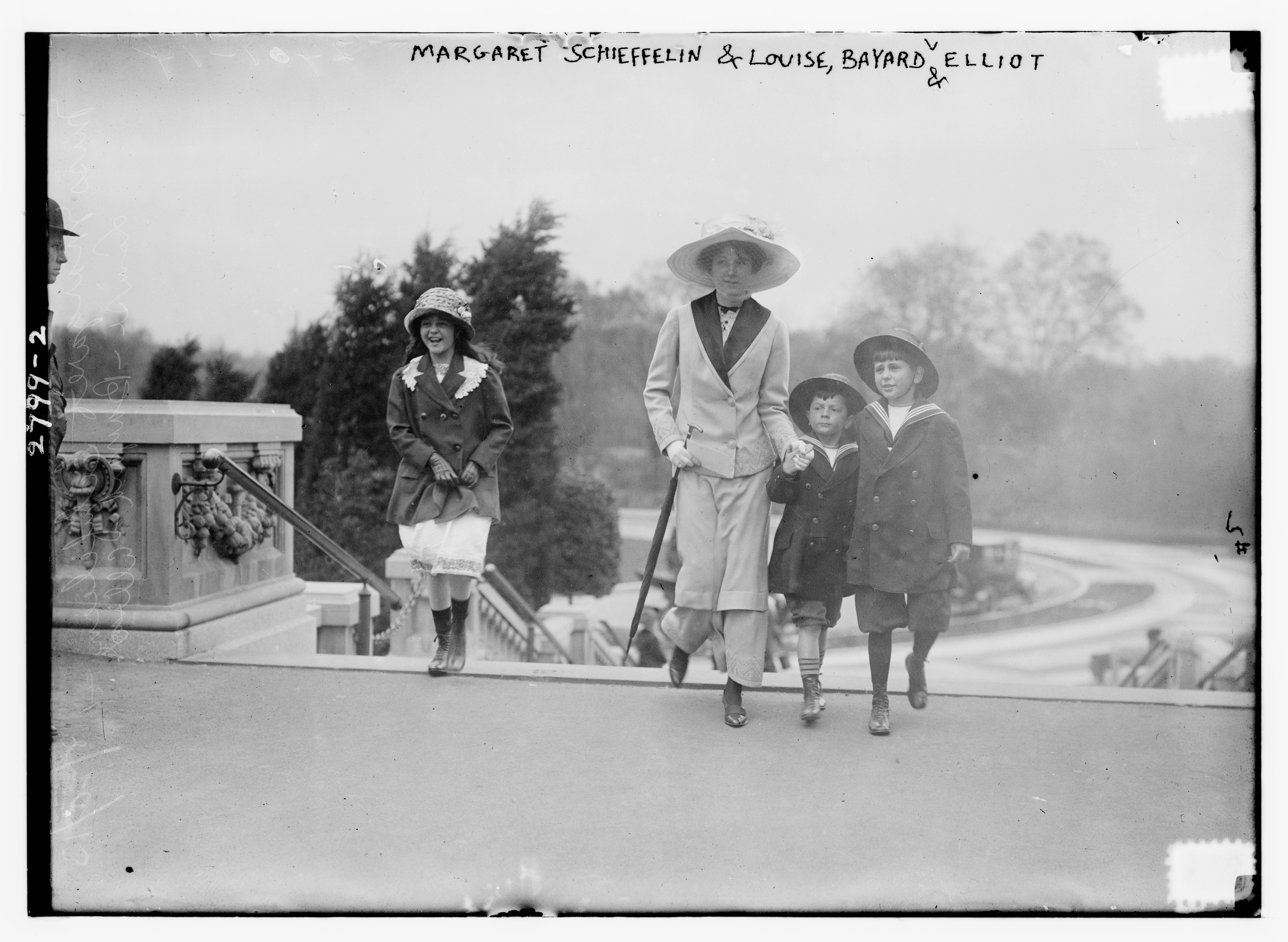
Bayard Schieffelin at the age of seven (1910) on the right.

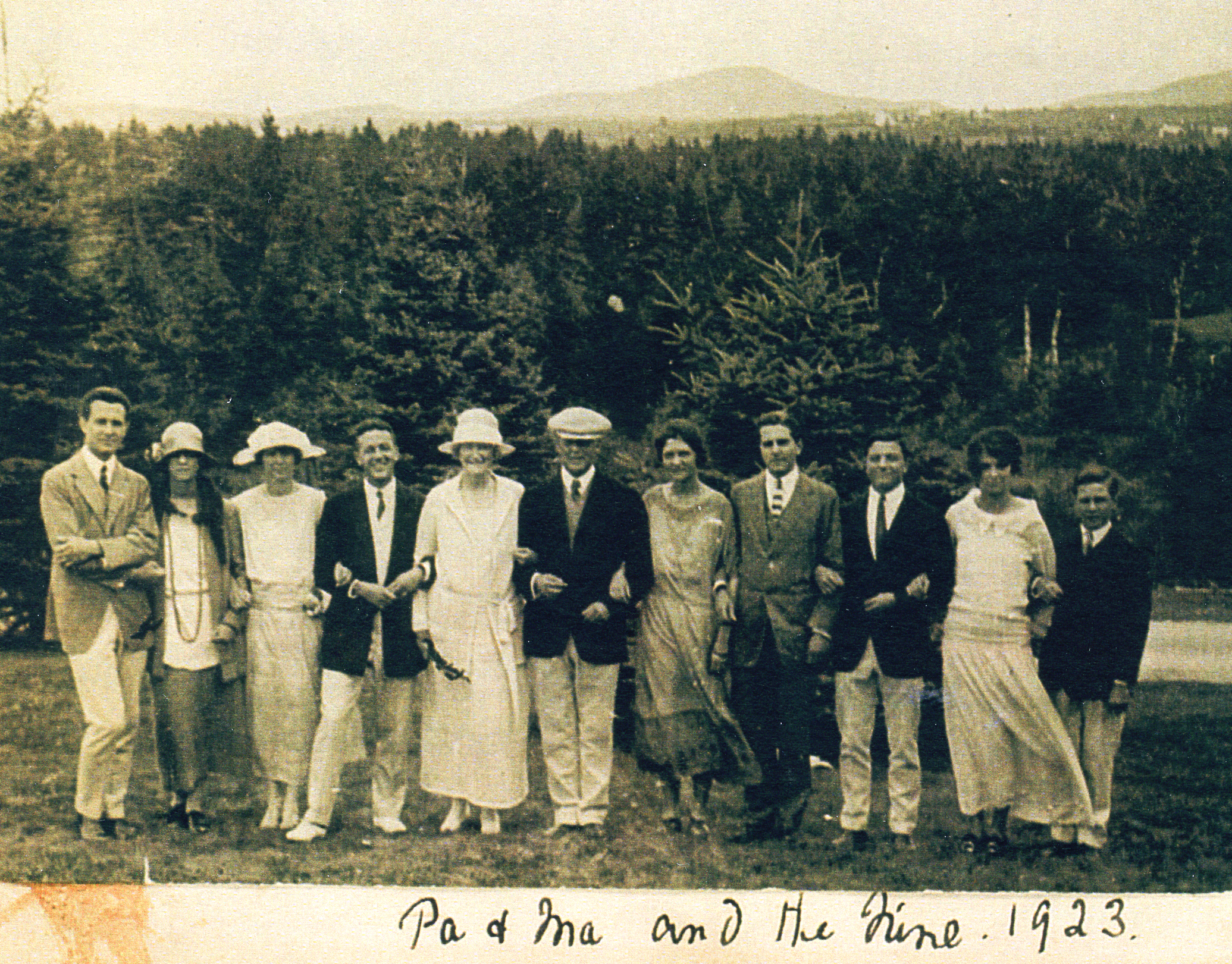
Bayard Schieffelin with his parents and eight siblings in 1923 (fourth person from the right).

Through his paternal ancestors Bayard Schieffelin was a descendant of John Jay, and through his maternal ancestors he was a member of the Vanderbilt family. His first name, Bayard, reminds of John Jay’s grandma Anna Maria Bayard Jay. The Bayard family were Huguenots who had fled from France, first to the Netherlands, and then to New York. The Bayards and Jays fled their oppression as Protestants in France, following the revocation of the Edict of Nantes by King Louis XIV in 1685.

== Personal life ==
Bayard Schieffelin married Virginia Langdon Loomis from New York in 1934. The couple had four children.

Virginia Langdon Loomis was the daughter of Edward Eugene Loomis and Julia Olivia Langdon Loomis.

== Career ==
Bayard Schieffelin graduated from Groton School and from Yale University in 1926.

From 1939, Schieffelin worked on the finance board of Schieffelin & Co in Manhattan.

During World War II Schieffelin worked in the War Department in Washington, DC, and received the Legion of Merit award. Schieffelin served as an Administrative Officer with the rank of Lt. Col. under Secretary of War Henry L. Stimson and Under Secretary of War Robert P. Patterson in the War Department (1940–1945).

Schieffelin was Director of the New York Public Library from 1950 to 1968.

== Committee work and social commitment ==
- Co-sponsor of the Langdon Schieffelin Fund for Bryn Mawr College in 1930
- Member of the Century Association (elected 1952)
- Trustee Vice President of Robert College in Istanbul, Turkey

== War Department (1940–1945) ==
Schieffelin’s work in the War Department was closely linked to Robert P. Patterson.

Years before World War II, Schieffelin met Patterson in Cold Spring, NY, because his eldest brother William Jay Schieffelin, Jr. was a close friend of Patterson.

One year before World War II, Patterson called Schieffelin to join the staff of the War Department in a civilian capacity. Schieffelin was appointed to the Tax Amortization Division, which had been established just a few months earlier.

The Tax Amortization Division was tasked with implementing the Tax Amortization Act, which allowed industrial companies to produce war goods tax-free. Therefore, the War Department issued so-called "Certificates of Necessity" to the companies, confirming that the goods they produced were needed for national defense.

Starting in spring of 1942, Schieffelin served for about a year as an officer in another department of the War Department. During that year, Schieffelin was the administrative officer of the Industrial Personnel Division of the Army Service Forces of the U.S. Army, directly under James P. Mitchell, in a division under General Brehon B. Somervell. During this time, Schieffelin also worked with General William S. Knudsen.

In 1942, Schieffelin was appointed Patterson’s administrative officer. During this time, Patterson, General Edward Samuel Greenbaum, and Schieffelin worked closely together and issued orders. Schieffelin’s duties as administrative officer were equivalent to those of an office manager in a headquarters with 140 employees.

In 1942, Schieffelin organized a short inspection trip for Patterson to Camp Butner. In addition to Patterson, Senator Truman and Professor Douglas Southall Freeman from Richmond, Virginia, also participated. On the return flight, the men discussed the Civil War. This conversation was not unintentional. At that time, there was a movement in Congress to establish a Congressional Committee for the Prosecution of the War under Truman’s leadership (the Truman Committee). The discussion was intended to illustrate what a calamity it had been for President Lincoln when a similar Congressional Committee was established.

After World War II, Patterson awarded the Legion of Merit to certain officers on his staff, including Schieffelin. Schieffelin got this award for his general services to the War Department.
