= Hemond =

Hemond is a surname. Notable people with the surname include:

- Harry Hemond, American engineer
- Roland Hemond (1929-2021), American baseball executive
- Scott Hemond (born 1965), American baseball player
