= Century Association =

Social club in New York City

The Century Association
- Century Association seal

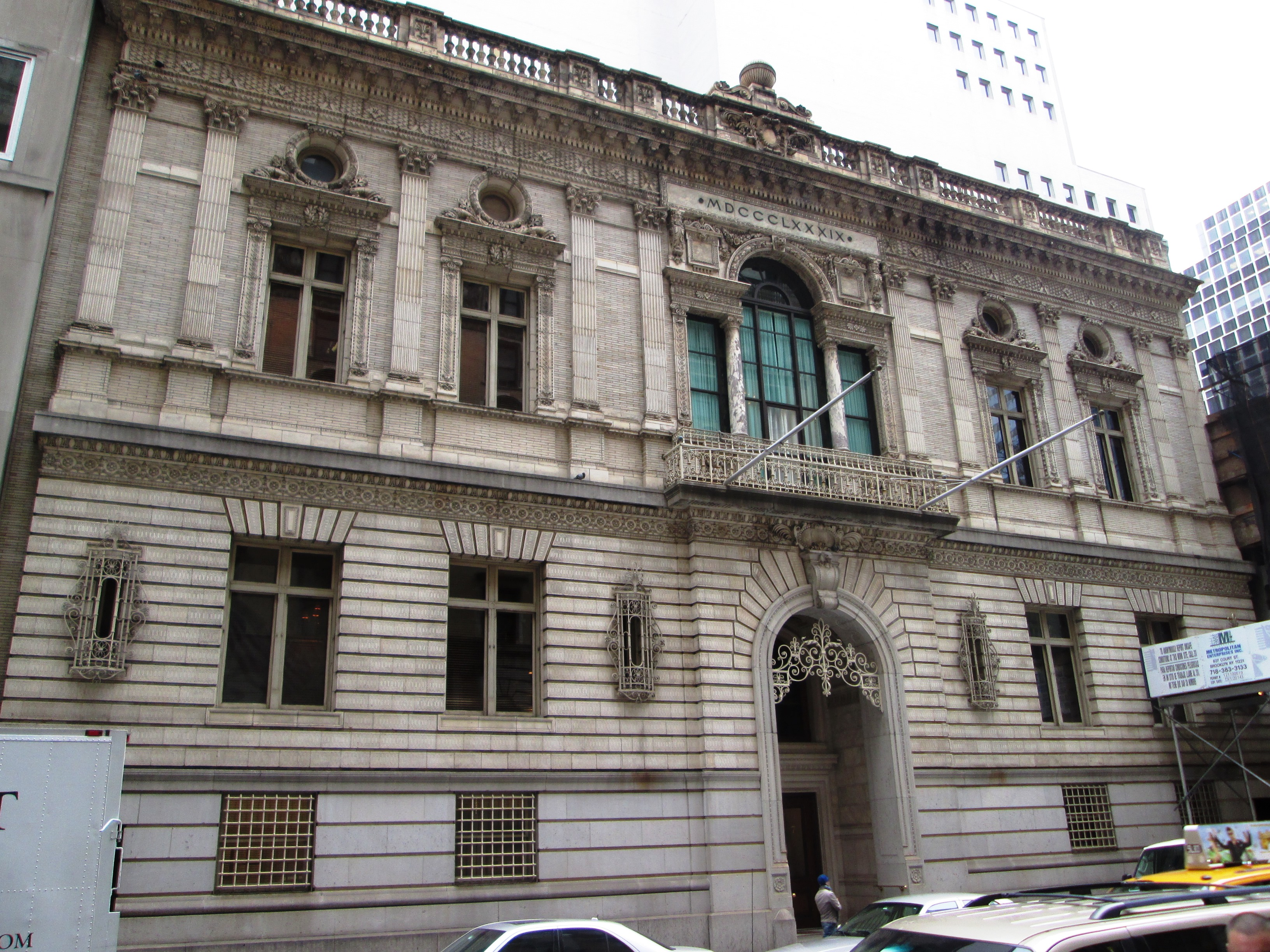
- Main facade
- Predecessor: Sketch Club
- Formation: January 13, 1847; 179 years ago
- Founded at: Rotunda, City Hall Park
- Type: Social club
- Tax ID no.: 13-0562370
- Location: 7 West 43rd St, Manhattan, New York City
- Members: 2,000
- President: Molly O'Neil Frank
- Website: www.thecentury.org
- Century Association Building
- U.S. National Register of Historic Places
- New York State Register of Historic Places
- New York City Landmark
- Coordinates: 40°45′16.5″N 73°58′51.5″W
- Built: 1889–1891
- Architect: McKim, Mead & White
- Architectural style: Palazzo style (Italian Renaissance Revival)
- NRHP reference No.: 82003369
- NYSRHP No.: 06101.000407
- NYCL No.: 0257

Significant dates
- Added to NRHP: July 15, 1982
- Designated NYSRHP: June 11, 1982
- Designated NYCL: January 11, 1967

The Century Association is a private social, arts, and dining club in New York City, founded in 1847. Its clubhouse is located at 7 West 43rd Street near Fifth Avenue in Midtown Manhattan. It is primarily a club for men and women with distinction in literature or the arts. The Century Association was founded by members of New York's Sketch Club; preceding clubs also included the National Academy of Design, the Bread and Cheese Club, and the Column. Traditionally a men's club, women first became active in club life in the early 1900s; the organization began admitting women as members in 1988.

Named after the first 100 people proposed as members, the first meeting on January 13, 1847, created the club known as the Century; it was incorporated in 1857. It was first housed at 495 Broadway in Lower Manhattan; the club gradually moved uptown, leading to the club's construction of its current location in 1899. During the Civil War, it became headquarters to the U.S. Sanitary Commission. One hundred thirty-four Centurions served in World War I; 110 served in World War II.

The clubhouse, a five-story Palazzo style building, was designed by McKim, Mead & White and built from 1889 to 1891. It became a New York City Landmark in 1967 and was added to the National Register of Historic Places in 1982. It was extensively renovated in the early 1990s, with a fifth floor and terrace constructed in 2009.

Members of the club have included artists and writers William Cullen Bryant, Frederic Church, Asher B. Durand, John La Farge, Winslow Homer, Paul Manship, Augustus Saint-Gaudens, Louis Comfort Tiffany, Jules Turcas, John Quincy Adams Ward, and J. Alden Weir. Architect members have included Calvert Vaux, Carrère and Hastings, Frederick Law Olmsted, James Renwick Jr., McKim, Mead & White, and York and Sawyer. Members are known for other endeavors, including eight Presidents of the United States, ten US Supreme Court justices, 43 Members of the Cabinet, 29 Nobel Prize laureates, members of the Rockefeller, Vanderbilt, Roosevelt, Jay, Schieffelin and Astor families, and noted individuals like Dan Beard, J. P. Morgan, Samuel Morse, and Anson Phelps Stokes.

The club has status under 501(c)(7) Social and Recreation Clubs; in 2024 it reported $11,994,497 in total revenue and total assets of $38,873,917. The separate Century Association Archives Foundation is a 501(c)(3) Public Charity; in 2024 it had total revenue of $140,365 and total assets of $744,346.

== History ==
The Century Association resulted from the merger of two earlier private clubs for men "of similar social standing or shared interests." The Sketch Club had focused on literature and the arts, while the Column Club had been a Columbia University alumni organization. The initial invitation for the combined club was sent to one hundred men, which became the basis for the name "The Century", later slightly altered to the Century Association.

The club rented a variety of temporary locations in Manhattan, gravitating to the area around Union Square and Madison Square. Among these locations were over Del Vecchio's picture store at 495 Broadway, 435 Broome Street, over a millinery shop at 575 Broadway, and 24 Clinton Place (later redesignated 46 East 8th Street). Rapid growth in membership to 250 led the club to incorporate and purchase a permanent location in 1857.

=== 1900s to 1930s ===
The League to Enforce Peace was created in 1915, proposed at the Century by Theodore Marburg. The organization continued hosting dinners there in 1916 and 1917.

The US entered its Prohibition era in 1919 with the enactment of the Volstead Act. One year later, club president Elihu Root conveyed to the US Supreme Court that should the court find the act constitutional, Congress would have no limitations, changing the nature of the federal government.

At the start of the Prohibition era, a pantry was converted into the club's bar. Alcohol was not sold or served in accordance with the Volstead Act although members did store alcohol in their own lockers, and could serve themselves from the bar. Additional lockers were installed in this period to accommodate the increased use. After Prohibition, the first bottle served there was an Italian Swiss Colony-brand bottle, signed by nine Centurions. The bottle had been kept at the bar since then.

By 1928, with the country still prohibiting alcohol, the Centurion Herbert Hoover was elected as the next President of the United States. No Centurions reportedly voted for him due to his support of Prohibition, though members were still cordial to Hoover, as club members have always held a traditional agreement to keep business and political affairs outside of the club.

In 1929, the Great Depression began to affect all of America, triggered by the Wall Street Crash of 1929 that October. The Century Association initially kept spirits high, with the same affairs and discussions at the club. On that New Year's Eve, a member donated suckling pigs for those present to enjoy with music and wine. Throughout the year, artists, sculptors, and authors began to be affected; however by 1931, the club's assets began growing again and funds began to multiply. In 1936, the Hamilton Club of Brooklyn merged with the Century Association.

=== 1940s to 1970s ===
In 1940, President Roosevelt made the Destroyers for Bases Agreement; this is attributed to his men, known as the Century Group, having held fortnightly dinners at the Century to discuss aiding the war effort. In 1941, as the U.S. entered World War II, club members began to enter the Army or Navy. The club put up a military map of Europe in its halls, which General Horace Sewell, part of New York's British Library of Information, maintained daily. In late 1945, members began returning from the armed forces; the club gave an official welcome back to the veterans in spring 1946. Twelve employees and 110 members of the club served in combat. They held ranks from private to major general or rear admiral in the war. Medals awarded included 4 Distinguished Service Medals and 16 Legion of Merit awards, among other US and international awards. On January 13, 1947, the club celebrated its 100th anniversary with events attended by 400 members.

=== 1980s to present ===
Around 1985, the issue of admitting women into the club arose. Judge Robert Bork resigned from the association that year, having also signed a petition in favor of the club's admittance of female club members. Beginning in 1986, the city government began to investigate the club, along with two others, for discrimination against women. Public Law 63, a New York City law enacted in October 1984, made it illegal for clubs to discriminate based on sex, race, origin, or other factors, unless the club was "distinctly private", defined as having fewer than 400 members and not providing regular meals or collecting regular dues or payment from nonmembers. In 1987, the law was brought before the New York Court of Appeals; the Century vowed to follow the law and admit women if the law was upheld, or to do nothing if the law was repealed. The 1987 vote passed with 71 percent in favor; the first poll, in 1982, passed by 80 percent and a 1985 poll was almost evenly split. Some members declared that they would resign if the club refused to admit women; some declared they would resign if it did begin admitting them. Some members stated they would rather withdraw amenities and become a distinctly private club. The University Club, in the same predicament at the time, voted to not comply with the law, leaving the city to enforce it.

Members were divided on the issue, as some found that the convening of "authors, artists and amateurs" would not change with the admittance of women; others determined "delightful difference of the sexes" was a benefit not to be eliminated by what was deemed a "fashionable whim". Women first were admitted as members to the club in 1988, after further contentious debates.

In late 2010, the members of the Century Association began to debate whether the club should end its reciprocity agreement with the Garrick Club in London, which allowed women to enter only in the company of men. After debating, the members voted to end the reciprocity agreement on March 1, 2011. One Garrick Club member told London's The Daily Telegraph that he "would not be mourning the loss of his colonial cousins – or access to their facilities." A male Century Association member told the New York Observer that giving up infrequent visits to the Garrick Club "versus condoning the discrimination of women" seemed like "a pretty easy trade-off".

== Buildings ==
=== Early homes ===
The club's fourth home, on 8th Street, was first occupied by the association in 1852. Henry L. Pierson supervised the move-in, and used his collection of copies of casts of the works of Bertel Thorvaldsen to adorn the rooms. Other members gave similar artworks to decorate. It was kept like a residential home on the first floor, and with the oil paintings and small tables.

=== 42 East 15th Street ===
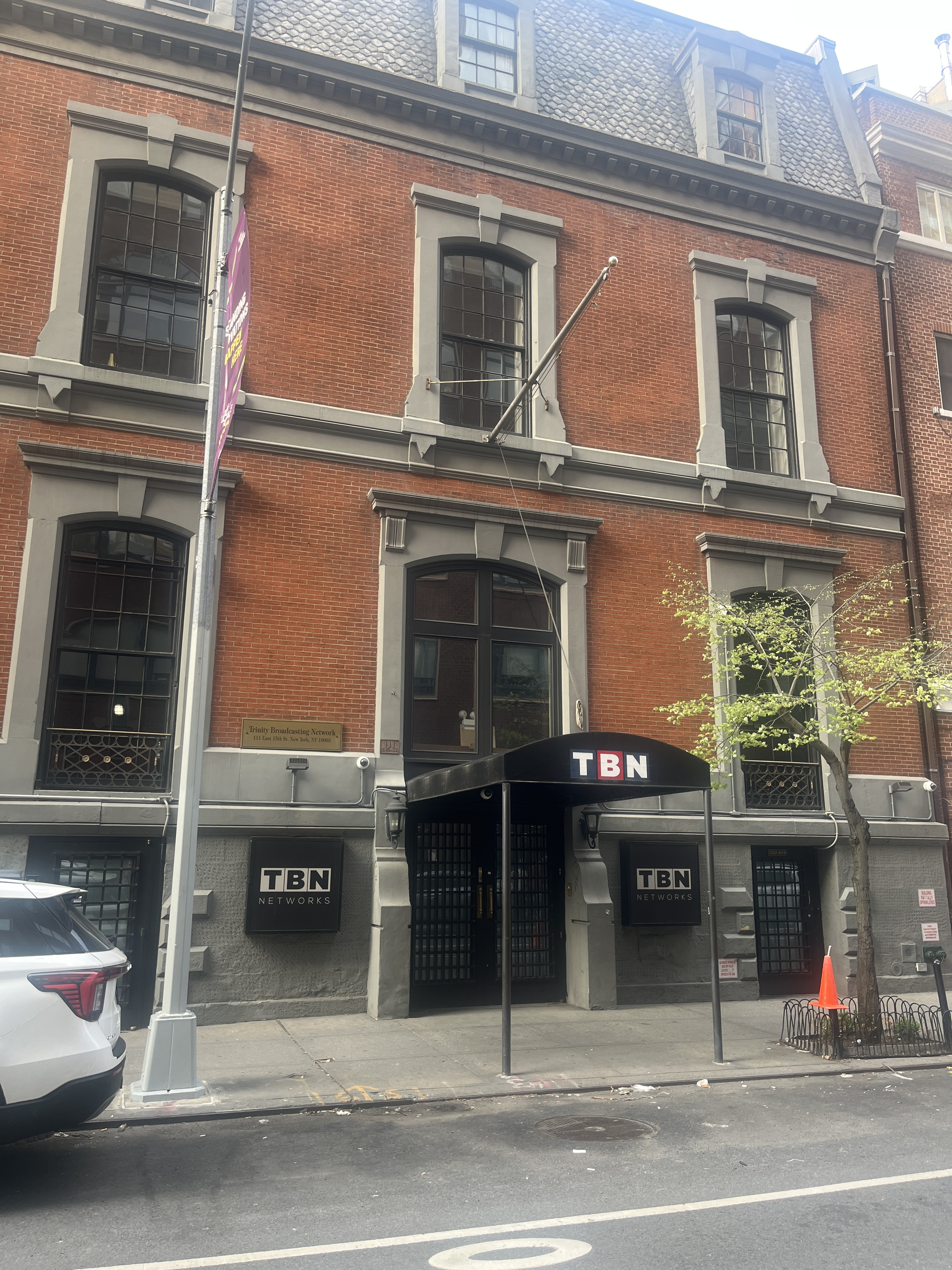
Former 15th Street location

The club's first permanent headquarters was an existing two-and-one-half-story residence at 42 East 15th Street, later redesignated 109–111, between Union Square East and Irving Place. Built in about 1847 and purchased by the Century Association in 1857 for $24,000, the dwelling was extensively remodeled four times during its 34 years as a clubhouse. The first time was immediately upon purchase under the direction of New York architect Joseph C. Wells, a Centurion. Expanded at a cost of $11,000, the renovated building was more than twice the size of the original house and styled like an Italian palazzo with facing of ashlar or possibly stucco treated to resemble ashlar masonry.

Continuing its growth in both membership and programs during and after the Civil War, the Century Association required larger facilities. Although the club's members considered moving, financial constraints led them in 1867 to ask member and architect Charles D. Gambrill (1834–1880) to enlarge their existing structure. Gambrill's plans called for internal alterations, an expansion to the rear to accommodate an art gallery on the second floor and a billiard room on the main floor, a mansard roof, and a new unified, brick exterior trimmed with Lockport limestone. The rear extension was promptly completed, but for reasons no longer understood the rest of work was delayed until 1869.

By the time construction began again, Gambrill had replaced his previous partner, George B. Post, with noted young architect Henry Hobson Richardson (1838–1886), who had recently returned from his architectural training in France and joined the Century Association. It appears that Richardson helped change Gambrill's initial plans, making this one of his early works, before he became one of the most influential architects in the United States (Jeffrey Karl Ochsner calls it Richardson's eighth commission). The 1869 remodeling cost $21,000, and included an upwards expansion into a mansard-covered third floor. Completely eliminating the prior palazzo feel, it featured a uniform Néo-Grec style. Although Richardson would later develop a highly personal Romanesque style, his training at the École nationale supérieure des Beaux-Arts in Paris equipped him to design in neo-Grec with its abstracted classical features that worked well in modern materials such as the brick employed here. In 1878, Gambrill and Richardson dissolved their partnership, and in the same year Richardson made yet further modifications to the clubhouse.

The building is the oldest surviving clubhouse in Manhattan, and has been a New York City landmark since 1993. The exterior was restored and the interior converted in 1996–97 by Beyer Blinder Belle, and in recent years it has been the Century Center for the Performing Arts, which had a 248-seat theatre, a ballroom and a studio. As of 2006 it is the New York production facility for Trinity Broadcasting Network, a religious television company.

=== Current location ===
In 1891, the Century Association left 15th Street for its current location, an Italian Renaissance-style palazzo at 7 West 43rd Street. At the time of the move the club had about 800 members. McKim, Mead & White was retained; their design established a preferred style for private clubhouse buildings all over the United States in the following decades. The structure was designated a New York City Landmark in 1967, and has been on the National Register of Historic Places since 1982. The clubhouse was restored by the architect Jan Hird Pokorny in 1992.

== Notable members ==
The Century Association counts about 2,000 current members and a historical total of about 11,000 members. A number of members have made significant contributions in the fields of government, law, science, academia, business, arts, journalism, and athletics, among others. Its members have included 29 Nobel Prize laureates, eight Presidents of the United States, ten US Supreme Court justices, 43 Members of the Cabinet, members of the Rockefeller, Vanderbilt, Roosevelt, Jay, Schieffelin and Astor families, and other noted individuals. Members are known as "Centurions." Centurions who have attained the presidency include Chester A. Arthur, Grover Cleveland, Theodore Roosevelt, William Howard Taft, Woodrow Wilson, Herbert C. Hoover, Franklin D. Roosevelt and Dwight D. Eisenhower.

Chief Justices have included Charles Evans Hughes, Harlan Fiske Stone, and William Howard Taft; associate justices included Samuel Blatchford, William J. Brennan Jr., Benjamin N. Cardozo, John Marshall Harlan, Lewis F. Powell Jr., Edward T. Sanford, and Potter Stewart.

=== Honorary members ===
The club has a tradition of selecting existing members as honorary members. These have included: George Bancroft, Augustus R. Macdonough, John H. Gourlie, William J. Hoppin, John Jay (grandson of Founding Father John Jay), Richard Henry Stoddard, Daniel Huntington, Worthington Whittredge, John La Farge, Henry Codman Potter, William Dean Howells, Charles Collins, Elihu Root, George Haven Putnam, Alexander Dana Noyes, Royal Cortissoz, and Henry Crampton.

== See also ==
- List of gentlemen's clubs in the United States
- List of New York City Designated Landmarks in Manhattan from 14th to 59th Streets
- National Register of Historic Places listings in Manhattan from 14th to 59th Streets
- The Century Company
- The Century Magazine
