= Jaye =

Jaye may refer to:

== First name ==
- Jaye Andrews (born 1960s), American professional basketball player
- Jaye Davidson (born 1968), American-born British model and actor
- Jaye Edwards (1918–2022), British aviator
- Jaye Griffiths (born 1963), British actress
- Jaye Jacobs (born 1982), English actress
- Jaye Luckett (currently known as Jammes Luckett; born 1974), American musician, writer, visual artist, and voice actor
- Jaye P. Morgan (born 1931), American singer, actress, and gameshow panelist
- Jaye Radisich (1976–2012), Australian politician
- Jaye Walton (1928–2017), Australian media personality

== Surname ==
- Cassie Jaye (born 1986), American actress and film director
- Chrystal Jaye, medical anthropologist
- Courtney Jaye (born 1978), American Indie music singer/songwriter
- David Jaye (born 1958), American politician
- Jerry Jaye (born 1937), American country/rockabilly singer
- Myles Jaye (born 1991), American baseball player
- Sally Jaye (born ?), American folk singer/songwriter

== See also ==
- Jay (given name)
- Jay (surname)
