= Jennifer Jay =

American environmental engineer

Jennifer Ayla Jay (born 1969) is a professor of civil and environmental engineering in the UCLA Henry Samueli School of Engineering and Applied Science, where she also serves as equity, diversity and inclusion officer, and as director of the Center for Community Engagement and Environmental Justice. Her research focuses on heavy metal and bacterial contamination of groundwater, in soil, and in littoral zones, and on the effects of food systems on the environment and on public health.

== Education and career ==
Jay is originally from New England. She was a student at the Massachusetts Institute of Technology, where she received a bachelor's degree in 1991, a master's degree in 1993, and a Ph.D. in 1999. Her doctoral dissertation, Effect of polysulfides on cinnabar solubility, partitioning, and methylation by Desulfovibrio desufuricans, was supervised by Harry Hemond.

She joined the UCLA faculty in 2002, and was a 2004 recipient of the Presidential Early Career Award for Scientists and Engineers, given "for collaborating with local non-profit groups involved in coastal water quality to study environmental factors that contribute to mercury contamination of food chains and developing models to analyze the fate of mercury in the environment".

== Personal life ==
After a previous divorce, in 2014 Jay married Joel Reynolds, western director and senior attorney for the Natural Resources Defense Council. They have a blended family of five children and live in Venice, Los Angeles.
