= Bread and Cheese Club (New York) =

The Bread and Cheese Club was a New York City-based intellectual group.

== History ==
The club was founded by author James Fenimore Cooper in 1824 and lasted at least until 1827. Also called "the Lunch" or "the Lunch Club", its membership of about 35 individuals consisted of American writers, editors, and artists, as well as scholars, educators, art patrons, merchants, lawyers, politicians, and other professionals who dabbled in the arts.

The literary part of the group derived from the Knickerbocker Group, named after Washington Irving's Knickerbocker’s A History of New York (1809).

The club did not survive Cooper's departure to Europe, but created enough solidarity among the members to go into conflict with John Trumbulls American Academy of the Fine Arts and found a rivalling Sketch Club that later turned into the National Academy of Design.

== See also ==
- James Fenimore Cooper
- Washington Irving
