= William Jay Schieffelin Jr. =

Businessman

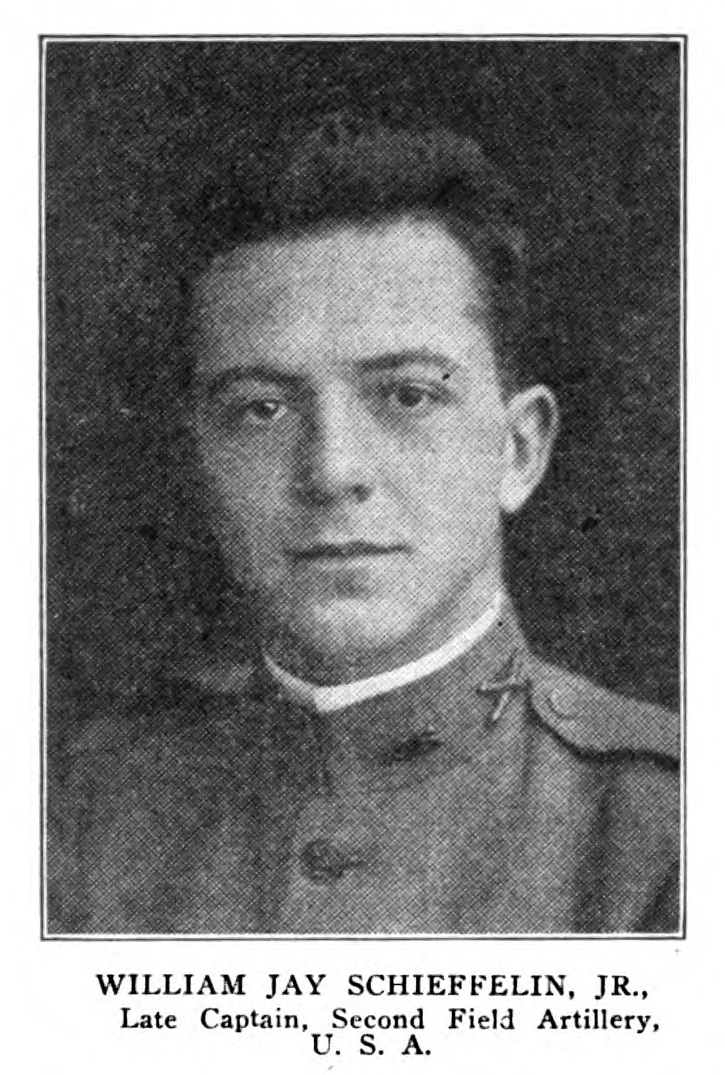
- Schieffelin c. 1919
- Born: November 30, 1891; New York City, U.S.
- Died: May 1, 1985 (aged 93)
- Occupations: Businessman, philanthropist
- Spouse: Annette Markoe (m. 1918)
- Children: 2
- Parent(s): William Jay Schieffelin and Maria Louise Shepard Schieffelin

William Jay Schieffelin Jr. (November 30, 1891 – May 1, 1985) was an American businessman and philanthropist.

== Early life and education ==
William Jay Schieffelin Jr. was the first son of William Jay Schieffelin and Maria Louise Shepard Schieffelin. He was born in Manhattan. Through his paternal ancestors, William was a descendant of John Jay, and through his maternal ancestors he was a member of the Vanderbilt family.

William Jay Schieffelin went to Miss Chapin’s Kindergarten and then to Bovee School and Groton School. After Groton School, William went to Yale University and graduated in 1914. At Yale, he was a member of Phi Beta Kappa and Sigma Xi.

== Military service ==
William Jay Schieffelin enlisted in the New York National Guard in October 1914 and served as a recruiter in the New York Cavalry. From 1916 to 1918, William Jay Schieffelin was Lieutenant at the 12th New York Infantry at the Mexican border in 1916 and served from June 1916 to March 10, 1917 at Camp McAllen, Texas.

In 1918, William Jay Schieffelin changed his branch from infantry to field artillery. He was assigned to 12th Field Artillery Regiment and departed for Europe, January 11, 1918, aboard the USS Olympic, and entered combat in March 1918. He also served in the American Expeditionary Forces in France. In April 1918, William Jay Schieffelin returned to New York, on board the USS Finland, to be an instructor of Field Artillery, at Camp Jackson, South Carolina. He was promoted Captain in September 1918 and ended his service in December 1918.

== Career ==
In 1914, William Jay Schieffelin Jr. started working for Schieffelin & Co, a pharmaceutical and liquor-importing house owned by his family. He was trained by Schieffelin in administration, laboratory, and sales, to become acquainted with all aspects of the company. From 1922 to 1952 he was CEO and from 1952 to 1962 he stayed on as a member of the board.

From 1962 to 1985, William was honorary director at Schieffelin. He managed Schieffelin & Co in the 6th generation after Jacob Schieffelin, who founded the company in 1794. Schieffelin became a subsidiary of Moët-Hennessy S. A. from France in 1980.

== Personal life ==
William Jay Schieffelin married Annette Markoe (1897–1997) of New York City in 1918. The wedding took place in the chapel of St. George’s Church at Stuyvesant Square in Manhattan. Annette Markoe was the daughter of Dr. James Wright Markoe, a doctor of J. P. Morgan. In 1920, Annette’s father was killed in St. George’s Church at Stuyvesant Square by an assassin who was hired to kill J.P. Morgan Jr.

The couple had two children, Ann Louise and William Jay.

William Jay Schieffelin Jr. had a strong interest in military history books, and his library was stocked with a collection inherited from his grandfather William Henry Schieffelin, who was a major in the American Civil War cavalry.

== Committee work and social commitment ==
Like his father, William Jay Schieffelin Jr. was involved in many institutions and associations:

- Member of the Board of Tuskegee University
- Member of the NAACP
- President of the National Wholesale Druggists’ Association
- Chairman of the Yale Alumni Fund
- Member of the Board of St. Luke’s Hospital in Manhattan
- Chairman of the Tax Commission of the New York Chamber of Commerce
- Director of the Y.M.C.A. in NYC
- Asset Manager of Carnegie Endowment for International Peace
- Founding member of the National Association of Beverage Importers
- Member of the Century Association (elected 1944)
