= Paul L. Jay =

Professor

Paul L. Jay (born 1946) is a professor at Loyola University Chicago where he teaches in the English Department. His research specialties include literary criticism, literary theory, modernism, modernity, American literature, comparative literature, border studies, and globalization.

Jay has written on these topics in recent articles, but has also published the following books: Contingency Blues: The Search for Foundations in American Criticism (1997); The Selected Correspondence of Kenneth Burke and Malcolm Cowley: 1915-1981 (1988); and Being In The Text: Self-Representation From Wordsworth to Roland Barthes (1984).

He was recently the keynote speaker at Redefining the New: Guiding The Direction of English Studies. He is also currently teaching a graduate seminar on Networked Public Culture, where he maintains a blog. The blog also showcases examples of Jay's photography. As an amateur photographer, Jay brings an interest in the reappropriation of images to his investigation of Networked Public Culture.
