= William Henry Schieffelin =

- Born: August 20, 1836; New York City
- Died: June 21, 1895 (aged 58)
- Spouse: Mary Jay (m. 1863)
- Children: 5

William Henry Schieffelin (August 20, 1836 – June 21, 1895), was an American businessman and Union Army cavalry officer in the American Civil War.

== Early life ==
William Henry Schieffelin was the first son of Samuel Bradhurst Schieffelin and Lucretia (nee Hazard) Schieffelin.

== Personal life ==
William Henry Schieffelin married Mary Jay (1845–1916) in 1863.

Mary Jay was the third generation of John Jay and Sarah Livingston Jay, the third daughter of John Jay and Eleanor Kingsland Field.

The couple had five children: Eleanor Jay, William Jay, Samuel Bradhurst, John Jay and Geoffrey.

The family lived at 242 East 15th Street on Stuyvesant Square in Gramercy Park, Manhattan and visited the Jays’ Estate in Bedford, NY (today’s John Jay Homestead), during the summer months.

== Military service ==
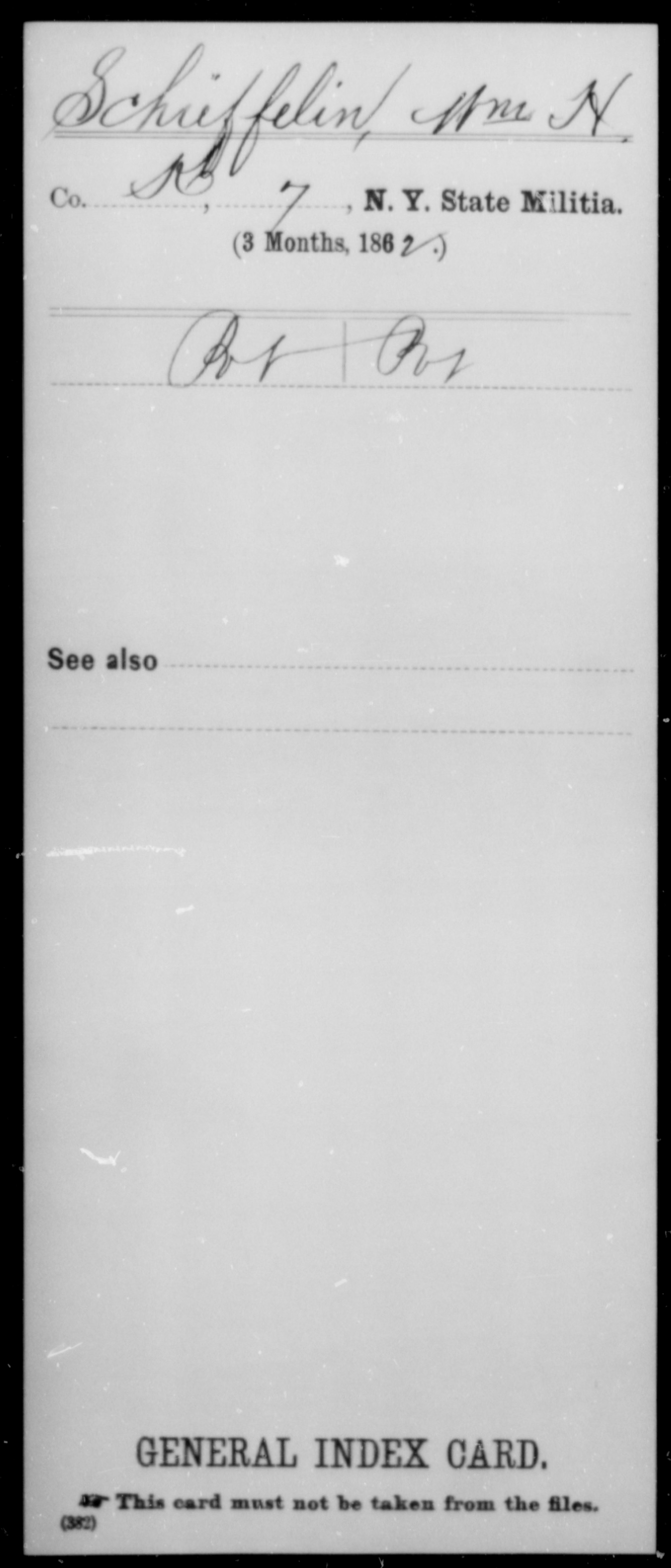
William Henry Schieffelin, New York State Militia enlistment in 1862. War Department. The Adjutant General's Office.

During the American Civil War in 1862, William Henry Schieffelin was drafted to the front with his 7th New York Infantry Regiment. In Baltimore he left his regiment, commissioned to recruit men for military service as Major of the 1st New York Mounted Rifles. With a troop under his command of more than 400 men, he served from 1863 to 1864 under General Wool during the siege of Suffolk, Virginia.

== Career ==
=== Schieffelin & Co ===
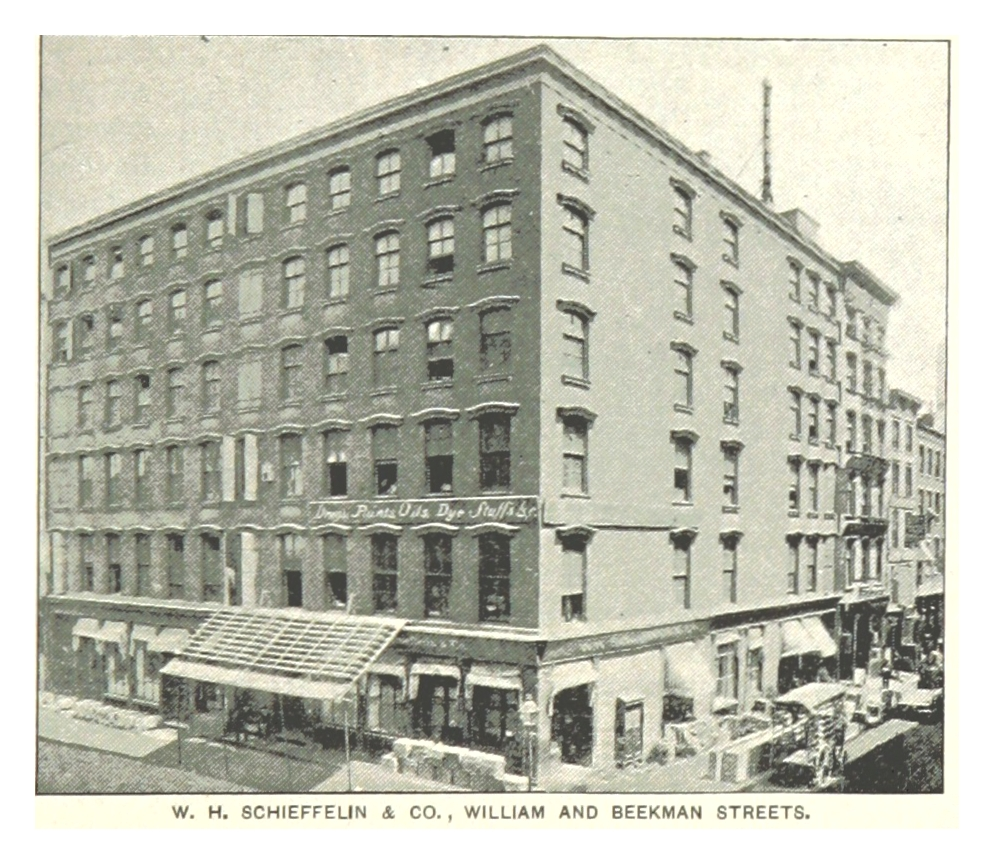
Office and Warehouse of W. H. Schieffelin & Co. 170 to 172 William Street, on the corner of Beekman Street in Manhattan.

William Henry Schieffelin joined the Schieffelin company in 1860 at the age of 24. He was the 4th generation in a direct line of succession to Jacob Schieffelin. The company address at that time was 170 to 172 William Street, on the corner of Beekman Street in Manhattan.

At the time of William Henry's military service during the period that the siege of Suffolk took place he participated in various engagements almost every day. Despite this, William Henry remained on the board of Schieffelin.

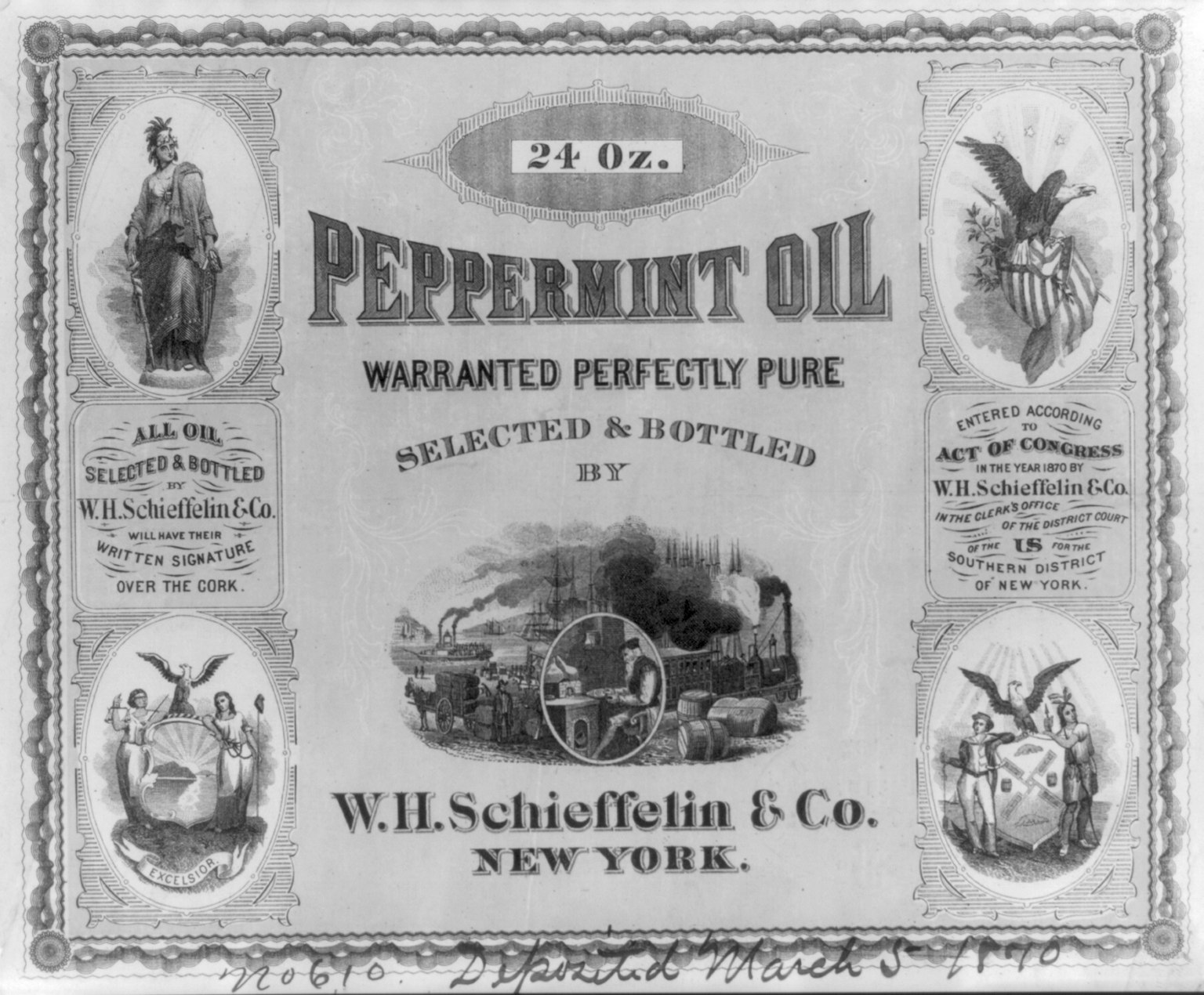
Peppermint oil by W. H. Schieffelin & Co. New York. 1870.

After the Civil War had ended, a long period of economic prosperity began. In 1865, William Henry’s father Samuel Bradhurst Schieffelin retired from the company. The company was renamed W. H. Schieffelin & Co, a name which existed from 1865 to 1894.

In the 1880s, Schieffelin was the first and exclusive distributor of the following pharmaceuticals in America: Phenacetin, Sulfonmethane and Aspirin.

Under the direction of William Henry, Schieffelin set up a laboratory for chemical and pharmaceutical substances in 1882. The lab was one of the most modern in the United States at that time.

In 1890, William Henry admitted his son William Jay Schieffelin to the company.

== Committee work and social commitment ==
- Vestryman in St. George's Church on Stuyvesant Square
- President of the Fisher Island Sportsman's Club
- Early Member of the Union League Club
- Charter Member of the City Club of New York
- Early Member of the Century Association (1887–1893)
- Member of the Veterans' Association of the 7th New York Infantry Regiment
- Member of the South Side Club of Oakdale, Long Island

== Character and hobbies ==
William Henry Schieffelin was fond of shooting and fishing, of driving fast horses and farming. He was good-looking and sang charmingly and presented a fine figure as a cavalry officer in the Civil War.
