= John Jay Schieffelin =

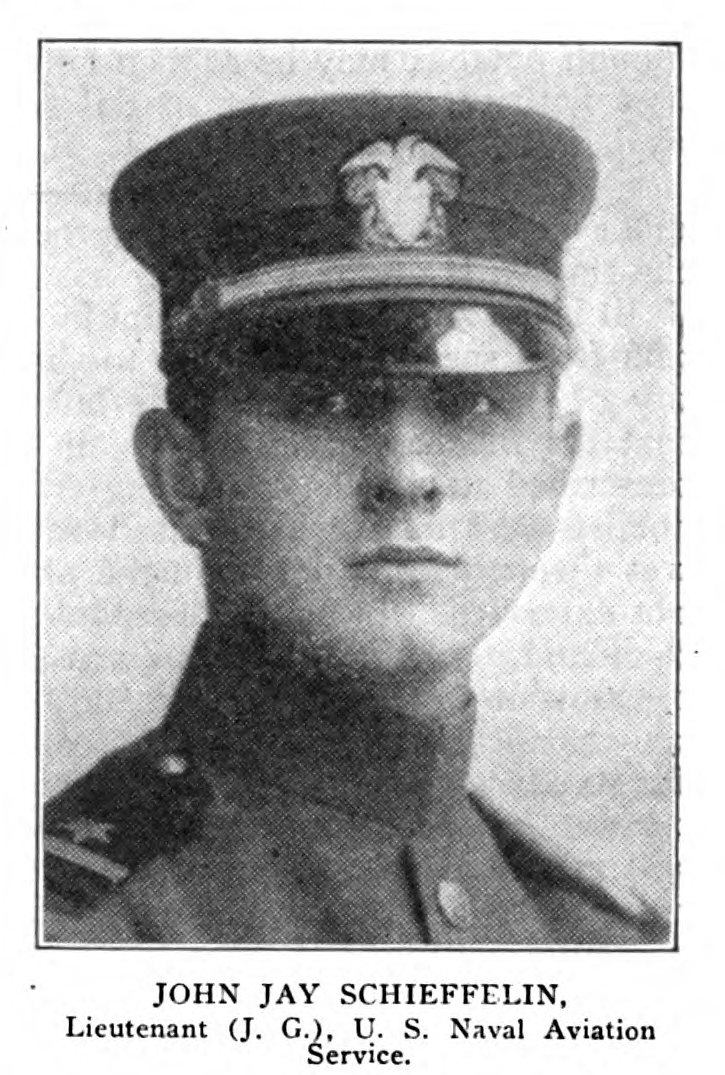
- Schieffelin c. 1919
- Born: October 31, 1897; Scarborough-on-Hudson, Westchester County, NY, U.S.
- Died: March 24, 1987 (aged 89); Manhattan, New York City
- Spouse(s): Eleanor Curtis Beggs; Lois Lindon Smith
- Parent(s): William Jay Schieffelin; Maria Louise Shepard Schieffelin

John Jay Schieffelin (October 31, 1897 – May 24, 1987), was an American rear admiral and executive director of the English-Speaking Union.

== Early life ==
John Jay Schieffelin was the second son of William Jay Schieffelin and Maria Louise Shepard Schieffelin. He was born in Scarborough-on-Hudson, NY.

Through his paternal ancestors John Jay Schieffelin was a descendant of John Jay, and through his maternal ancestors he was a member of the Vanderbilt family. His maternal grandma Margaret Louisa Vanderbilt Shepard built Woodlea mansion in Scarborough-on-Hudson, NY in 1895. (his birthplace)

== Personal life ==
John Jay Schieffelin married Eleanor Curtis Beggs from Pittsburgh, PA, in 1923. The couple had three children. They divorced in 1931.

John Jay Schieffelin remarried in 1932 with Lois Lindon Smith (1911–2007) from Boston, MA. The couple had one son.

== Military service ==
John Jay Schieffelin was awarded the Navy Cross as a lieutenant and pilot in World War I for successfully damaging German submarines in the North Sea. The U.S. Naval Air Force was stationed at Felixstowe and Killingholme, England. John was a member of the Yale Naval Aviation Group, a group of ambitious Yale University students who foresaw the need for air support for the U.S. Navy.

In December 1917, John Jay Schieffelin came to Liverpool in England and stayed in England until December 1918. John flew two successful attacks against German submarines in 1918. On July 9, 1918, he attacked and severely damaged a submarine, forcing it to surface where it was later sunk by a British destroyer. On July 19, 1918, he flew through stormy winds along the east coast of England, around Whitby. A gust hit his plane and bent the suspension of his bombs, forcing him to drop half of the load. When he saw a submarine appear, he immediately launched an attack.

During World War II, John rejoined the Navy as a coach for new recruits. As Rear Admiral, he received an award for his outstanding coaching, and he went on to found the John Jay Schieffelin Award for Excellence in Teaching.

== Career ==
After World War I, John graduated from Yale University. He joined the Yale rowers and emerged victorious against Princeton and Cornell in 1920.

Between World War I and World War II, John Jay Schieffelin worked as a manager for an insurance company.

== Committee work and social commitment ==
- Executive director of the English-Speaking Union (1963–1966)
- Sponsor of the John Jay Schieffelin Award for Excellence in Teaching
