= League to Enforce Peace =

American non-governmental organization

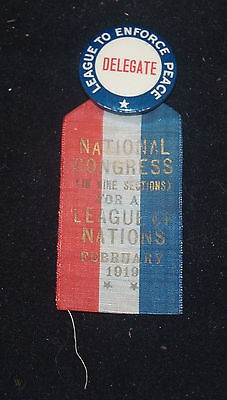
League to Enforce Peace delegate button

The League to Enforce Peace was a non-state American organization established in 1915 to promote the formation of an international body for world peace. It was formed at Independence Hall in Philadelphia by American citizens concerned by the outbreak of World War I in Europe. Support for the league dissolved and it ceased operations by 1923.

== History ==
=== Early 20th century ===
In 1905, Theodore Roosevelt, often in coordination with Republican leaders Henry Cabot Lodge and William Howard Taft, began offering proposals for the formation of a League of Nations to advance world peace. In his 1905 annual message to Congress, Roosevelt identified the need for some method of control of offending nations, which would ultimately become the responsibility of an international body.

In his Nobel Prize acceptance address, Roosevelt said: "it would be a master stroke if those great Powers honestly bent on peace would form a League of Peace, not only to keep the peace among themselves, but to prevent, by force if necessary, its being broken by others." The planned league would have executive power such as the Hague Conventions of 1899 and 1907 lacked. He called for American participation.

=== World War I ===
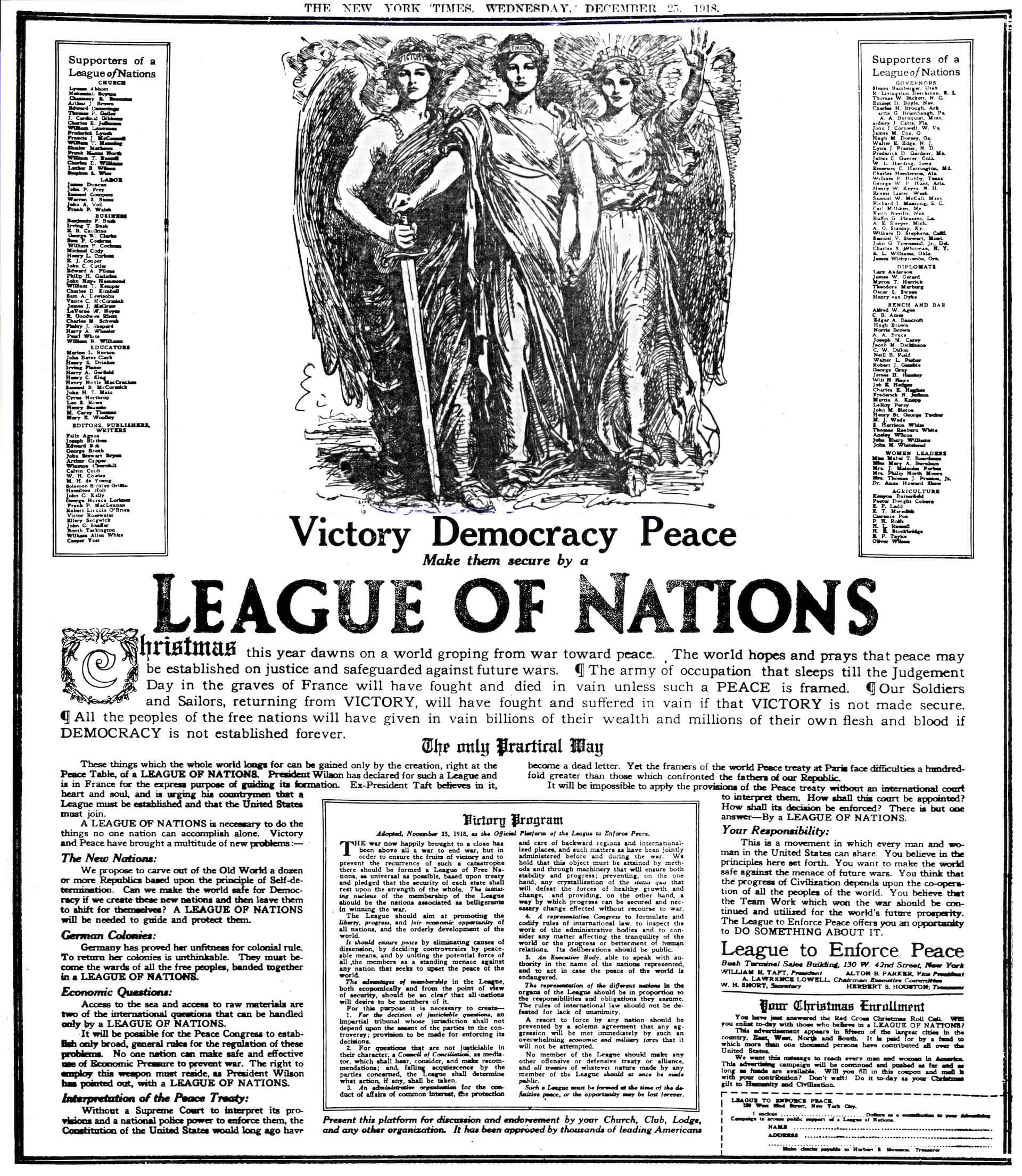
The League to Enforce Peace published this full-page promotion in The New York Times on Christmas Day 1918. It resolved that the League "should ensure peace by eliminating causes of dissension, by deciding controversies by peaceable means, and by uniting the potential force of all the members as a standing menace against any nation that seeks to upset the peace of the world".

Few expected a world war to start in 1914, but the July Crisis launched World War I and elevated the cause of peace to an immediate concern. Activism calling for the formation of an international organization to contain and respond to violence began in 1914 with speaking tours.

In September 1914, Roosevelt proposed "a World League for the Peace of Righteousness," which would preserve sovereignty but limit armaments and require arbitration and added that it should be "solemnly covenanted that if any nations refused to abide by the decisions of such a court, then others draw the sword in behalf of peace and justice." In 1915, he outlined this plan more specifically, urging that nations guarantee their entire military force, if necessary, against any nation that refused to carry out arbitration decrees or violated rights of other nations. He insisted upon the participation of the United States as one of the "joint guarantors." Roosevelt referred to this plan in a 1918 speech as "the most feasible for...a league of nations."

By this time, Wilson was strongly hostile to Roosevelt and Henry Cabot Lodge, and developed his own plans for a rather different League of Nations. It became reality along Wilson's lines at the Paris Peace Conference in 1919.

=== Formation ===
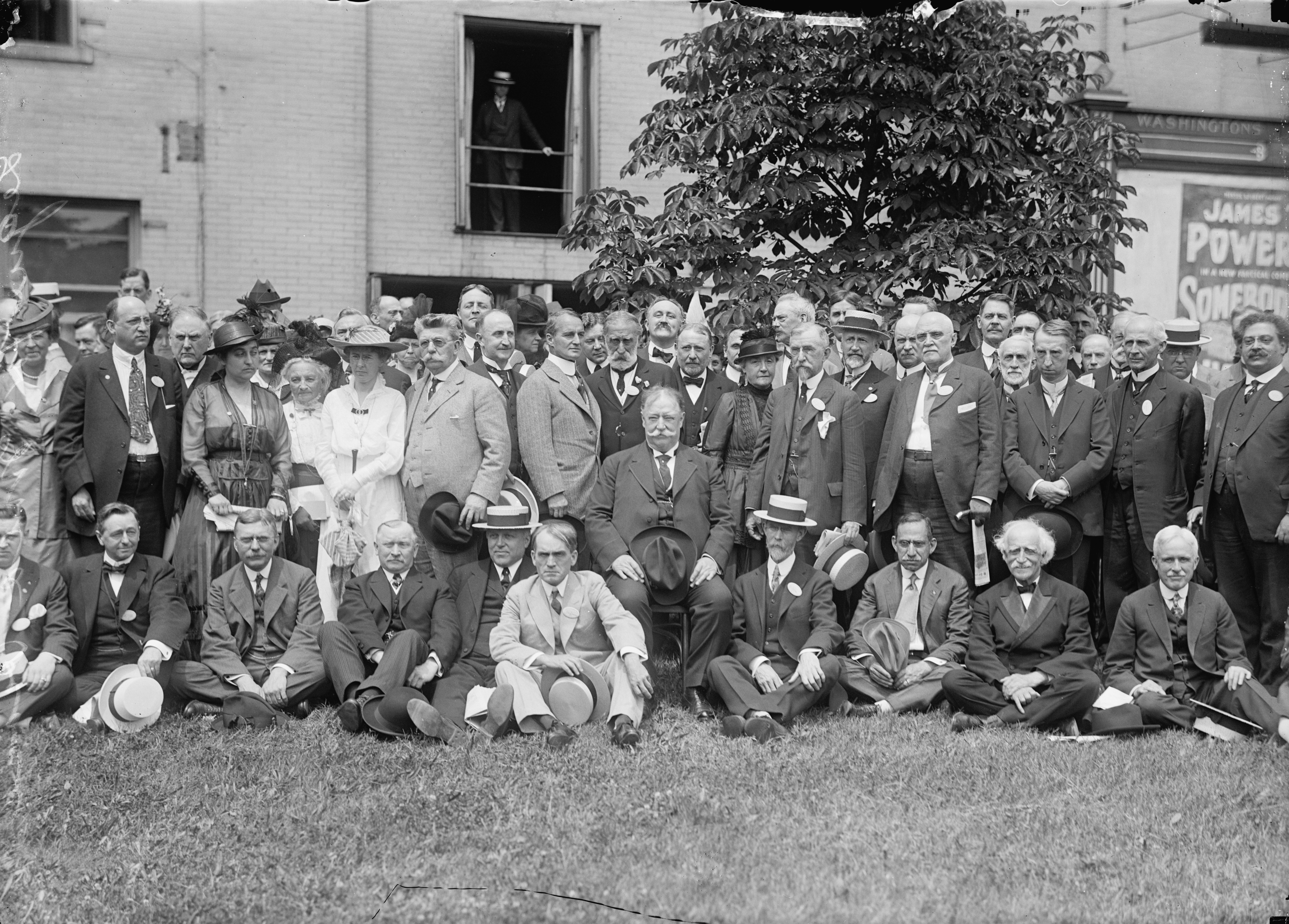
People in the League to Enforce Peace, including William H. Taft (center) in Philadelphia in 1916

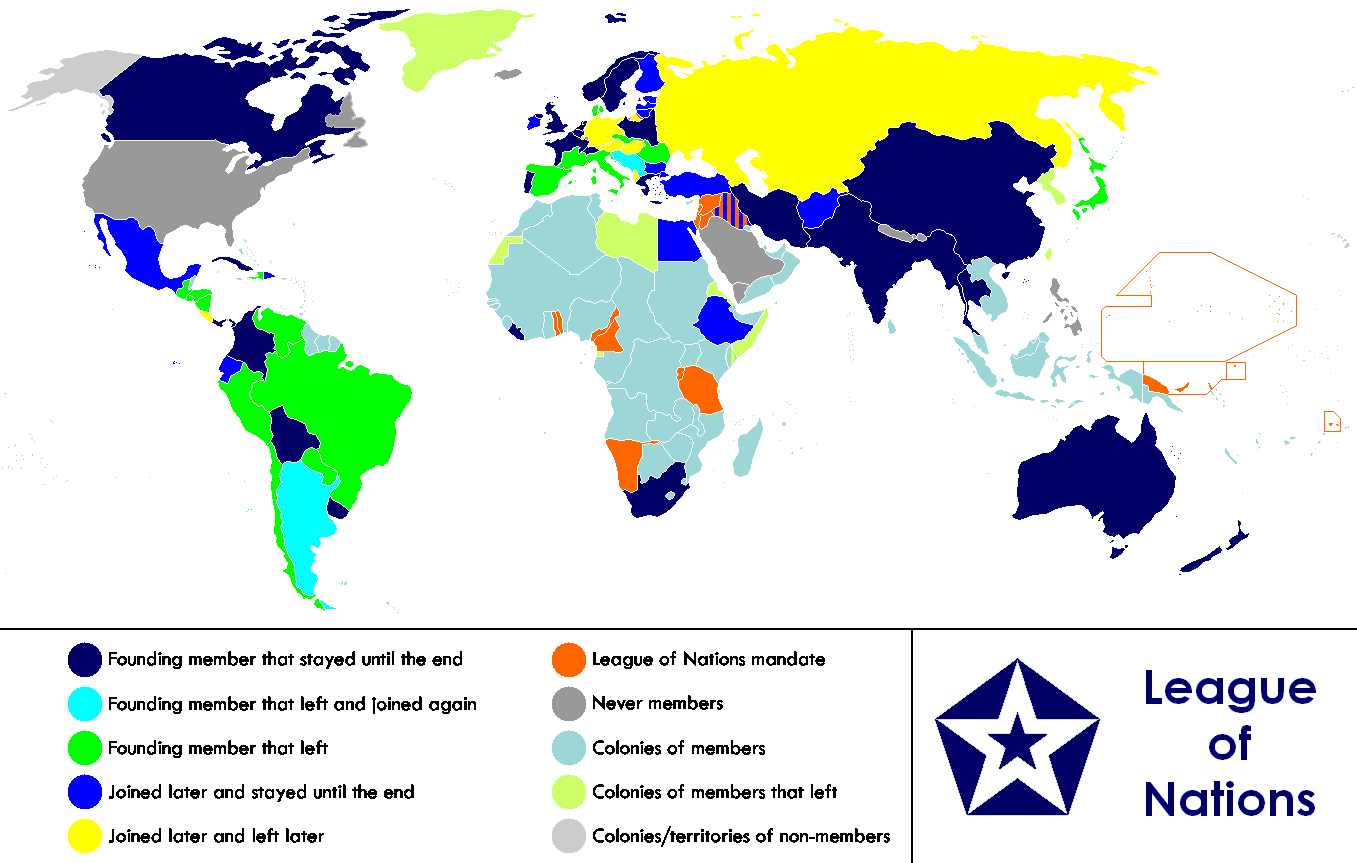
Anachronous world map (1920–1945) of the League of Nations

Advocates worked to distinguish their efforts from antiwar efforts aimed at preventing American participation in the war and to counter misimpression that they were trying to end the war in Europe. Hamilton Holt published an editorial in his New York City weekly magazine The Independent, "The Way to Disarm: A Practical Proposal", on September 28, 1914, which called for an international organization to agree upon the arbitration of disputes and to guarantee the territorial integrity of its members by maintaining military forces sufficient to defeat those of any non-member. The ensuing debate among prominent internationalists modified Holt's plan to align it more closely with proposals offered in Great Britain by Viscount James Bryce, a former British ambassador to the United States.

At a convention at Independence Hall in Philadelphia, on June 17, 1915, with former U.S. President William Howard Taft, serving as the league's first president, presiding, 100 notable Americans formally announced the League to Enforce Peace's formation. They proposed an international agreement in which participating nations would agree to "jointly use their economic and military force against any one of their number that goes to war or commits acts of hostility against another." The league's founders included Elihu Root, Alexander Graham Bell, Rabbi Stephen S. Wise, James Cardinal Gibbons of Baltimore, and Edward Filene on behalf of the recently founded U.S. Chamber of Commerce. Elected to the executive committee were Harvard University president Abbott Lawrence Lowell, former Cabinet member and diplomat Oscar S. Straus, magazine editor Hamilton Holt, Taft, and a dozen others

Pacifists rejected the league's notion of collective security, and nationalists rejected the idea of America submitting to arbitration. The founders, on the other hand, though varied in their outlooks, expressed a long-established ideal of the civilizing influence of the British Empire and American democracy. The initial efforts of the League to Enforce Peace aimed at creating public awareness through magazine articles and speeches. S. Harrison White, Justice and Chief justice of the Colorado Supreme Court, lectured across the United States on behalf of the League to Enforce Peace.

The League of Peace combined enthusiastic support for the American war effort with its proposals for a new international order to follow the defeat of Germany. It presented its plans for an international organization to respond to any nation that would follow a course like that of German militarism.

President Wilson's specific proposal for the League of Nations met resistance from the Republican-controlled Senate and the opposition led by Senator Henry Cabot Lodge of Massachusetts. The high-minded debate deteriorated until the ideal of international cooperation was, writes one historian, "sacrificed to party intrigue, personal antipathy, and pride of authorship." The League to Enforce Peace believed American participation was more important than the exact nature of the organization, but found itself defending Wilson's plan against attempts to restrict American participation in it. When the U.S. Senate debated the treaty with Germany, the League of Peace opposed attempts in the Senate to restrict American participation in international arbitration.

In February 1919, the League held a series of public meetings in more than half-a-dozen American cities in support of Wilson's League proposal. President Wilson thanked the League for its support.

In Summer 1919, the League of Peace published a book of essays The Covenanter: An American Exposition of the Covenant of the League of Nations, modeled on The Federalist Papers. It delivered a copy to every member of Congress. Lowell, Taft, and former Attorney-General George W. Wickersham were the authors. The New York Times called it a "masterly analysis" and thought it perfectly suited for a broad public: "This—thank Heaven—is a brochure for the lazy-minded!"

Lodge was willing to accept the League with serious reservations. In the end, on March 19, 1920, Wilson had Democratic Senators vote against the League with the Lodge Reservations while Republicans opposed Wilson's plan to join the League without reservations. The United States never joined the League of Nations.

=== League of Nations ===
With the formation of the League of Nations in 1920 the League of Peace changed focus slightly to raise grass roots American support for the League of Nations. For example, in November 1920, it analyzed the annual budgets of the League of Nations to demonstrate that participation in the League of Nations in the coming year would cost the United States "exactly one-tenth of one percent of what we spent on armaments during a single year before the war, while it would amount to something like two-thousandth of one percent of what the direct cost of our belligerency reached in 1918."

=== Dissolution ===
Support for the League of Peace dissolved and it ceased operations by 1923. Some of the League's records are held by the Harvard University Library.

== See also ==
- List of peace activists

== Sources and further reading ==
- Ashbee, Charles Robert. The American League to enforce peace; an English interpretation (1917) online
- Bartlett, Ruhl Jacob. The League to Enforce Peace (University of North Carolina Press, 1944)
- Cooper, John Milton, Jr, Breaking the Heart of the World: Woodrow Wilson and the Fight for the League of Nations (Cambridge UP, 2001P passim; p. 447. online
- Grubbs Jr, Frank L. "Organized labor and the league to enforce peace." Labor History 14.2 (1973): 247–258.
- Herman, Sondra R. Eleven Against War: Studies in American Internationalist Thought, 1898-1921 (Stanford, CA: Hoover Institution Press, 1969), ch. III: "The League to Enforce Peace: The Polity as Posse Comitatus" online
- Kuehl, Warren F. Seeking world order; the United States and international organization to 1920 (1969) online
- Mervin, David. "Henry Cabot Lodge and the League of Nations." Journal of American Studies 4#2 (1971): 201–214. online
- Olson, William Clinton. "Theodore Roosevelt's Conception of an International League" World Affairs Quarterly (1959) 29#3 pp 329–353.
- Pringle, Henry F. Life and times of William Howard Taft (vol 2, 1939) 2: 926–950. online
- Wertheim, Stephen. "The league that wasn't: American designs for a legalist-sanctionist league of nations and the intellectual origins of international organization, 1914–1920." Diplomatic History 35.5 (2011): 797–836. online
- Yeomans, Henry Aaron. Abbott Lawrence Lowell, 1856-1943 (Harvard UP, 1948) online

=== Primary sources ===
- Latané, John H. ed. Development of the League of Nations Idea: Documents and Correspondence of Theodore Marburg - Vol. 1 (1932)
- League to Enforce Peace. Win the War for Permanent Peace: Addresses Made at the National Convention of the League to Enforce Peace, in the City of Philadelphia, May 16th and 17th, 1918; Convention Platform and Governors' Declaration (1918)
- League to Enforce Peace: Enforced peace - Proceedings of the First National Assembly of the League to Enforce Peace, Washington, May 26–27, 1916
- Taft, William H., Theodore Marburg, Horace E. Flack. Taft Papers on League of Nations (1920) online
