= Harry Hemond =

American engineer

Harry F. Hemond is an American engineer, focusing on environmental chemistry and wetland chemistry. He is currently the William E. Leonhard Professor at the Massachusetts Institute of Technology.

== Education ==
Hemond received a Bachelor of Science from Worcester Polytechnic Institute and a Master of Arts from Connecticut College.
