= Henry M. Watts =

American politician

6th United States Minister to Austria-Hungary
- In office September 25, 1868 – June 1, 1869
- President: Andrew Johnson; Ulysses S. Grant
- Preceded by: John Lothrop Motley
- Succeeded by: John Jay II

Member of the Pennsylvania House of Representatives for Allegheny County
- In office 1835–1838

Personal details
- Born: Henry Miller Watts; October 10, 1805 Carlisle, Pennsylvania, US
- Died: November 30, 1890 (aged 85) Philadelphia, Pennsylvania, US
- Spouse: Anna Maria Shoenberger (m. 1838; died 1888)
- Relations: Frederick Watts (brother); William Carleton Watts (grandson)
- Children: 9, including Ethelbert
- Parent(s): David; Julia Anna (nee Miller)
- Education: Dickinson College

Henry Miller Watts (October 10, 1805 – November 30, 1890) was an American lawyer, politician, and diplomat.

== Early life ==
Watts was born in Carlisle, Pennsylvania, on October 10, 1805. He was the son of lawyer David Watts (1764–1819), who studied law under William Lewis, and Julia Anna (née Miller) Watts (d. 1869). His older brother, Frederick Watts, was President Ulysses S. Grant's U.S. Commissioner of Agriculture (and the first president of the board of trustees of what is now Penn State University).

He was the grandson of Revolutionary War officers Brigadier-general Frederick Watts (who immigrated to Pennsylvania around 1760 from Great Britain) and, his namesake, Lieutenant Colonel, later General, Henry Miller, who led Continental Army units in the siege of Boston and the engagements of Long Island, White Plains, Trenton, Princeton, Brandywine, Germantown and Monmouth. General Miller was "on intimate and confidential relations with General Washington and Colonel Hamilton; belonged to the Cincinnati Society, and during the course of his life held several civil offices under the Federal party."

He graduated from Dickinson College in 1824 and then studied law in Carlisle under Andrew Carothers, a pupil of his later father.

== Career ==
Upon admission to the bar in 1827, he began practicing law in Pittsburgh. In 1828, he was commissioned Deputy Attorney General of Pennsylvania, serving until 1829. In 1835, he was elected to the Pennsylvania legislature from Allegheny County and served three terms until 1838. In 1841, President William Henry Harrison appointed him District Attorney for the Eastern District of Pennsylvania. After travelling to Europe in 1857 where he educated his children in the elementary schools of Paris, he moved to Philadelphia where he was a co-founder of the Union League of Philadelphia.

After the Austro-Hungarian Compromise of 1867, Watts was appointed by President Andrew Johnson as the American Envoy Extraordinary and Minister Plenipotentiary to the Austro-Hungarian Empire on July 25, 1868. President Johnson had previously nominated the eight men (successively, Edgar Cowan, Frank P. Blair Jr., James W. Nesmith, John P. Stockton, Henry J. Raymond, Horace Greeley, Samuel S. Cox, and Henry A. Smythe) to be Minister, but the Senate rejected or declined to consider them, most likely because of the President's disputes with the Congress over other issues. Watts presented credentials to Emperor Franz Joseph I on September 25, 1868, serving until his mission was terminated and he presented recall on June 1, 1869. After leaving his post, he visited Russia, Poland, Sweden, Norway, Denmark and other European countries.

After returning to the United States, he was engaged in the development of the iron and coal interests in Pennsylvania.

== Personal life ==
In 1838, Watts was married to Anna Maria Shoenberger (1818–1888), a daughter of Sarah (née Krug) Shoenberger and Dr. Peter Shoenberger of Pittsburgh, who built the Juniata Iron Mill and what became the Shoenberger Steel Company. Together, they were the parents of nine children, including:

- Henry Shoenberger Watts (1844–1876)
- Ethelbert Watts (1846–1919), a diplomat who married Emily Pepper, sister of Dr. William Pepper Jr. (provost of the University of Pennsylvania), in 1871
- William Meredith Watts (1847–1899)
- John Shoenberger Watts (1850–1933), who married Mary Peace (1858–1880) in 1877. After her death, he married Mary Rhodes Mauran (1859–1942) in 1884.
- Charles Alfred Watts (1859–1934), who married Caroline Helmuth (1865–1907).

His wife died February 1, 1888, in Germantown, Pennsylvania. Watts died at his residence in Philadelphia on November 30, 1890. He was buried at Laurel Hill Cemetery in Philadelphia.

=== Descendants ===
Through his son Ethelbert, he was a grandfather, among others, of Rear Admiral William Carleton Watts (1880–1956) and Henry Miller Watts (1875–1959), who married Laura Barney, a daughter of Charles D. Barney (founder of present-day Smith Barney) and granddaughter of financier Jay Cooke.

Diplomatic posts
Preceded by John Lothrop Motley	U.S. Minister to the Austrian Empire; 1868–1869	Succeeded by John Jay II
