= Erastus D. Culver =

American politician

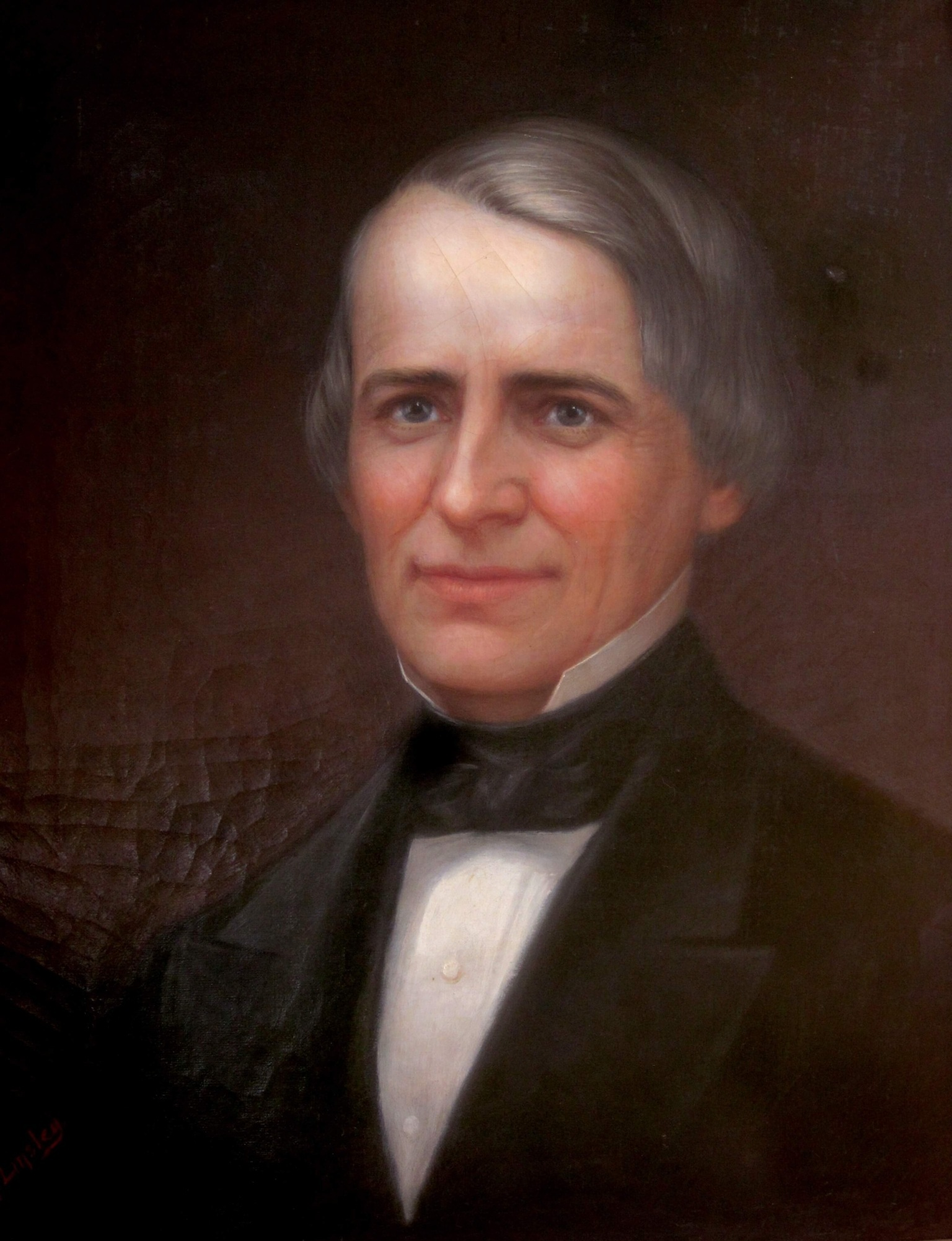

U.S. Minister to Venezuela
- In office July 12, 1862 – May 17, 1866
- President: Abraham Lincoln; Andrew Johnson
- Preceded by: Henry Taylor Blow
- Succeeded by: James Wilson

Judge of Brooklyn City Court
- In office 1854–1861
- Preceded by: John Greenwood
- Succeeded by: George G. Reynolds

Member of the U.S. House of Representatives from New York's 14th district
- In office March 4, 1845 – March 3, 1847
- Preceded by: Charles Rogers
- Succeeded by: Orlando Kellogg

Member of the New York State Assembly from Washington County
- In office January 1, 1841 – December 31, 1841 Serving with Reuben Skinner
- Preceded by: John H. Boyd, Anderson Simpson
- Succeeded by: James McKie Jr., Dan S. Wright
- In office January 1, 1838 – December 31, 1838 Serving with Leonard Gibbs
- Preceded by: Joseph W. Richards, Charles Rogers
- Succeeded by: Salmon Axtell, Jesse S. Leigh

Personal details
- Born: March 15, 1803 Champlain, New York
- Died: October 13, 1889 (aged 86) Greenwich, New York
- Party: Whig; Republican
- Education: University of Vermont

Erastus Dean Culver (March 15, 1803 – October 13, 1889) was an attorney, politician, judge, and diplomat from New York City.

Culver was active in the anti-slavery movement and, while in Congress in the 1840s, opposed the extension of slavery to Texas and the Oregon Territory. As an attorney, Culver was part of a team that defended eight Virginia slaves in a freedom suit, Lemmon v. New York (1852), successfully gaining their freedom in New York City's Superior Court. Culver was later elected judge of Brooklyn's City Court, serving from 1854 to 1861. In 1857 Culver decided the well-known freedom suit of a fugitive slave named "Jeems" and set him free by ruling against the people who had detained him, including police officers who hoped to collect a bounty under the Fugitive Slave Act of 1850.

From 1862 to 1866 Culver served as Minister to Venezuela. He later returned to his former hometown of Greenwich, New York, where he was active in several business ventures until his death in 1889.

== Early life and start of career ==
Culver was born in Champlain, New York on March 15, 1803. He graduated from the University of Vermont in 1826, taught school for a period, and read the law with an established firm. He was admitted to the bar in 1831 and commenced practice in Fort Ann, New York.

He joined the Whig Party and became active in government and politics, including winning election as Fort Ann's Town Clerk and serving from 1833 to 1835.

In 1836 Culver moved to Greenwich, New York. He was elected the New York State Assembly in 1838 and 1841.

== Congressional career ==
In 1844 Culver was elected to Congress, and he served one term, March 4, 1845, to March 3, 1847. He was an anti-slavery advocate in the House, and his first act as a Congressman was to present a petition from residents of New York, which asked for slavery to be abolished in the District of Columbia. He also drew attention for his speech opposing the extension of slavery to Oregon Territory and the Republic of Texas when they joined the United States.

== Judicial career ==
Culver moved to Brooklyn, New York in 1850, where he established a law practice and became prominent as an advocate for New York City and Brooklyn abolitionists. Chester Alan Arthur studied law with Culver, and later became a partner in Culver's firm.

Together Culver, Arthur and John Jay (grandson of the chief justice of the same name) successfully argued Lemmon v. New York (1852), a freedom suit. Virginia slave owners had brought slaves with them and stopped temporarily in New York, from where they intended to travel to Texas. The slaves were discovered to be in New York by an African-American activist, who petitioned the court by a writ of Habeas corpus. They were temporarily freed and Culver, Arthur and Jay successfully argued that the slaves could not be considered property in New York, which had abolished slavery, and should remain free.

Culver became a Republican when the party was founded in the 1850s. In 1854 he was elected judge of Brooklyn's city court, and he served until 1861.

One of Culver's prominent cases took place in 1857, soon after the decision in the Dred Scott case, and as tensions over slavery were rising before the American Civil War. He ruled in a freedom suit in favor of a fugitive slave owned by James Stead of Georgia. The slave Jeems, described as "nearly white," had escaped and traveled by steamship from Florida to New York City. Upon arrival, Jeems was detained by police officers (alerted by the ship's captain), who put him in irons and detained him at a house in Brooklyn, intending to return him under the Fugitive Slave Act of 1850 and claim the bounty.

Upon being detected and cited into court, the police officers and Stead's attorney argued that New York's laws against slavery did not apply because Stead and Jeems were residents of another state. Culver disagreed and issued a writ of habeas corpus. Jeems was freed, and activists aided him in reaching the Underground Railroad and relocating to Canada. The steamship captain, the owner of the house were Jeems was held, and the two police officers were charged with conspiracy and kidnapping.

== Diplomatic career ==
Culver was a popular orator. He was seated on the dais when Abraham Lincoln gave his 1860 Cooper Union speech and, by popular demand, he gave a speech after Lincoln's.

In 1862 Culver was appointed by President Lincoln as Minister to Venezuela, and he served until 1866. Upon arriving to begin his duties, Culver unwittingly caused a diplomatic faux pas by presenting his credentials to José Antonio Páez, whose government was not recognized by the United States. Culver's instructions had not been clear, and after he provided de facto recognition of the Páez government by this action, Secretary of State Seward wrote to him with instructions to formally withdraw it. Official diplomatic relations were broken off, but Culver had become friendly with Páez, who allowed him to remain.

== Later life ==
Upon returning to the United States, Culver again took up residence in Greenwich, where he continued to practice law. He also became involved in several business ventures, including serving as president of the First National Bank of Greenwich and member of the board of directors of the Greenwich and Johnsonville Railway.

== Death and burial ==
Culver lived in Greenwich during his retirement. He died there on October 13, 1889, and was interred in the Culver vault at Greenwich Cemetery.

U.S. House of Representatives
Preceded by Charles Rogers	Member of the U.S. House of Representatives from New York's 14th congressional district March 4, 1845 – March 3, 1847	Succeeded by Orlando Kellogg
Diplomatic posts
Preceded by Henry T. Blow	United States Minister to Venezuela; 7 October 1862 – 17 May 1866	Succeeded by James Wilson
