= Orlando Kellogg =

American politician

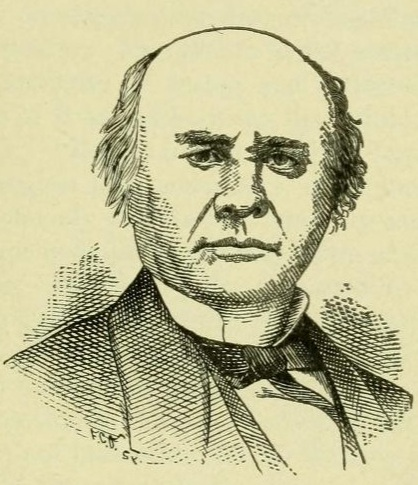

Member of the U.S. House of Representatives from New York
- In office March 4, 1847 – March 3, 1849
- Preceded by: Erastus D. Culver
- Succeeded by: George R. Andrews
- Constituency: 14th district
- In office March 4, 1863 – August 24, 1865
- Preceded by: William A. Wheeler
- Succeeded by: Robert S. Hale
- Constituency: 16th district

Personal details
- Born: June 18, 1809 Elizabethtown, New York
- Died: August 24, 1865 (aged 56) Elizabethtown, New York
- Party: Whig (before 1860); Republican
- Relatives: La Fayette Kellogg (brother)
- Occupation: Lawyer

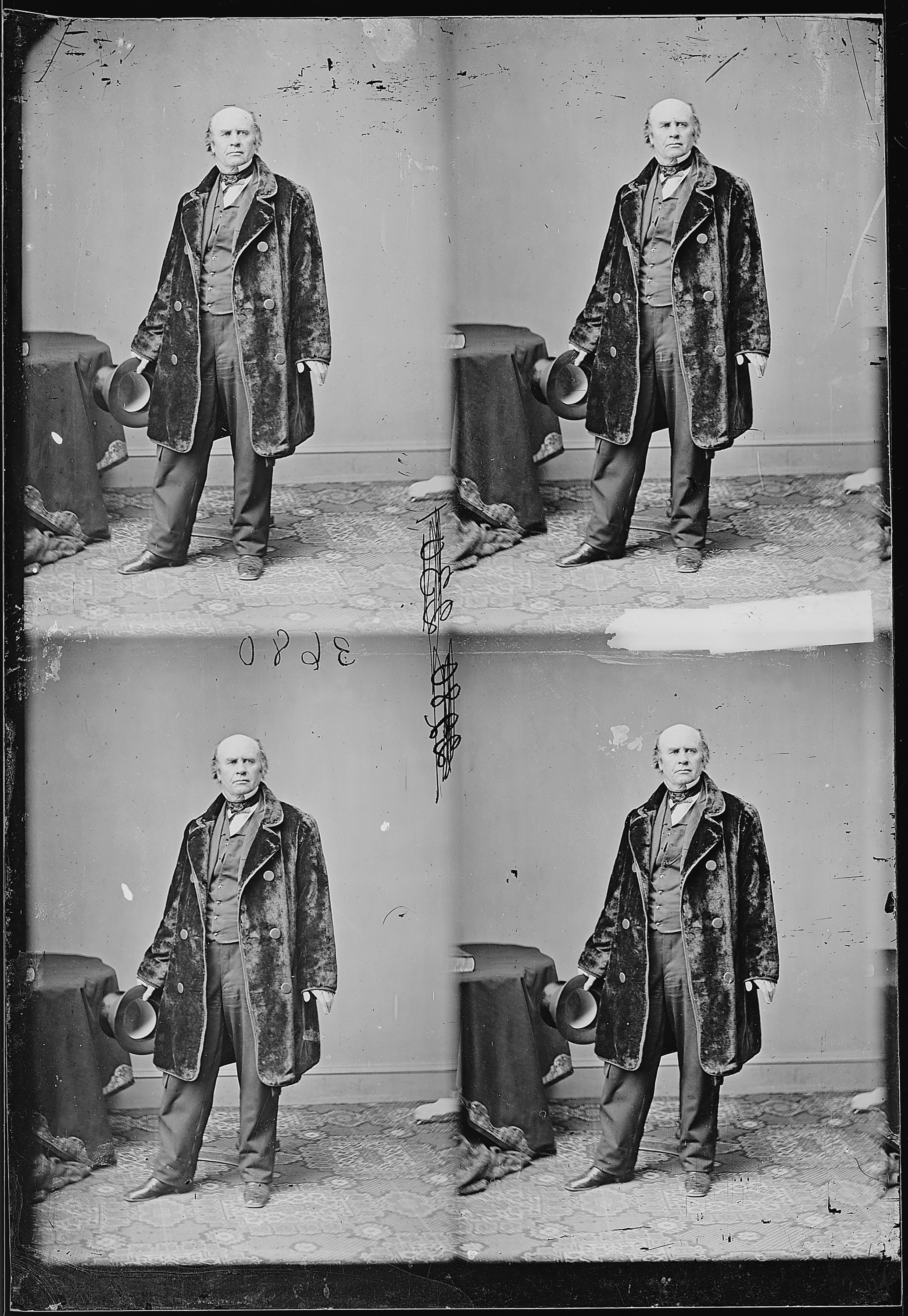
Orlando Kellogg

Orlando Kellogg (June 18, 1809 – August 24, 1865) was a U.S. representative from New York during the latter half of the American Civil War and the early days of Reconstruction.

== Biography ==
Kellogg was born in Elizabethtown, New York and Kellogg pursued an academic course. He engaged in the carpentry trade in his early youth. He went on to study law, was admitted to the bar in 1838, and commenced practice in Elizabethtown. He served as surrogate of Essex County 1840–1844.

Kellogg was elected as a Whig to the Thirtieth Congress (March 4, 1847 – March 3, 1849). He was not a candidate for renomination in 1848. He resumed the practice of his profession in Elizabethtown, New York. He served as a delegate to the 1860 Republican National Convention.

Kellogg was elected as a Republican to the Thirty-eighth and Thirty-ninth Congresses and served from March 4, 1863, until his death in Elizabethtown, New York, August 24, 1865. He was interred in Riverside Cemetery.

State Senator Rowland C. Kellogg (1843–1911) was his son.

== See also ==
- List of members of the United States Congress who died in office (1790–1899)

U.S. House of Representatives
Preceded by Erastus D. Culver	Member of the U.S. House of Representatives from New York's 14th congressional district 1847–1849	Succeeded by George R. Andrews
Preceded by William A. Wheeler	Member of the U.S. House of Representatives from New York's 16th congressional district 1863–1865	Succeeded by Robert S. Hale
