= Charles Rogers (New York politician) =

U.S. Representative from New York (1800–1874)

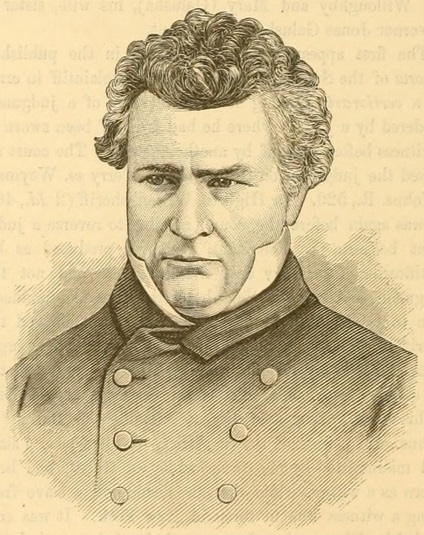
- Charles Rogers, Congressman from New York

Member of the U.S. House of Representatives from New York's 14th district
- In office March 4, 1843 – March 3, 1845
- Preceded by: Henry Bell Van Rensselaer
- Succeeded by: Erastus D. Culver

Personal details
- Born: April 30, 1800 Northumberland, New York, U.S.
- Died: January 13, 1874 (aged 73) Sandy Hill, New York, U.S.
- Resting place: Union Cemetery, Sandy Hill, New York, U.S.
- Party: Whig
- Education: Union College

Charles Rogers (April 30, 1800 – January 13, 1874) was a U.S. representative from New York.

== Biography ==
Rogers was born in Northumberland, New York, on April 30, 1800. His father died when Rogers was 10 years old, and after his mother's remarriage he was raised primarily by an uncle in Lake George.

He attended Granville Academy, and graduated from Union College in 1818, where his classmates included William Henry Seward, Sidney Breese, Alonzo Potter and Augustus Porter.

Rogers then studied law with his stepfather, Judge Esek Cowen, and was admitted to the bar. His father had been a successful lumberman and merchant, and Rogers was financially secure enough to pursue life as a gentleman farmer in Sandy Hill, along with research in botany and other scientific fields and writing on politics and other topics.

Rogers became active in politics in the 1820s as a supporter of DeWitt Clinton. He became a Whig in the 1830s, and served in the New York State Assembly in 1833 and 1837. In the late 1830s he was an unsuccessful Temperance candidate for New York State Senate.

In 1842 Rogers was elected to the United States House as a Whig. He served in the 28th Congress, March 4, 1843 to March 3, 1845. During his term, Rogers was chairman of the Committee on Expenditures in the Department of State, and advocated the abolition of slavery in the District of Columbia. He did not run for reelection in 1844.

Rogers became a Republican when the party was founded. He was a popular orator, and campaigned frequently for Republican candidates. During the American Civil War he supported the Union and worked to recruit soldiers for New York's volunteer regiments.

After the war Rogers supported a policy of moderation towards the former Confederacy, and took part in the 1866 National Union Convention.

In 1872 Rogers supported Horace Greeley for president, but did not actively campaign.

== Death and burial ==
Rogers died in Sandy Hill (now Hudson Falls) on January 13, 1874, and was buried at Union Cemetery near Sandy Hill.

== Family ==
In 1827 Rogers married Susan A. Clark. They were the parents of six children, three sons and three daughters, all of whom lived to adulthood.

Two of Rogers' sons served in the Union Army, including James Clarence Rogers (1838–1907), who commanded the 123rd New York Volunteer Infantry and received brevet promotion to brigadier general at the end of the war.

U.S. House of Representatives
Preceded by Henry Bell Van Rensselaer	Member of the U.S. House of Representatives from New York's 14th congressional district March 4, 1843 – March 3, 1845	Succeeded by Erastus D. Culver
