= La Fayette Kellogg =

Wisconsin pioneer

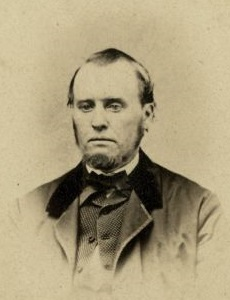
- Born: February 1, 1819; Elizabethtown, New York, U.S.
- Died: June 4, 1878 (aged 59); Madison, Wisconsin, U.S.
- Resting place: Forest Hill Cemetery, Madison, Wisconsin
- Known for: Clerk of the Wisconsin Supreme Court (1853–1878); Secretary of the Wisconsin Territory House of Representatives (1845–1848); Secretary of the first Wisconsin Constitutional Convention (1846)
- Spouses: Rosa Ormsby Catlin (m. 1843; died 1863); Helen Rosamond Adams (m. 1865–1878)
- Children: with Rosa Catlin; Clarence Kellogg^{(b. 1844; died 1915)}; Edward C. Kellogg^{(b. 1848; died 1902)}; Carrie (Bliss)^{(b. 1858; died 1951)}; with Helen Adams; Helen Julia Kellogg^{(b. 1872; died 1957)}
- Relatives: Orlando Kellogg (brother)

La Fayette Kellogg (February 1, 1819 – June 4, 1878) was an American merchant, court clerk, and Wisconsin pioneer. He served as clerk of the Wisconsin Supreme Court from 1853 to 1878, and previously served as clerk of the Wisconsin Territory's Supreme Court from 1840 until Wisconsin achieved statehood in 1848. Additionally, he was chief clerk of the Wisconsin Territory's House of Representatives from 1845 through 1848, and was secretary of the first Wisconsin Constitutional Convention.

== Biography ==
La Fayette Kellogg was born in Elizabethtown, New York, and received his education in that state. He came west to Mineral Point, Wisconsin Territory, in 1838, and moved to the new territorial capital, Madison, the following year. He was originally interested in mercantile pursuits, but, in August 1840, he was appointed clerk of the Wisconsin Territory's Supreme Court. He served capably in that role for the next 8 years.

In January 1845, the Wisconsin Territory's House of Representatives elected Kellogg as their chief clerk for the 3rd session of the 4th Wisconsin Territorial Assembly. He was subsequently re-elected for the 4th session, and all sessions of the 5th Wisconsin Territorial Assembly, and thus served as the clerk to both the territory's Supreme Court and House of Representatives from 1845 through the end of the territorial period in 1848.

In 1846, he was also elected secretary of the first Wisconsin Constitutional Convention, which produced a constitution that was ultimately rejected by voters in 1847.

In 1851, Kellogg returned to service with the Supreme Court as deputy clerk, and just two years later became clerk of the court again. He continued as clerk of the court until his death in 1878. After which, he was succeeded by his son, Clarence, who was clerk of the Supreme Court until his own death in 1915.

== Personal life and family ==
Kellogg was one of at least seven children born to Rowland Kellogg and his wife Sarah (née Titus). His older brother Orlando Kellogg was a member of the United States House of Representatives from New York.

La Fayette Kellogg married twice. His first wife was Rosa Ormsby Catlin, a niece of John Catlin, who had been the 6th and final secretary of the Wisconsin Territory. After her death in 1863, he went on to marry Helen Rosamond Adams, a sister of another prominent Madisonian. Kellogg was survived by five children—at least three of those were from his first wife, and at least one was from his second wife.
