= Rufus Wheeler Peckham (1809–1873) =

American jurist and politician

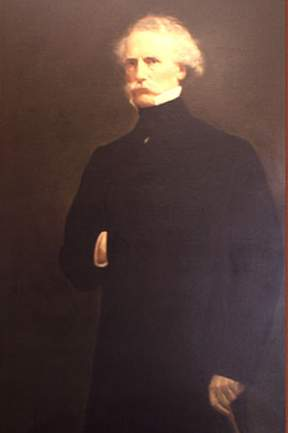

Member of the U.S. House of Representatives from New York's 14th district
- In office March 4, 1853 – March 3, 1855
- Preceded by: John H. Boyd
- Succeeded by: Samuel Dickson

Personal details
- Born: December 20, 1809
- Died: November 22, 1873 (aged 63)
- Party: Democratic
- Children: Wheeler; Rufus; Joseph

Rufus Wheeler Peckham (December 20, 1809 – November 22, 1873) was an American jurist and politician who served in the United States House of Representatives for New York's 14th congressional district from 1853 to 1855.

Aside from his time in Congress, Peckham served on the New York Supreme Court and New York Court of Appeals. Two of his sons were nominated to the Supreme Court of the United States, the younger of whom, Rufus W. Peckham, was successfully confirmed by the Senate.

Peckham ultimately died in the November 1873 sinking of the SS Ville du Havre.

== Early life ==
Peckham was born in Rensselaerville, New York, in Albany County on December 20, 1809, to Peleg Benjamin (1762–1828) and Desire (Watson) Peckham (1767–1852). Raised in Cooperstown, New York, he attended Hartwick Seminary.

Peckham graduated from Union College at Schenectady in 1827, where he was an early member of the Kappa Alpha Society. After reading law under Greene C. Bronson and Samuel Beardsley, he was admitted to the bar in 1830. Alongside his brother, George W. Peckham, and brother-in-law, Joseph Colt, he opened a successful private law firm.

== Political career ==
Appointed by Governor William L. Marcy, Peckham served as the district attorney of Albany County from 1838 to 1841. In 1845, Peckham ran for Attorney General of New York, but he lost the New York State Legislature's vote to John Van Buren.

Peckham was elected as a Democrat to the United States House of Representatives from New York's 14th District, serving in the 33rd United States Congress from March 4, 1853, until March 3, 1855. During his term, he was the chairman of the House Committee on Revolutionary Claims. Additionally, Peckham was a vocal opponent of the 1854 Kansas–Nebraska Act for violating the terms of the 1820 Missouri Compromise.

== Judicial career ==
Peckham returned to legal practice in a partnership with Judge Lyman Tremain until he was elected to serve as a justice of the New York Supreme Court for the Third Judicial District from 1861 until 1869. He then sat as an associate judge on the New York Court of Appeals from May 17, 1870, until his death.

== Personal life ==
=== Family ===
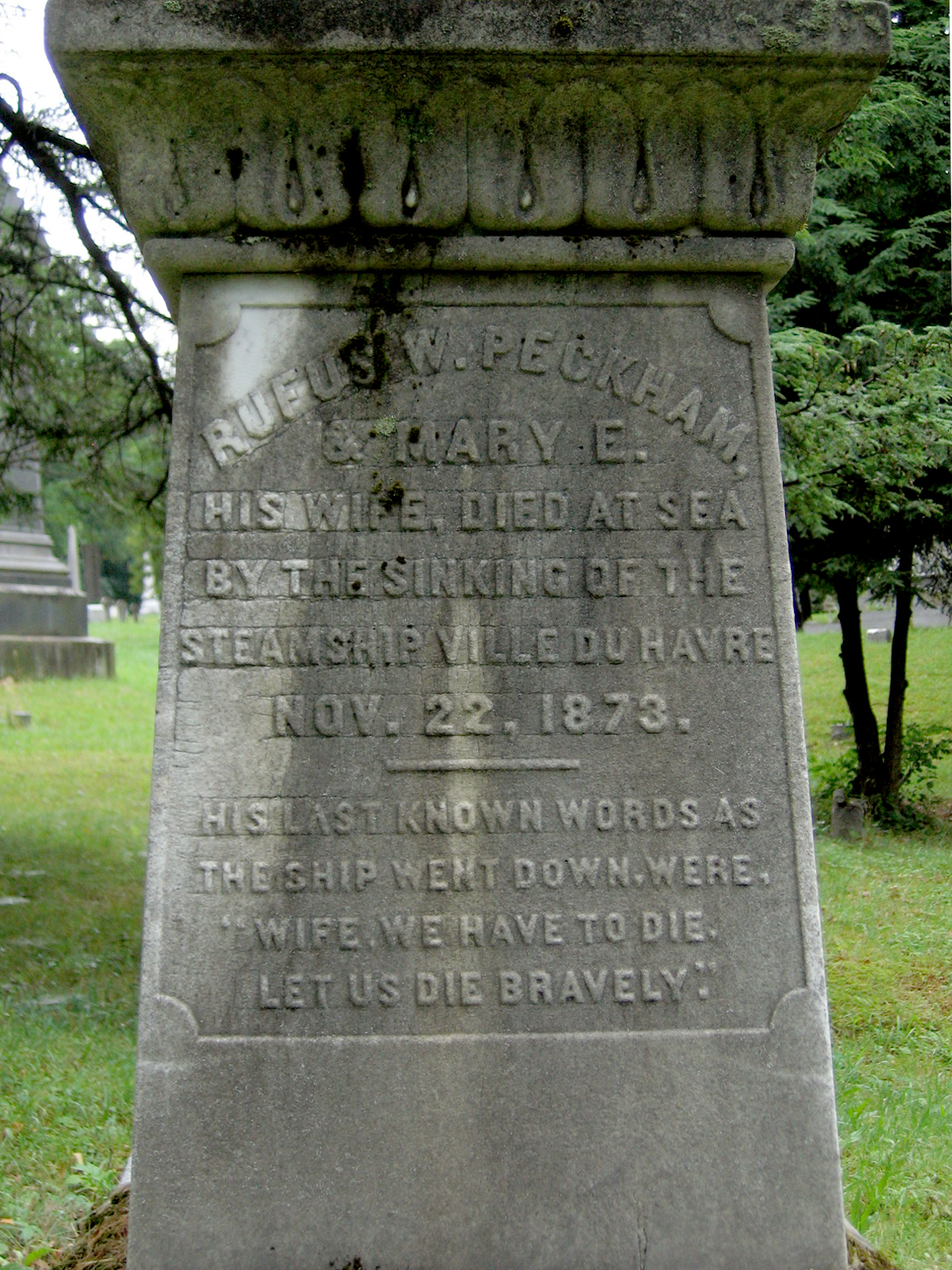
Inscription on Peckham's cenotaph at Albany Rural Cemetery

Peckham had three sons by his first wife, Isabella Adoline Lacey, who died on April 4, 1848, at the age of 35. Rufus Wheeler Peckham (1838–1909) followed in his namesake father's footsteps as a lawyer and in three of the positions that his father had held in New York: as the Albany district attorney (1869–1872), as a New York Supreme Court judge (1883–1886), and as a judge on the New York Court of Appeals (1886–1895). He remarried to Mary Elizabeth Foote (1830–1873).

The younger Peckham never went into Congress, however, but served on the Supreme Court of the United States from 1895 until his death. Peckham's oldest son, Wheeler Hazard Peckham (1833–1905), was also a lawyer who practiced in New York City. Wheeler was also nominated to the U.S. Supreme Court but the Senate failed to confirm him. Peckham had another son named Joseph Henry, who died at the age of 17 on April 2, 1852.

=== Death ===
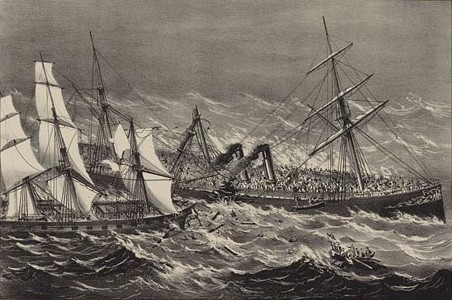
Sinking of the SS Ville du Havre

Peckham and his second wife, Mary, were among 226 passengers and crew of the steamer SS Ville du Havre lost at sea, while the couple were en route to southern France to improve his failing health. The ship sank after colliding with the Scottish vessel Loch Earn in the north Atlantic Ocean on November 22, 1873; Peckham's last words were reported to be, "Wife, we have to die, let us die bravely." His remains were never recovered, and a cenotaph was erected at Albany Rural Cemetery in Menands, New York.

Upon Peckham's death, the New York State Bar Association published a book compiling remembrances held at the New York Court of Appeals, state bar association, New York City courts, Rensselaer County bar association, Greene County bar association, and various courthouses across New York State.

== See also ==
- Albany and Susquehanna Railroad
- Erie War
- George G. Barnard

U.S. House of Representatives
Preceded by John H. Boyd	Member of the U.S. House of Representatives from New York's 14th congressional district March 4, 1853 – March 3, 1855	Succeeded by Samuel Dickson
