= Ethelbert Watts =

American diplomat (1846–1919)

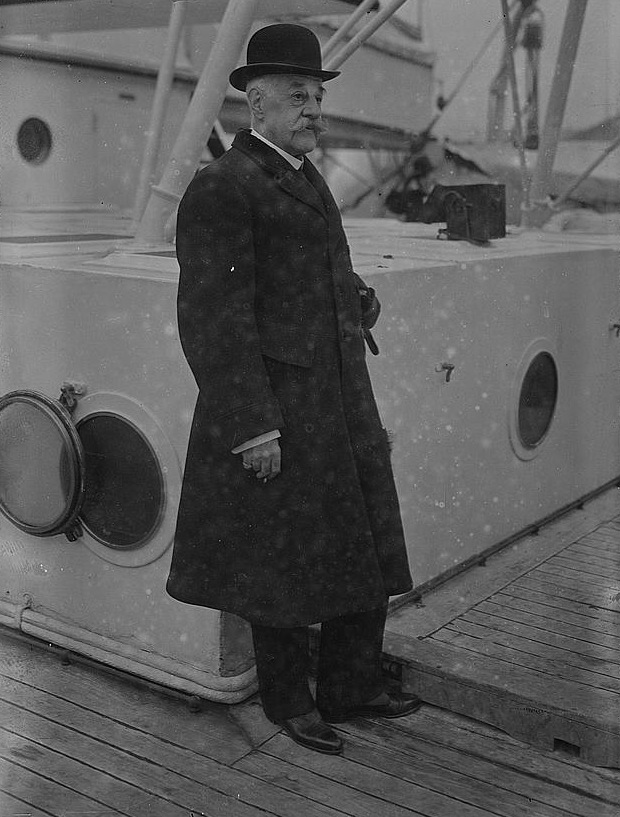
Ethelbert Watts (1917)

Ethelbert Watts (February 25, 1846 – July 13, 1919) was a United States diplomat for over twenty-four years, who played important roles in the Spanish–American War, Russo-Japanese War, and World War I.

== Early life ==
Watts was born in Philadelphia on February 25, 1846. He was the second son of United States Minister to Austria Henry Miller Watts and the former Anna Maria Schoenberger. He was the nephew of Frederick Watts, who was President Ulysses S. Grant's Commissioner of Agriculture (and the first president of the board of trustees of what is now Penn State University). He was a great-grandson of Revolutionary War brigadier-general Frederick Watts, and also of lieutenant colonel Henry Miller (1751–1824), who led colonial army units in the siege of Boston and the engagements of Long Island, White Plains, Trenton, Princeton, Brandywine, Germantown and Monmouth.

Ethelbert was educated in Paris, then at the University of Pennsylvania. His junior year at Penn was interrupted in 1863 by Robert E. Lee's invasion of Pennsylvania in the Civil War. He enlisted as private in Company D, Thirty-second Regiment, Pennsylvania Volunteers. Only seventeen years old, his service was limited to the 32nd Regiment Emergency Militia Infantry, which existed from June 26 to August 1, 1863, and performed duties in the Department of the Susquehanna until Lee was driven from the Commonwealth after the Battle of Gettysburg.

== Career ==
After graduating from Penn he studied at the Royal Saxon School of Mines, Freiberg, Saxony. Returning to Philadelphia, he was engaged in the iron business in which his father had extensive interests. Henry M. Watts & Sons became the owners of Marietta Furnace No. 2 in Marietta, Pennsylvania.

In March 1896 (at age fifty), Watts entered the foreign service of the United States. President Grover Cleveland appointed him to his first post, at Horgen, Switzerland.

=== Spanish–American War ===
The next year Watts was appointed vice and deputy consul-general at Cairo, Egypt, where he was in charge during the Spanish–American War. While there he was instrumental in preventing the Spanish fleet, under Admiral Camara, from coaling at Port Said, before hurrying through the Suez Canal to attack Admiral Dewey's fleet at Manila Bay. Watts dissuaded Evelyn Baring, 1st Earl of Cromer, the British counsel-general in Egypt, from permitting Cámara to coal around Egypt from Spanish colliers, while at the same time acquiring a lien over coal available in Suez from other sources. The Spanish fleet's inability to obtain coal in Egypt resulted in the fleet being ordered back to Spain. Before leaving this post, he was decorated by the Khedive with the Order of Osmanieh. During the next two years he was consul-general at Kingston, Jamaica, and from there went to Prague, Bohemia.

=== Russo-Japanese war ===
While at Prague he accepted the position of consul-general at St. Petersburg, which was then the capital of the Russian Empire and its largest city. He served there from 1903 to 1907, a turbulent period that included the Russo-Japanese War and the Revolution of 1905. In recognition of his services in protecting Japanese interests in Russia during that war, he was decorated by the Emperor of Japan with the Order of the Rising Sun and with that of the Sacred Treasure.

=== World War I ===
From April 1907 to April 1917, he was consul-general at Brussels, Belgium. World War I raged during the last two and one-half years of that period, when the German Empire occupied Brussels and much of Belgium. Both before and after the German occupation, Mr. Watts was instrumental in protecting the interests of American citizens, as well as representing and caring for British and Japanese interests and those of other belligerents. When the United States entered the war in 1917 all consular offices in German-occupied Belgium were discontinued, and Mr. Watts was ordered home.

He was acting consul at Halifax, Nova Scotia (in maritime Canada), on December 6, 1917, when the SS Mont-Blanc, a vessel loaded with munitions, exploded in the harbor, razing a large section of the city. The U.S. consular offices, located within three blocks of the waterfront, were wrecked, but Watts managed to survive because, at the time of the explosion, he was late for work.

== Personal life ==
In 1871, Watts wed Emily Pepper, daughter of Dr. William Pepper, Sr. and sister of Dr. William Pepper, Jr. of Philadelphia. They had four children:

- Ethel Constance Watts (1872–1964), who married Francis Chambers Harris in 1895. After his death in 1904, she married Victor Clark Mellen, a son of William Proctor Mellen, in 1906.
- Marian Watts
- Henry Miller Watts (1875–1959), who married Laura Barney (1878–1950), a daughter of Charles D. Barney (founder of present day Smith Barney) and granddaughter of financier Jay Cooke.
- William Carleton Watts (1880–1956), who became a U.S. Navy Rear Admiral.

After the death of his wife in 1885, Watts married Katharine L. Gregg in 1895. They had two children:

- Frances Watts, who married Theodosius Stevens.
- Ethelbert Watts, Jr. (1902–1966), who became an intelligence officer during World War II and military liaison officer during the Cold War.

In May, 1918, he was appointed consul-general at Hamilton, Bermuda. His health began to fail while at this post. He died July 13, 1919, in Philadelphia.

=== Descendants ===
His great-granddaughter is actress Elizabeth McGovern.
