= George Rex Andrews =

American politician (1808–1873)

Member of the U.S. House of Representatives from New York's 14th district
- In office March 4, 1849 – March 3, 1851
- Preceded by: Orlando Kellogg
- Succeeded by: John H. Boyd

Personal details
- Born: September 21, 1808 Ticonderoga, New York
- Died: December 5, 1873 (aged 65) Oshkosh, Wisconsin
- Resting place: Riverside Cemetery (Oshkosh)
- Party: Whig
- Education: Albany Law School
- Profession: Attorney; politician; lumberman

George Rex Andrews (September 21, 1808 – December 5, 1873) was a U.S. representative from New York.

== Biography ==
Born in Ticonderoga, New York, Andrews attended the common schools and graduated from the Albany Law School. He was admitted to the bar in 1836 and commenced the practice of law in Ticonderoga.

== Career ==
Andrews was elected as a Whig to the Thirty-first Congress and served from March 4, 1849, to March 3, 1851.

After his single term in Congress, Andrews abandoned politics and the legal profession altogether and moved to Oshkosh, Wisconsin, in 1852 and engaged in the timber and lumber business until his death.

== Death ==
Anderson died in Oshkosh, Wisconsin, on December 5, 1873,(age 65 years, 72 days). He is interred at Riverside Cemetery in Oshkosh.

U.S. House of Representatives
Preceded by Orlando Kellogg	Member of the U.S. House of Representatives from New York's 14th congressional district March 4, 1849 – March 3, 1851	Succeeded by John H. Boyd
