= Lemmon v. New York =

Nineteenth-century freedom suit

- Court: New York Court of Appeals
- Decided: March 1860
- Citation: 20 N.Y. 562 (1860)

Court membership
- Judges sitting: George F. Comstock (chief), Henry E. Davies, Samuel Lee Selden, Hiram Denio, William B. Wright (acting), Thomas W. Clerke (acting), William J. Bacon (acting), Henry Welles (acting)

Case opinions
- Decision by: Denio, Wright
- Concurrence: Davis, Bacon, Welles
- Dissent: Clerke, Comstock

Keywords
- Habeas corpus; slavery

Lemmon v. New York, or Lemmon v. The People (1860), popularly known as the Lemmon Slave Case, was a freedom suit initiated in 1852 by a petition for a writ of habeas corpus. The petition was granted by the Superior Court in New York City, a decision upheld by the New York Court of Appeals, New York's highest court, in 1860 on the eve of the Civil War.

The decision mandated the release of eight slaves, including six children, brought into New York by their Virginia slave owners, Jonathan and Juliet Lemmon, who were in transit while relocating to Texas. New York had abolished slavery gradually beginning in 1799, freeing all remaining slaves on July 4, 1827. An 1841 state law explicitly prohibited slaveholders from bringing slaves in transit to the state, liberating any slaves so brought.

Attorney John Jay (1817–1894) represented the state in the 1852 case. Future President Chester A. Arthur represented the state on appeal by the former slaveowners. Counsel to him were William M. Evarts, Joseph Blunt, and Erastus D. Culver.

== Background ==
Banking, shipping, and other major commercial interests in New York City had ties to the South, to slavery, and to cotton, textiles, and other industries dependent on slavery. Southern planters and businessmen traveled there regularly and had their own favorite hotels.

In 1799, New York passed a gradual abolition statute and in 1817, New York passed a law freeing all slaves in the state on July 4, 1827. The 1817 law stated:

No person held as a slave shall be imported, introduced, or brought into this State on any pretence whatever ... . Every such person shall be free. ...

However, under the 1799 law, New York allowed masters to visit the state with their slaves for up to nine months.

Abolitionists in the city included activists who maintained informal escape routes known as the Underground Railroad. John Jay (1817–1894) was prominent among them and the city's leading lawyer for the defense in fugitive slave cases. (Jay's grandfather, for whom he was named, was the diplomat for the Continental Congress; during the George Washington administration, he served as Governor of New York and as first Chief Justice of the United States.) The 1850 federal law required even the law enforcement of free states to support the capture and return of fugitive slaves.

Louis Napoleon, an illiterate former slave who became a furniture polisher and porter, was active in aiding escaped slaves' efforts to gain freedom via the Underground Railroad. He also directed cases of slaves brought to the state to John Jay for litigation as freedom suits. Napoleon signed the petition for writ of habeas corpus in the Lemmon case.

== Events ==
Jonathan Lemmon and his wife Juliet were residents of Virginia who had decided to migrate to Texas. In November 1852, the Lemmons travelled by steamship City of Richmond from Norfolk, Virginia to New York City, where they were to embark on another steamship for the trip by sea to Texas. The Lemmons had brought with them eight slaves belonging to Mrs. Lemmon. They made up two family groups, each headed by a young woman: the first was Emiline (age 23), Edward (age 13), brother of Emiline; and Amanda (age 2), daughter of Emiline. The second was Nancy (age 20); Lewis (age 16), brother of Nancy; Lewis and Edward (age 7), sons of Nancy; and Ann (age 5), daughter of Nancy. The older members of the groups served the Lemmons as domestic slaves. While the Lemmons awaited the ship to Texas, they placed their slaves in a boarding house at No. 3 Carlisle Street and booked another hotel for themselves.

Louis Napoleon, a free African-American resident of New York and activist with the Underground Railroad, was alerted to the arrival of the slaves by a black porter at the boarding house about the slaves who had been brought there. Black citizens of New York regularly aided slaves brought to the city to gain freedom by force of state law.

On 6 November 1852, Napoleon presented a petition to Judge Elijah Paine Jr., of the Superior Court of New York City, for a writ of habeas corpus that would effectively emancipate the slaves. The petition was based on the 1841 New York law noted above that said any slave brought into the state was immediately free.

Mr. Lemmon's attorneys objected. They asserted that the Lemmons were transporting their slaves from Virginia to Texas, claiming this was an action of interstate commerce, as slaves were considered property in southern states. They cited the United States Supreme Court's ruling in Gibbons v. Ogden (1824) that states had no power to regulate interstate commerce, as that power was granted to the federal government.

The state of New York designated lawyers to appear in support of the petition, including John Jay, Erastus D. Culver, and Chester Alan Arthur. They argued that the U.S. Constitution granted limited powers to the federal government, and those powers not granted were reserved for the states. The Fugitive Slave Act of 1850 and the Supreme Court's precedent in Prigg v. Pennsylvania (1842) prohibited the states from interfering in the return of fugitive slaves. But New York argued that this explicit requirement implicitly excluded any requirement for states to return non-fugitive slaves, by the principle expressio unius exclusio alterius ("the express mention of one thing excludes others").

== Proceedings and fate of the slaves ==
On November 13, 1852, Judge Paine held that the Lemmons were not required to travel to Texas via New York. Thus, they had chosen to bring their slaves to New York, knowing it was a free state. Thus, the slaves were free according to New York state law forbidding bringing slaves "in transit" into the state. Paine relied on the English precedent set in Somersett v. Stewart (1772), where the Court of King's Bench declared that only positive law could uphold slavery and that, since England had no laws upholding slavery, slaves entering English territory became free.

After his decision, Judge Paine organized a group of business leaders to pay Lemmon $5,000, and Lemmon agreed that if a higher court reversed the ruling and awarded him the slaves, he would manumit them. When the case reached the New York Court of Appeals, John Jay II submitted an amicus curiae brief arguing that, inasmuch as Lemmon suffered no loss, he had no justiciable controversy.

The slaves now having been freed, Louis Napoleon organized a meeting with local Underground Railroad leaders. They agreed to have fugitive slave Richard Johnson act as a guide and take the newly freed men and women to North Buxton, a freedmen's neighborhood in Canada. One of the Lemmon freedmen quickly left Canada and moved to Michigan, and his descendants live in Lansing, Michigan as of 2023.

The State of Virginia assisted Lemmon in his appeal to the New York Supreme Court which granted certiorari. The court affirmed Justice Paine in December 1857 with one dissent. Lemmon appealed again, to the New York Court of Appeals (the state's highest appellate court). The jurists who heard the case included Court of Appeals judges George F. Comstock (chief), Henry E. Davies, Samuel Lee Selden, and Hiram Denio, as well as four supreme court judges acting as appeals court judges; William B. Wright, Thomas W. Clerke, William J. Bacon, and Henry Welles. The appeals court affirmed by a vote of 5–2 in March 1860, holding that the slaves were free. Denio and Wright offered written opinions in favor of affirming, and were joined by Davis, Bacon, and Welles. Clerke prepared a written dissent, while Comstock dissented with only a brief paragraph of explanation. Selden objected briefly in writing to hearing the case at all and did not vote.

The Lemmons assigned their rights to the State of Virginia, which had planned to appeal to the Supreme Court of the United States. By then the American Civil War had begun and the case was never heard.

== Reaction ==
Shortly after reporting the decision of the Court of Appeals, The New York Times published an article criticizing the opinions of the two dissenting judges in the Lemmon case. First it addressed judicial decisions in general, including in the South, saying that the country's polarization on slavery was resulting in biased decisions by judges. It noted that cases were being decided against free blacks and against the ability of owners to free slaves by will, because opinions were overriding precedent. It said

"judges are gradually giving way to the pressure of one side or other, and ceasing even to pretend to administer the law as they find it, or to stand by the old rules of interpretation in any case in which the interests of slaveholders are involved." Although the piece noted that in the North, "the evil has been less apparent," preferring errors that favored freedom rather than slavery, decisions based on the Fugitive Slave Law "have at least rarely been illustrations of judicial wisdom, moderation, and impartiality."

The article reviewed Comstock's brief dissent and Selden's objection to hearing the case. Both had noted that they had not time to give the case thorough consideration. Comstock argued that the New York statute prohibiting slaveowners from bringing slaves in transit into the state, violated "the rules of justice and comity" that ought to regulate intercourse among the states. The Times said the judges had overstepped their bounds by creating a new standard: "If this rule does not arm judges with legislative power, we should like to hear of some other plan which does it more effectually."

While Lemmon was still pending, United States Supreme Court Justice Samuel Nelson, from New York, "had hinted at constitutional restraints upon State power over slavery" in his concurrence to Scott v. Sandford. Nelson noted that the question of slaveholders' right to take slaves into or through free states had not been under consideration in Dred Scott:

"A question has been alluded to, on the argument, namely: the right of the master with his slave of transit into or through a free State, on business or commercial pursuits, or in the exercise of a Federal right, or the discharge of a Federal duty, being a citizen of the United States, which is not before us. This question depends upon different considerations and principles from the one in hand, and turns upon the rights and privileges secured to a common citizen of the republic under the Constitution of the United States. When that question arises, we shall be prepared to decide it."

Don E. Fehrenbaccher later suggested that Nelson thought the Supreme Court might be required to rule on the issue of slaves carried to free states.

Lincoln's House Divided Speech on 1858 outlined the threat if the Supreme Court followed thinking related to Dred Scott when ruling on the right of states to regulate slavery:

"The nearest approach to the point of declarating the power of a state over slavery, is made by Judge Nelson. He approaches it more than once, using the precise idea, and almost the language too, of the Nebraska Act. On one occasion, his exact language is 'except in cases where the power is restrained by the Constitution of the United States, the law of the State is supreme over the subject of slavery within its jurisdiction.' In what cases the power of the states is so restrained by the U.S. Constitution, is left an open question, precisely as the question as to the power of the territories was left open in the Nebraska Act. Put that and that together, and we have a nice little niche, which we may, ere long, see filled with another Supreme Court decision, declaring that the Constitution of the United States does not permit a state to exclude slavery from its limits."

As noted, the outbreak of war meant that the Supreme Court never heard Virginia's appeal of the Lemmon case.

Historian Paul Finkelman noted in his book on the history of slave transit in the North that "Lemmon was the culmination of a long and intense conflict over the place of slavery within the legal framework of the Union." Finkelman also noted that Lemmon was "part of the larger social and political movements that ultimately led to the Republican party, the Civil War, and Constitutional amendments ending slavery and making blacks full-fledged citizens." The importance of Lemmon was clear to the South. In explaining why it was leaving the Union, the South Carolina Secession Convention noted: "In the State of New York even the right of transit for a slave has been denied by her tribunals."

Years later Chester A. Arthur took credit for promoting the rights of slaves (and the state) in this case. Historian Thomas C. Reeves said that Arthur did not contribute work that was any more important than that of John Jay (who sponsored the case and designed the strategy), or William M. Evarts, who argued it in the Court of Appeals. But they were not political candidates.

== See also ==
- American slave court cases
- Freedom suits
- Chester A. Arthur
- Dred Scott v. Sandford
- William M. Evarts
