= USS Raleigh (CL-7) =

Omaha-class light cruiser

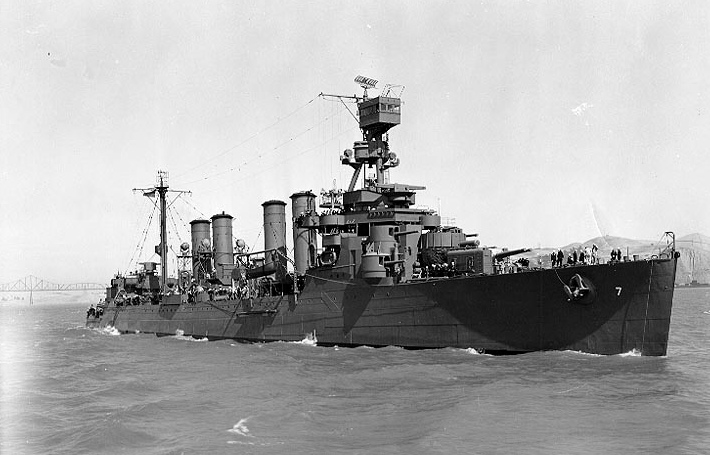
- USS Raleigh (July 1942)

History

United States
- Name: Raleigh
- Namesake: City of Raleigh, North Carolina
- Ordered: 29 August 1916
- Awarded: 21 August 1917; 12 June 1919 (supplementary contract)
- Builder: Bethlehem Shipbuilding Corporation's Fore River Shipyard, Quincy, Massachusetts
- Laid down: 16 August 1920
- Launched: 25 October 1922
- Sponsored by: Miss Jennie Proctor
- Completed: 1 August 1921
- Commissioned: 6 February 1924
- Decommissioned: 2 November 1945
- Stricken: 28 November 1945
- Identification: Hull symbol: CL-7; Code letters: NIRT
- Honors and awards: 3 × battle star
- Fate: Sold for scrap, 27 February 1946

General characteristics (as built)
- Class & type: Omaha-class light cruiser
- Displacement: 7,500 long tons (7,620 t) (standard); 9,508 long tons (9,661 t) (full load)
- Length: 555 ft 6 in (169.32 m) oa; 550 ft (170 m) pp
- Beam: 55 ft (17 m)
- Draft: 14 ft 3 in (4.34 m) (mean)
- Installed power: 12 × Yarrow boiler; 90,000 shp (67,000 kW) (designed horse power)
- Propulsion: 4 × Curtis steam turbines; 4 × screws
- Speed: 35 kn (65 km/h; 40 mph) (designed speed); 33.7 kn (62.4 km/h; 38.8 mph) (Estimated speed on Trial)
- Crew: 29 officers 429 enlisted (peace time)
- Armament: 2 × twin 6 in (152 mm)/53 caliber guns; 8 × single 6 in/53 caliber guns; 2 × 3 in (76 mm)/50 caliber anti-aircraft guns; 2 × triple 21 in (533 mm) torpedo tubes; 2 × twin 21 in torpedo tubes; 224 × mines
- Armor: Belt: 3 in (76 mm); Deck: 1 1/2 in (38 mm); Conning Tower: 1 1/2 in; Bulkheads: 1 1/2-3 in
- Aircraft carried: 2 × Curtiss SOC Seagulls and later 2 × Vought OS2U Kingfishers
- Aviation facilities: 2 × Amidship catapults; crane

General characteristics (1945)
- Armament: 2 × twin 6 in/53 caliber; 6 × single 6 in/53 caliber; 8 × 3 in/50 caliber anti-aircraft guns; 2 × triple 21 in torpedo tubes; 3 × twin 40 mm (1.6 in) Bofors guns; 8 × single 20 mm (0.79 in) Oerlikon cannons

USS Raleigh (CL-7) was the fourth Omaha-class light cruiser, originally classified as a scout cruiser, built for the United States Navy. She was the second Navy ship named for the city of Raleigh, North Carolina, the first being the protected cruiser Raleigh, commissioned in 1894, and decommissioned in 1919.

Raleigh spent most of her pre-war career in the Atlantic. Her first duty was to assist in the USAAS's first aerial circumnavigation of the world in 1924. In 1936, Raleigh joined Squadron 40-T in neutrality patrols during the Spanish Civil War where she would serve until 1938, when she would be transferred to the Pacific. This led her to be fatefully moored in Pearl Harbor at berth F-12 on the morning of 7 December 1941, where she took a torpedo in her No.2 boiler room and claimed five victories with her anti-aircraft batteries with no loss of life.

== Construction and design ==
Raleigh was ordered on 29 August 1916, and contracted to be built by Bethlehem Shipbuilding Corporation's Fore River Shipyard, Quincy, Massachusetts, 21 August 1917. Her keel was laid on 16 August 1920, and launched on 25 October 1922, the cruiser was christened by Miss Jennie Proctor; and commissioned 6 February 1924, with Captain William C. Watts in command.

Raleigh was 550 feet (170 metres) long at the waterline with an overall length of 555 feet 6 inches (169.32 metres), her beam was 55 feet 4 inches (16.87 metres) and a mean draft of 13 feet 6 inches (4.11 metres). Her standard displacement was 7,500 long tons (7,620 t) and 9,508 long tons (9,661 t) at full load. Her crew, during peace time, consisted of 29 officers and 429 enlisted men.

Raleigh was powered by four Curtis steam turbines geared steam turbines, each driving one screw, using steam generated by 12 Yarrow boilers. The engines were designed to produce 90,000 shaft horsepower (67,000 kW) and reach a top speed of 35 knots (65 km/h; 40 mph). She was designed to provide a range of 10,000 nautical miles (19,000 km; 12,000 mi) at a speed of 10 knots (19 km/h; 12 mph), but was only capable of 8,460 nautical miles (15,670 km; 9,740 mi) at a speed of 10 knots (19 km/h; 12 mph)

Raleigh's main armament went through many changes while she was being designed. Originally she was to be mounted by ten 6-inch (150 mm)/53 caliber guns; two on either side at the waist, with the remaining eight mounted in tiered casemates on either side of the fore and aft superstructures. After the United States entry into World War I the US Navy worked alongside the Royal Navy and it was decided to mount four 6-inch/53 caliber guns in two twin gun turrets fore and aft and keep the eight guns in the tiered casemates so that she would have an eight gun broadside and, due to limited arcs of fire from the casemate guns, four to six guns firing fore or aft. Her secondary armament consisted of two 3-inch (76 mm)/50 caliber anti-aircraft (AA) guns in single mounts. Raleigh was initially built with the capacity to carry 224 mines, but these were removed early in her career to make way for more crew accommodations. She also carried two triple and two twin, above-water, torpedo tube mounts for 21-inch (533 mm) torpedoes. The triple mounts were fitted on either side of the upper deck, aft of the aircraft catapults, and the twin mounts were one deck lower on either side, covered by hatches in the side of the hull.

The ship lacked a full-length waterline armor belt. The sides of her boiler and engine rooms and steering gear were protected by three inches of armor. The transverse bulkheads at the end of her machinery rooms were one and a half inches (38 mm) thick forward and three inches thick aft. The conning tower and the deck over the machinery spaces and steering gear had one and a half inches of armor. The gun turrets were not armored and only provided protection against muzzle blast.

Raleigh carried two floatplanes aboard that were stored on the two catapults. Initially these were Vought VE-9s, then Vought UO-1s, the ship then operated Curtiss SOC Seagulls from 1935, and Vought OS2U Kingfishers after 1940.

=== Armament changes ===
During her career Raleigh went through several armament changes. Some of these changes were to reduce weight, but others were to increase her AA armament. On 8 September 1926, the Chief of Naval Operations, Admiral Edward W. Eberle, along with the Commanders in Chief of the United States Fleet and Battle Fleet, and their subordinate commanding officers, the Secretary of the Navy, Curtis D. Wilbur, ordered that all mines and the tracks for laying the mines be removed from all of the Omaha-class cruisers, the working conditions had been found to be very "wet". Another change made before the war was to increase the 3-inch guns to eight, all mounted in the ship's waist. After 1940 the lower aft 6-inch guns were removed and the casemates plated over for the same reason as the lower torpedo mounts. The ship's anti-aircraft armament were augmented by three twin 40 mm (1.6 in) Bofors guns along with eight 20 mm (0.79 in) Oerlikon cannons by the end of the war.

== Service history ==
=== Inter-war period ===
Raleigh shifted from Quincy to the New York Navy Yard on 26 February 1924, to finish her fitting out. She left on 16 April, for her shakedown cruise off of the Virginia Capes. She finished her final building yard alterations at Quincy, on 24 June. Raleigh then transferred to Provincetown, Massachusetts, where she stayed until 30 July, when she joined the Light Cruiser Division, Scouting Fleet, in northern European waters for duty in connection with the United States Army Air Service's "World Flight". After calling at ports in Norway, Denmark, and Scotland, she took up her reconnaissance station on 31 July, off Hvalfjörður, Iceland. On 10 August, she shifted her station to the east coast of Greenland. Upon completion of her duty with the flight operations, on 3 September, she set sail for the Boston Navy Yard, for voyage repairs.

The Raleigh during a goodwill visit to Sweden moored in Stockholm harbor, late July 1929.

Raleigh set out from Boston Harbor, on 16 October 1924, for maneuvers again off of the Virginia Capes. This was followed by operations and battle problems off Panama, California, and the Hawaiian Islands. Steaming from Honolulu, on 10 June 1925, she docked at San Diego, with the Scouting Fleet, before her return to the Boston Navy Yard, on 13 July. Raleigh would continue to operate out of Boston, for the next two years, spending most of the winter months with the Scouting Force in Cuban and Panamanian waters.

Raleigh sailed from Boston Harbor, on 1 February 1927. She embarked two detachments of Marines at Charleston, South Carolina. After first participating in maneuvers at Guantanamo Bay, Cuba, she transited the Panama Canal for Corinto, Nicaragua. Raleigh arrived on 5 February, and on 19 February, along with her sister ship Milwaukee, landed the Marines, who were needed to deal with the bandit-plagued countryside. The cruiser stood by for possible assistance until 23 March, when she returned to Boston, and resumed Atlantic coastal operations.

During the spring of 1928, Raleigh operated off the California coast and in Hawaiian waters, returning to Boston on 26 June to prepare for European duty. Departing on 17 August, she steamed for Hampton Roads, Va., where, on 15 September, she relieved Detroit as flagship of Vice Admiral John H. Dayton, commander, Naval Forces, Europe.

After touching at Boston, Raleigh made diplomatic calls to many principal European ports before returning to Hampton Roads, Virginia, on 4 September 1929. The next day, she hauled down the flag of Vice Admiral Dayton.

Raleigh then rejoined Cruiser Division 3 (CruDiv 3) of the Scouting Force, operating for the next few years out of Boston for battle practice, maneuvers, and port calls. Based at San Diego, California, on 15 August 1933, she trained off the California coast, with occasional runs to the Caribbean, as well as to Alaskan and Hawaiian waters. She departed San Diego on 27 April 1936 in company with the US Fleet, transited the Panama Canal, touched at Charleston, South Carolina, and entered the Norfolk Navy Yard on 15 June for overhaul.

As Raleigh repaired in the Norfolk Navy Yard, Squadron 40-T, a special temporary squadron, was organized for duty in Spanish waters to evacuate American nationals from the Spanish Civil War areas. Rear Admiral Arthur P. Fairfield broke his flag in Raleigh at Norfolk on 17 September 1936. The next day, the cruiser steamed independently for Gibraltar, arriving on 27 September. Kane, Hatfield and USCGC Cayuga, in company with Raleigh, initially comprised the squadron. Together, the ships saved hundreds of Americans and other nationals from the dangers of the war in Spain.

Omaha relieved Raleigh at Villefranche on 28 April 1938, and two days later, Raleigh headed for Hampton Roads for overhaul in the Norfolk Navy Yard, arriving on 13 May.

Raleigh was next assigned to Flotilla One, Destroyer Squadron, US Battle Force. Clearing Norfolk on 16 August, she trained at Guantanamo Bay and then arrived at her new base of San Diego on 5 September. In early 1939, she participated in the fleet problem in the Caribbean, returning to San Diego in May to resume coastal operations. Next assigned to the Hawaiian Detachment, Raleigh steamed for Pearl Harbor on 5 October. As the flagship of Destroyer Flotilla One, she engaged in fleet maneuvers which took her from the central Pacific to the California coast.

=== World War II ===
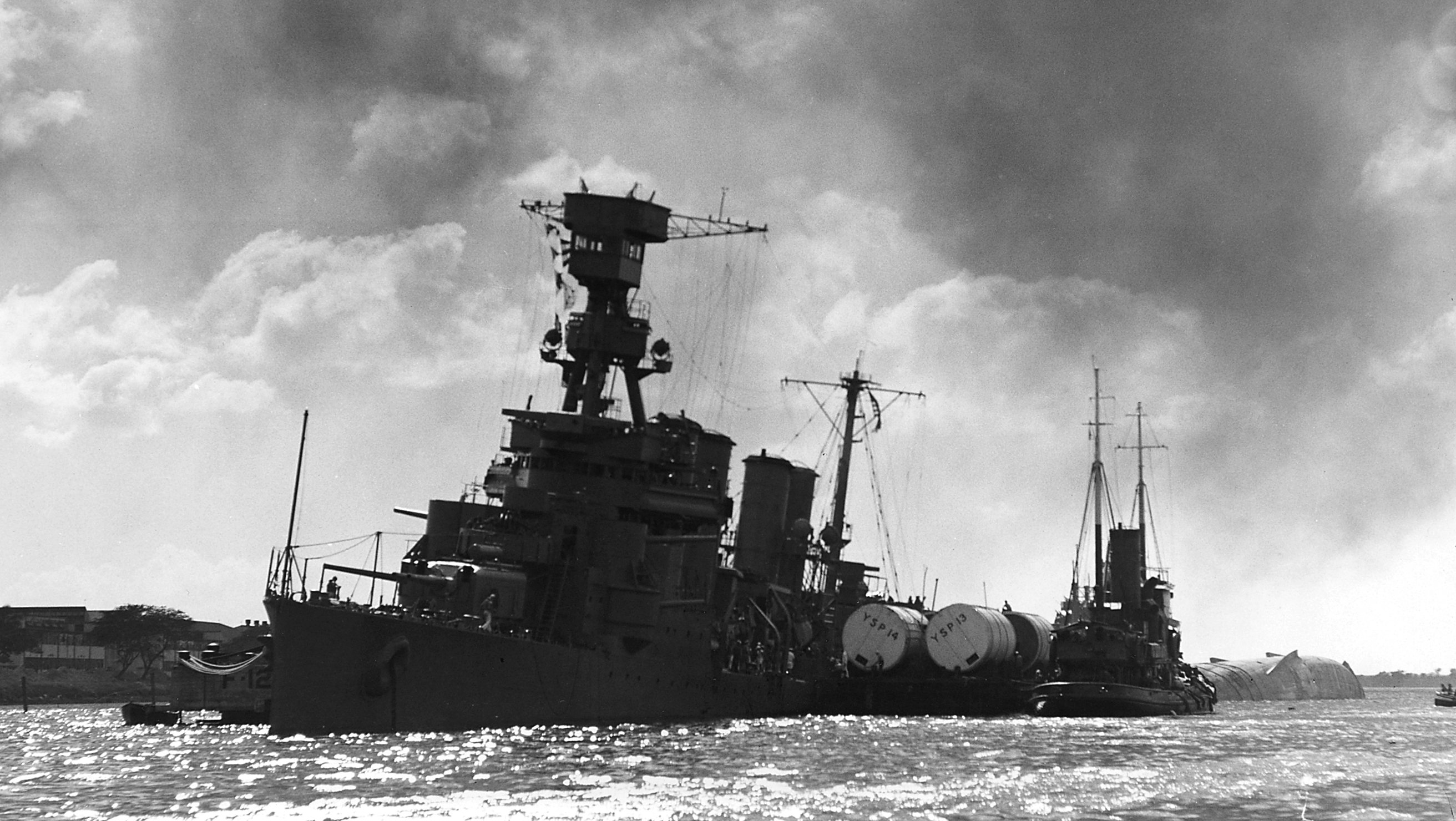
Raleigh listing after the torpedo hit at Pearl Harbor. The capsized hull of USS Utah can be seen in the right background.

Raleigh was moored at berth F-12, on the east side of the north channel at Pearl Harbor, when the Japanese made their surprise attack. In the first attack wave a torpedo passed ahead and a second hit Raleigh portside amidships. The cruiser took such a list to port that it appeared she might capsize. As crew jettisoned topside weight to keep her upright, her gunners helped to destroy five Japanese planes. Several of her crew were wounded, but none were killed.

The next day, yard craft and Whitney came alongside to render assistance, and Raleigh was towed into the Navy Yard for repairs on 22 December. She departed Pearl Harbor on 21 February 1942 as an escort of a five-ship convoy which arrived in San Francisco on 1 March. After overhaul at Mare Island, she cleared San Francisco Bay on 23 July as a unit of Task Force 15 (TF 15) assigned to convoy escort duty between San Francisco, Hawaii, Samoa and the Fiji Islands.

Raleigh steamed from Pago Pago on 3 November to search out and destroy four Japanese picket ships reportedly operating between the Gilbert and Ellice Islands. Finding no trace of the enemy, she touched at Pearl Harbor from 13 to 17 November, then steamed independently to Dutch Harbor, Unalaska, Aleutians, arriving on 24 November. The following months were spent searching for enemy ships carrying reinforcements in the Rat and Near Islands and escorting troop and supply ships between Dutch Harbor and Kulak Bay.

Raleigh put to sea on 10 January 1943, with Task Group 8.6 (TG 8.6) to cover the occupation of Amchitka Island. On 12 January, she conducted patrols off Amchitka, with infrequent sweeps off Kiska with her task group. Detached from the group on 10 February, she convoyed ships between Dutch Harbor and Kulak Bay, then entered Puget Sound Navy Yard on 23 March for repairs.

Sailing on 22 April, she arrived Adak on the 28th and joined TG 16.6, patrolling the approaches to the Near Islands and covering the southern approach to Kiska. Raleigh participated in the bombardment of Kiska on 2 August, blasting targets in Gertrude Cove, and shelled enemy positions again on 12 August, before heading for San Francisco and overhaul.

Raleigh stood out of San Francisco Bay on 15 September and resumed support of operations in the Aleutians, sweeping the ocean from Kiska to west of Attu. As part of TG 94.6, she steamed from Massacre Bay, Attu on 1 February 1944 to bombard enemy installations in Kurabu Zaki, Paramushiru in the Northern Kuriles. In the early morning darkness of 4 February, she took her bombardment station off that enemy shore to blast an area where two dual-purpose batteries were located. She also took an airfield under fire, destroying a hangar and several barracks buildings. Her gunners also scored hits on a small merchant ship anchored inshore. After touching at Attu on 5 February, Raleigh returned to Puget Sound Navy Yard on 1 March for a three-month overhaul.

Joining TF 94 at Massacre Bay in the Aleutian Islands on 6 June, she suffered a casualty to her number two main engine while en route to Matsuwa Island. After repairs at Puget Sound, Raleigh departed Seattle on 22 June 1945, touched at San Pedro, California, thence proceeded via the Panama Canal to Hampton Roads and then to her new home port of Norfolk, Virginia.

Calling at Annapolis, Maryland, on 1 July 1945, she conducted two midshipman training cruises, in the Caribbean and along the east coast.

== Fate ==
Raleigh entered to the Philadelphia Navy Yard on 29 September 1945, was decommissioned there on 2 November, and was struck from the Naval Vessel Register on 28 November. Her hulk was sold for scrap at Philadelphia on 27 February 1946.

== Notable commanders ==
Name	Date	Final rank attained
Captain William Carlton Watts	6 February 1924–December 1925	Rear Admiral

== Awards ==
- American Defense Service Medal with "FLEET" clasp
- American Campaign Medal
- Asiatic-Pacific Campaign Medal with three battle stars for World War II service
- World War II Victory Medal

== Bibliography ==
- "Raleigh III (CL-7)". Dictionary of American Naval Fighting Ships. Naval History and Heritage Command. 26 August 2015. This article incorporates text from this source, which is in the public domain.
- Musicant, Ivan (1990). The Banana Wars: A History of United States Military Intervention in Latin America from the Spanish–American War to the Invasion of Panama. New York: MacMillan Publishing. ISBN 978-0-02-588210-2.
- "Bethlehem Steel Company, Quincy MA". ShipbuildingHistory.com. 2 April 2017.
- "Ships' Data, U. S. Naval Vessels". US Naval Department. 1 July 1921. pp. 54–59.
- Ships' Data, U. S. Naval Vessels. US Naval Department. 1 July 1935. pp. 24–31.
- Terzibashitsch, Stefan (1988). Cruisers of the US Navy 1922-1962. Naval Institute Press. ISBN 0-87021-974-X.
- "USS Raleigh (CL 7)". NavSource. 13 May 2018.
