= John Jay (lawyer) =

American lawyer and diplomat

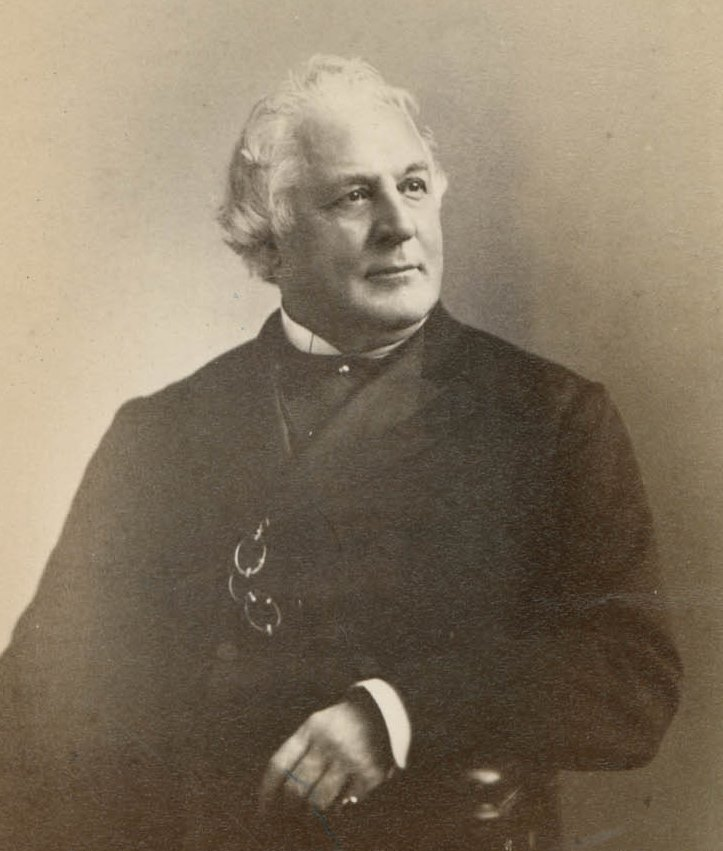

7th United States Minister to Austria-Hungary
- In office June 1, 1869 – March 31, 1875
- President: Ulysses S. Grant
- Preceded by: Henry M. Watts
- Succeeded by: Godlove S. Orth

Personal details
- Born: June 23, 1817 New York City, U.S.
- Died: May 5, 1894 (aged 76) New York City, U.S.
- Party: Free Soil; Republican
- Relations: John Jay (grandfather); John Jay Chapman (grandson)
- Children: 6, including William
- Parents: William Jay; Augusta McVickar Jay
- Education: Columbia College
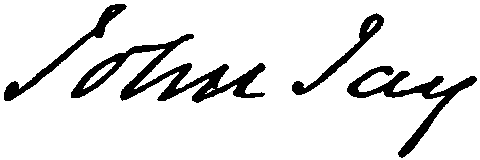
- Signature

John Jay (June 23, 1817 – May 5, 1894) was an American lawyer and diplomat to Austria-Hungary, serving from 1869 to 1875. He was the son of William Jay and a grandson of John Jay, the first Chief Justice of the United States Supreme Court. Jay was active in the anti-slavery movement, elected president of the New York Young Men's Antislavery Society while still in college. He published several speeches and pamphlets on slavery and history, and was elected in 1889 as president of the American Historical Association.

Jay defended numerous fugitive slaves in court and helped several gain freedom. In 1852, Jay led a team of attorneys in New York City in Lemmon v. New York, gaining the freedom of eight Virginia slaves brought to New York by their owners in transit to Texas. The ruling survived appeals through the state courts. In 1854, Jay was among the founders of the Republican Party in the United States. In 1883, he was appointed as the Republican member of the New York Civil Service Commission, founded to reduce patronage and corruption in government, and later was selected as its president.

== Early life ==
John Jay was born in 1817 in New York City to William Jay, an attorney later appointed as judge in Westchester County, and his wife Augusta McVickar Jay.

The young Jay was prepared at Dr. William A. Muhlenberg's highly respected Institute at Flushing, Long Island (Class of 1832). Muhlenberg's pupils often entered higher education as third-year students then distinguished themselves further. Jay completed his degree at Columbia College in 1836, and was admitted to the bar three years later after reading the law.

== Career ==
He early became intensely interested in the anti-slavery movement, much like his father and namesake grandfather.

In 1834, while Jay was still attending college, he became president of the New York Young Men's Antislavery Society. Jay was also active in the Free Soil Party movement, presided at several of its conventions, and was once its candidate for Attorney General of New York.

As an attorney in private practice in New York City, Jay represented a number of fugitive slaves in freedom suits, including George Kirk, three Brazilians, and Henry Long. He gained the freedom of Kirk and the Brazilians (who were aided in escaping by the Underground Railroad before a judge decided in their favor), but Long was returned to Virginia and slavery in 1851.

Long was working in a restaurant after having been a fugitive in New York for several years. As his self-proclaimed owner John T. Smith from Richmond, Virginia, sued for his return under the new Fugitive Slave Act of 1850, Horace Greeley and the American Anti-Slavery Society tried to gain Long's freedom after he was captured. This was one of several test cases of the new law. Fear of its implementation resulted in hundreds of fugitive slaves going to Canada from New York and Massachusetts, as they felt vulnerable to slave catchers. Prominent fugitives and abolitionists Ellen and William Craft migrated from Boston to England to ensure their safety. Long's case was first given to a federal commissioner, newly appointed under the law. He referred it to federal court. Despite the defense by Jay, Judge Judson found in favor of the owner. Many in New York were outraged, and 200 police were called upon to enforce Long's being taken to the ferry for passage to New Jersey, where he was taken by railroad to Virginia. There he was sold to a planter from Georgia and forced to work on a cotton plantation.

In 1852, Jay successfully led a team of attorneys in a freedom suit, Lemmon v. New York, gaining the release in New York City's Superior Court of eight slaves brought to New York by their Virginia owners, who were stopping over in the city prior to sailing to relocate to Texas. New York had passed a law prohibiting slave transit. Like some other free states, New York said that slaves brought voluntarily to the state by their owners in transit would be considered free. A considerable network of black and white activists kept watch for fugitive and transit slaves and took action to free them. In the case of the Lemmon slaves, activist Louis Napoleon, one of an important trio, was alerted and gained a habeas corpus writ requiring them to be presented to court. Jay, Erastus D. Culver and the young Chester A. Arthur (future president of the United States) defended them. The ruling was upheld through two levels of appeals in state courts, the second ruling made in 1860. The case was never heard by the U.S. Supreme Court, because the Civil War broke out.

In 1854, Jay organized the series of popular political meetings in the Broadway Tabernacle. The next year, he was prominently identified with the founding of the Republican Party.

=== U.S. Minister to Austria-Hungary ===
President Ulysses S. Grant appointed Jay as the United States Minister to the Austria-Hungary empire, where he served from 1869 to 1875. In 1877, Secretary of the Treasury John Sherman appointed him chairman of the special commission to investigate Chester A. Arthur's administration of the New York Custom House. In 1883, Democratic Governor Grover Cleveland (later U.S. president) appointed Jay as the Republican member of the New York Civil Service Commission, of which he later became president.

Jay published several speeches and pamphlets on slavery and other issues. He wrote a biographical article for Appletons' Cyclopædia of American Biography about his grandfather, John Jay, the Chief Justice; it included sections on his father and himself. In 1889, he was elected as president of the American Historical Association.

== Personal life ==
In 1837, Jay was married to Eleanor Kingsland Field (1819–1909), daughter of Eleanor and Hickson Woolman Field, and cousin of Benjamin Hazard Field. Hickson was a prominent merchant in New York City. Together, they were the parents of six children, including:

- Eleanor Jay (1839–1921), who married Henry Grafton Chapman Jr., the president of the New York Stock Exchange, and son of abolitionist Maria Weston Chapman.
- William Jay (1841–1915), who married Lucie Oelrichs (1854–1931), sister of Hermann Oelrichs (husband of Theresa Fair Oelrichs), and Charles May Oelrichs (husband of Blanche de Loosey Oelrichs).
- John S. Jay (1842–1843), who died young.
- Augusta Jay (1844–1878), who married Edmund Randolph Robinson, son of prominent civil engineer Moncure Robinson.
- Mary Jay (1846–1916), who married William Henry Schieffelin, son of author Samuel Schieffelin. Their son was William Jay Schieffelin.
- Anna Jay (1849–1925), who married General Hans Lothar von Schweinitz, German Ambassador to St. Petersburg.

Jay died on May 5, 1894, in Manhattan at the age of 76. He was buried in John Jay Cemetery, established for his grandfather and owned by his family in Rye, New York.

== Published works ==
Jay's published works included:

- "America Free, or America Slave" (1856)
- "The Church and the Rebellion" (1863)
- "On the Passage of the Constitutional Amendment abolishing Slavery" (1864)
- "Rome in America" (1868)
- "The American Foreign Service" (1877)
- "The Sunday-School a Safeguard to the Republic"
- "The Fisheries Question"
- "The Public School a Portal to the Civil Service."
