= John H. Boyd (politician) =

American politician

John Huggins Boyd

Member of the U.S. House of Representatives from New York's 14th district
- In office March 4, 1851 – March 3, 1853
- Preceded by: George R. Andrews
- Succeeded by: Rufus W. Peckham

Personal details
- Born: July 31, 1799 Salem, New York
- Died: July 2, 1868 (aged 68) Whitehall, Washington County, New York
- Citizenship: United States
- Party: Whig
- Education: Washington Academy, Salem, New York
- Profession: Attorney; politician; Justice of the Peace

John Huggins Boyd (July 31, 1799 – July 2, 1868) was an American politician and a U.S. Representative from New York. He was the last member of the Whig Party to represent New York's 14th District.

== Biography ==
Born in Salem, New York, Boyd attended the common schools and was graduated from Washington Academy, Salem, New York, in 1818. He studied law and was admitted to the bar in 1823.

== Career ==
Boyd commenced practice in Salem, New York, but shortly afterward moved to Whitehall, New York. He was elected Justice of the Peace in 1828 and served for many years, and also served as member of the New York State Assembly in 1840. He was Supervisor of Whitehall in 1845, 1848, and 1849.

Elected as a Whig to the Thirty-second Congress Boyd was United States Representative for the fourteenth district of New York from March 4, 1851, to March 3, 1853. He served as special surrogate of Washington County from 1857 to 1859. He was elected president of the village of Whitehall, Washington County, New York. He resumed the practice of law.

== Death ==
Boyd died in Whitehall, Washington County, New York, on July 2, 1868 (age 68 years, 337 days). He is interred at Evergreen Cemetery, Salem, New York.

U.S. House of Representatives
Preceded by George R. Andrews	Member of the U.S. House of Representatives from New York's 14th congressional district March 4, 1851 – March 3, 1853	Succeeded by Rufus W. Peckham
