= William Carleton Watts =

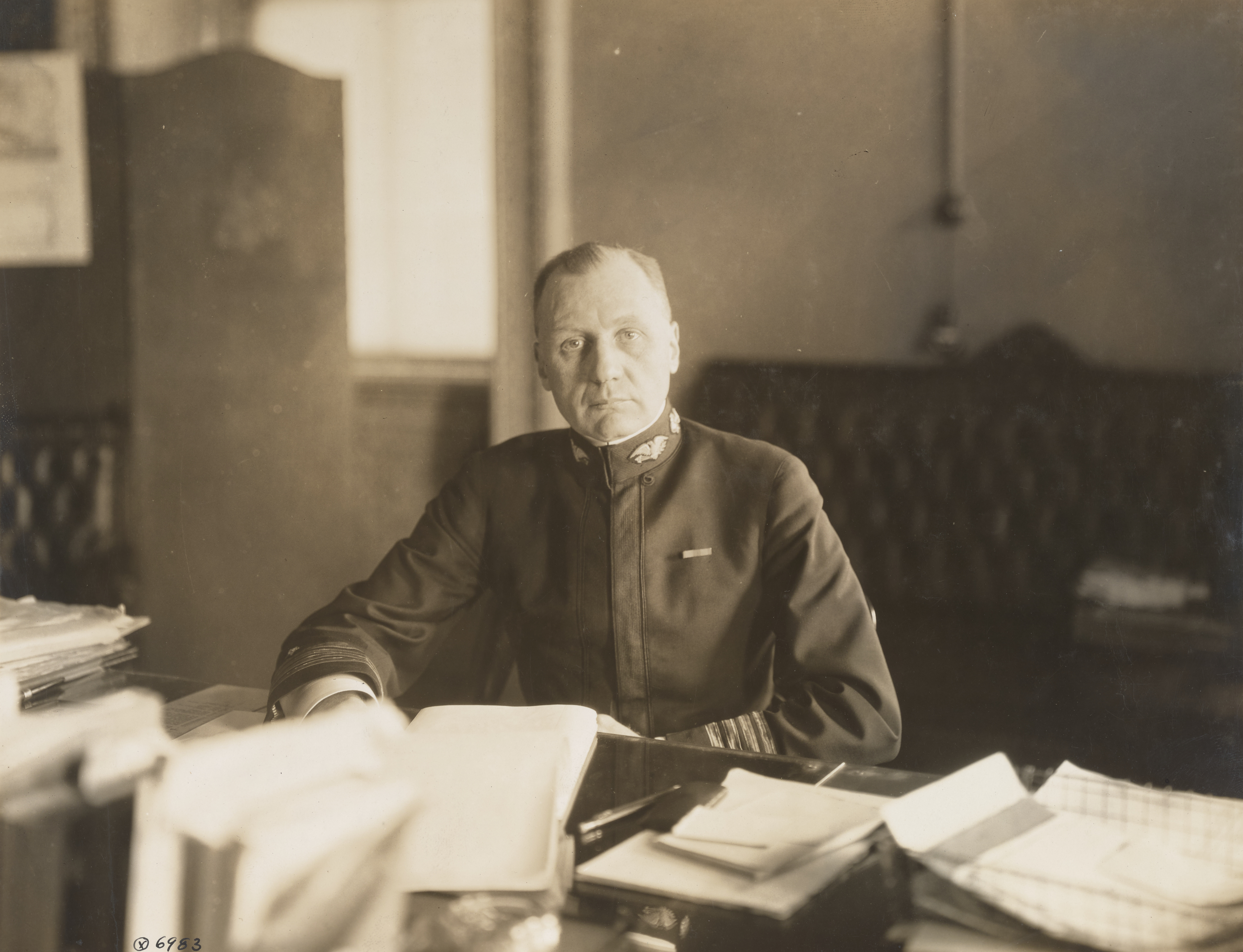
- W.C. Watts, 1918
- Born: February 18, 1880; Philadelphia, Pennsylvania, U.S.
- Died: January 5, 1956 (aged 75); Rosemont, Pennsylvania, U.S.
- Relatives: Ethelbert Watts (father)
- Military career
- Allegiance: United States of America
- Branch: United States Navy
- Service years: 1898–1942
- Rank: Rear Admiral
- Commands: Albany; Raleigh; Colorado
- Conflicts: Spanish–American War; World War I World War II
- Awards: Navy Cross

William Carleton Watts (February 18, 1880 – January 5, 1956) was a rear admiral in the United States Navy, who served in the Spanish–American War, World War I, and World War II.

== Biography ==
=== Early life and career ===
Watts was born in Philadelphia, Pennsylvania, and the youngest son of U.S. diplomat Ethelbert Watts (1846–1919) and his first wife Emily Pepper Watts. He was a direct descendant of Frederick Watts, a brigadier-general in the colonial army during the Revolutionary War. He attended the United States Naval Academy from 1894 to 1898 and graduated at age 18, ranking second in his class.

During the Spanish–American War, which began as his senior year ended, he served on the protected cruiser Columbia. He was promoted to ensign in 1900, and to lieutenant soon thereafter.

=== World War I ===
Watts served as the first navigator of the battleship New York in 1914, and as executive officer of the battleship Michigan in 1916–17. With the rank of captain, Watts served as Judge Advocate General of the Navy from January 6, 1917, to April 15, 1918, and then as the commander of the cruiser Albany. As the flagship of Squadron 6, Patrol Force, Atlantic Fleet, Albany escorted convoys of merchantmen, cargo ships, and troop transports back and forth across the Atlantic. Between July 1917 and the end of the war on 11 November 1918, she shepherded 11 such convoys safely between the United States and Europe. For this service Watts was awarded the Navy Cross, "for distinguished service in the line of his profession as commanding officer of the Albany engaged in the important, exacting and hazardous duty of transporting and escorting troops and supplies to European ports through waters infested with enemy submarines and mines".

=== Interwar period ===
In 1919–20 Watts was the senior U.S. Naval Officer of the International Force stationed in Vladivostok, Siberia, during the Russian Civil War. The United States landed troops at Vladivostok, possibly to check Japanese pretensions in that area, and to secure the port as an exit for the Czech Legion, then transiting the Trans-Siberian Railway. Watts sent armed landing parties ashore on several occasions in support of the troops and to evacuate sick and wounded men. The Americans withdrew in the spring of 1920, and the Albany resumed duty with the Asiatic Fleet.

In 1922 Watts served as Chief of the Gunnery Exercises and Engineering Division, Office of Naval Operations, Department of the Navy, then as commander of the light cruiser Raleigh in 1924, and as U.S. Naval Attaché in London in 1925–27.

Promoted to rear admiral in 1930 he was the Commandant of Portsmouth Naval Shipyard in 1931–32, and in 1931 was appointed to preside over the court martial proceedings against controversial U.S. Marine major general Smedley Butler, who had been accused of circulating false rumors regarding Italian dictator Benito Mussolini. The proceedings were cancelled after an agreed-upon reprimand by the Secretary of the Navy of General Butler, who resigned from the Marine Corps soon thereafter.

Watts then served as the Commander of the Mine Force of the United States Pacific Fleet in 1932–1934, Commandant of Philadelphia Naval Shipyard and commander of the Fourth Naval District in 1934–1937, commander of the battleship Colorado, and commandant of the Great Lakes Naval Training Station and commander of the Ninth Naval District in 1939–1940.

=== World War II ===
Although he had retired from active service on December 1, 1940, after America's entry into World War II Watts was involved in the industrial incentives section of the Navy's office of public relations, speaking at ship launchings, and presenting "E" pennants to defense plants in recognition of outstanding war production. Watts retired again, reluctantly, in 1942 due to poor health.

== Personal life ==
He was married, on April 16, 1902, to Julia Florence Scott. They were the parents of one daughter, Emily Pepper Watts Tracy. He died in Rosemont, Pennsylvania, on January 5, 1956.

== Awards ==
His navy decorations (medals) are as follows:

- Navy Cross (1918)
- Spanish–American War Campaign Medal (1898)
- Mexican Campaign Medal (1917)
- World War I Victory Medal with Escort Bar (1918)
- American Defense Service Medal (1939-1941)
- American Campaign Medal (1941–1942)
- World War II Victory Medal (1945)
- Czechoslovak Military War Medal (1921)
