= John Lathrop (American minister) =

American minister 1740–1816

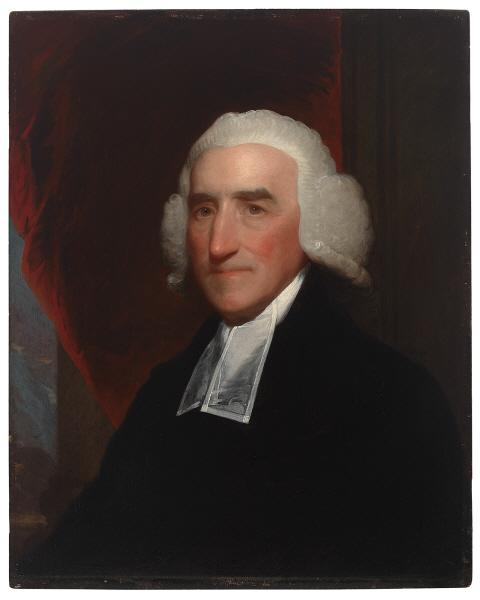
- portrait by Gilbert Stuart
- Born: 1740, 1739
- Died: 1816
- Children: Ann Motley (Lothrop)
- Awards: Fellow of the American Academy of Arts and Sciences (1790–)

John Lathrop (1740-1816) was a congregationalist minister in Boston, Massachusetts, during the revolutionary and early republic periods.

Lathrop was born 1740 and served as minister of the Second Church, Boston, 1768-1816, when it was located in the North End—first on North Square, and after 1779, on Hanover Street. In 1776, during the British occupation of Boston, the Second Church was burnt for firewood by British soldiers. Lathrop was considered a patriot. He was elected a Fellow of the American Academy of Arts and Sciences in 1790, and a member of the American Antiquarian Society in 1813.

Lathrop died in 1816.
