= Leo N. Levi =

American lawyer

Leo Napoleon Levi (September 15, 1856 – January 13, 1904) was a Jewish-American lawyer and Jewish activist from Texas.

== Biography ==
Levi was born on September 15, 1856, in Victoria, Texas, the son of Abraham Levi and Mina Halfin. His father was a merchant from Alsace who settled in Victoria in 1849.

Levi was sent to New York City to take a commercial course, but as he had no interest in a commercial career he returned home in 1871. In 1872, he went to study law at the University of Virginia in Charlottesville, Virginia. While there, he won the debater's medal and the essayist's medal. He finished his studies and returned to Texas when he was twenty, using proceedings to be allowed to be admitted to the bar despite being under twenty-one. In 1878, he stumped the state to support Gustav Schleicher's congressional campaign. He never held public office, but he took an active interest in public affairs. He settled in Galveston, becoming associated with the law firm Flournoy and Scott in 1876. He later became a partner in the firm Scott, Levi, and Smith. A well-known orator, he gave the commencement speech for the University of Texas in June 1899.

One of the only Jewish students at the University of Virginia, Levi experienced anti-Semitism and was picked on by the other students. One of his classmates, writer Thomas Nelson Page, based one of his book's characters, Wolfert, on him. He won the school's admiration and respect by the time he graduated, but his experiences influenced his career and encouraged him to support persecuted Jews. He was elected president of Temple B'nai Israel in 1887, serving in that position for twelve years and bringing Rabbi Henry Cohen to the congregation in 1888.

Levi moved to New York City in 1899 and opened a law office there. In 1887, he wrote an open letter to the American rabbinate called "Tell Us: What Is Judaism?" Unsatisfied with the replies, he answered his question with the pamphlet "Judaism in America." Active in B'nai B'rith, he became its president in 1900. His last public act was connected to a petition to the Russian government drawn up in protest of the Kishinev pogrom in April 1903.

== Personal life ==
In 1877, Levi married Ray Bachrach. They had six surviving children.

Whilst Levi declined to take a political office he was very active in public affairs in both Texas and New York. He moved to New York City in 1899 and opens a law office there.

His main activity was working for his community particularly against anti semitism, as the president of B’Nai Brith he penned a petition to the Russian government in protest at the Kishnev Massacre to ask them to stop abusing Jews. The petition was signed by the Secretary of State John Hay and President Theodore Roosevelt endorsed it. He was one of the first Texas born Jews to receive National Recognition.

== Death ==
Levi died from a jaundice attack at Memorial Hospital on January 13, 1904. Rabbi Maurice H. Harris, Rabbi Joseph Silverman, and B'nai B'rith Executive Committee Vice-President Simon Wolf spoke at his funeral at Temple Emanu-El. The pallbearers included Oscar S. Straus, ex-Justice William N. Cohen, ex-Justice Ernest Hall, Cyrus L. Sulzberger, Dr. Isidore Singer, Julius Goldman, Benjamin Tuska, M. Warley Platzek, Solomon Sulzberger, Simon Wolf, and Julius Bien. The funeral was also attended by, among other people, Jacob H. Schiff, Moritz Ellinger, Judge Myer S. Isaacs, Judge Samson Lachman, Jacob A. Cantor, Rabbi Rudolph Grossman, Samuel B. Hamburger, Nathan Straus, Congressman Henry M. Goldfogle, Rabbi Isaac S. Moses, and Ferdinand Levy. Henry M. Leipziger. He was buried in Salem Fields Cemetery.

== Legacy ==
The Leo N. Levi Hospital in Hot Springs, Arkansas, which was established in 1914, was named after him. the hospital is being demolished as of 2026
