= Fedida =

Fedida is a surname. Notable people with the surname include:

- Barbara Fedida (born 1967/1968), American media executive
- Samuel Fedida (1918–2007), Egyptian-born British telecommunication engineer
