= Isaac S. Moses =

Jewish-American rabbi (1847–1926)

Isaac S. Moses (December 8, 1847 – December 2, 1926) was a German-born Jewish-American rabbi.

== Life ==
Moses was born on December 8, 1847, in Santomischel, Posen, the son of Rabbi Israel Baruch Moses and brother of Rabbi Adolph S. Moses.

Moses was educated at Santomischel, Gleiwitz, and Breslau. He received rabbinical diplomas from Rabbi Salomon Rosenthal of Jaroczyn and Rabbi Bernhard Felsenthal of Chicago. He moved to America in the early 1870s and initially worked as a religious teacher in St. Louis, Missouri. In 1874, he was elected rabbi of the B'nai Sholom Temple in Quincy, Illinois. In 1879, he was elected rabbi of the Emanuel Congregation in Milwaukee, Wisconsin. In 1887, he was elected rabbi of the Temple Congregation in Nashville, Tennessee. In 1888, he was elected rabbi of Kehilath Anshe Ma'arav in Chicago, Illinois. In 1896, he organized a new synagogue on the South Side called Temple Israel. In 1901, he was made rabbi of Central Synagogue in New York City, New York. He became rabbi emeritus of the Synagogue in the end of 1917, not long after his 70th birthday.

Moses wrote The Pentateuch in 1881, The Historical Books of the Bible in 1884, The Ethics of the Hebrew Scriptures 1889, and Hymns for Jewish Worship in 1904. He also edited Tefillah le-Mosheh in 1886. He published and edited the German weekly Zetgeist in Milwaukee with his brother Adolph and Emil G. Hirsch from 1880 to 1882. A charter and active member of the Central Conference of American Rabbis, his manuscript became the basis of the Union Prayer Book in 1894. The Conference also published Sermons by American Rabbis, which he collected and edited, that same year. Active before the outlines of Reform Judaism were firmly established, he initially leaned towards Rabbi David Einhorn's radicalism before switching to the conservatism of Rabbi Isaac Mayer Wise. He published a number of sermons and textbooks for children, and his 1894 Sabbath School Hymnal had fourteen additions.

Moses died from heart disease at his home at the Manhattan Square Hotel on December 2, 1926. His funeral was held at the Central Synagogue, where Rabbi Jonah Wise conducted the service and Rabbi Stephen S. Wise of the Free Synagogue and Rabbi Nathan Krass of Temple Emanu-El delivered eulogies. The honorary pallbearers included Samuel B. Hamburger, Max Schallek, Joseph Steiner, Max Neuberger, Max Schwarz, August Lambert, Henry Weiss, George Kohut, D. Emil Klein, Gaza Paskus, and Cantor Isadore Weinstock. The funeral was also attended by, among other people, Rabbi Isaac Landman of the Far Rockaway Synagogue, Henry Kantrowitz, Rebekah Bettelheim Kohut, William Loebel, the Rev. Dr. Barnett Ellsworth, Charles E. Block, and Mr. and Mrs. Sigmund Schanzer. He was buried in the Linden Hill Cemetery in Brooklyn.
