= Hübsch =

Hübsch or Huebsch is a German surname. Notable people with the surname include:

- Adolph Huebsch (1830–1884), Hungarian-American Hebrew scholar and rabbi
- Anton Hübsch (1918–1973), German Luftwaffe pilot
- B. W. Huebsch (1876–1964), American publisher
- Carl Ludwig Hübsch (born 1966), German musician
- Edward Huebsch (1904–1982), American screenwriter
- Eric Hübsch (born 1990), German motorcycle racer
- Hadayatullah Hübsch (1946–2011), German writer, journalist and activist
- Heinrich Hübsch (1795–1863), German architect
- Michael Huebsch (born 1964), American politician

== See also ==
- Huebsch, a brand used by Alliance Laundry Systems
