= Angela Buchdahl =

American rabbi (born 1972)

Rabbi Angela Warnick Buchdahl
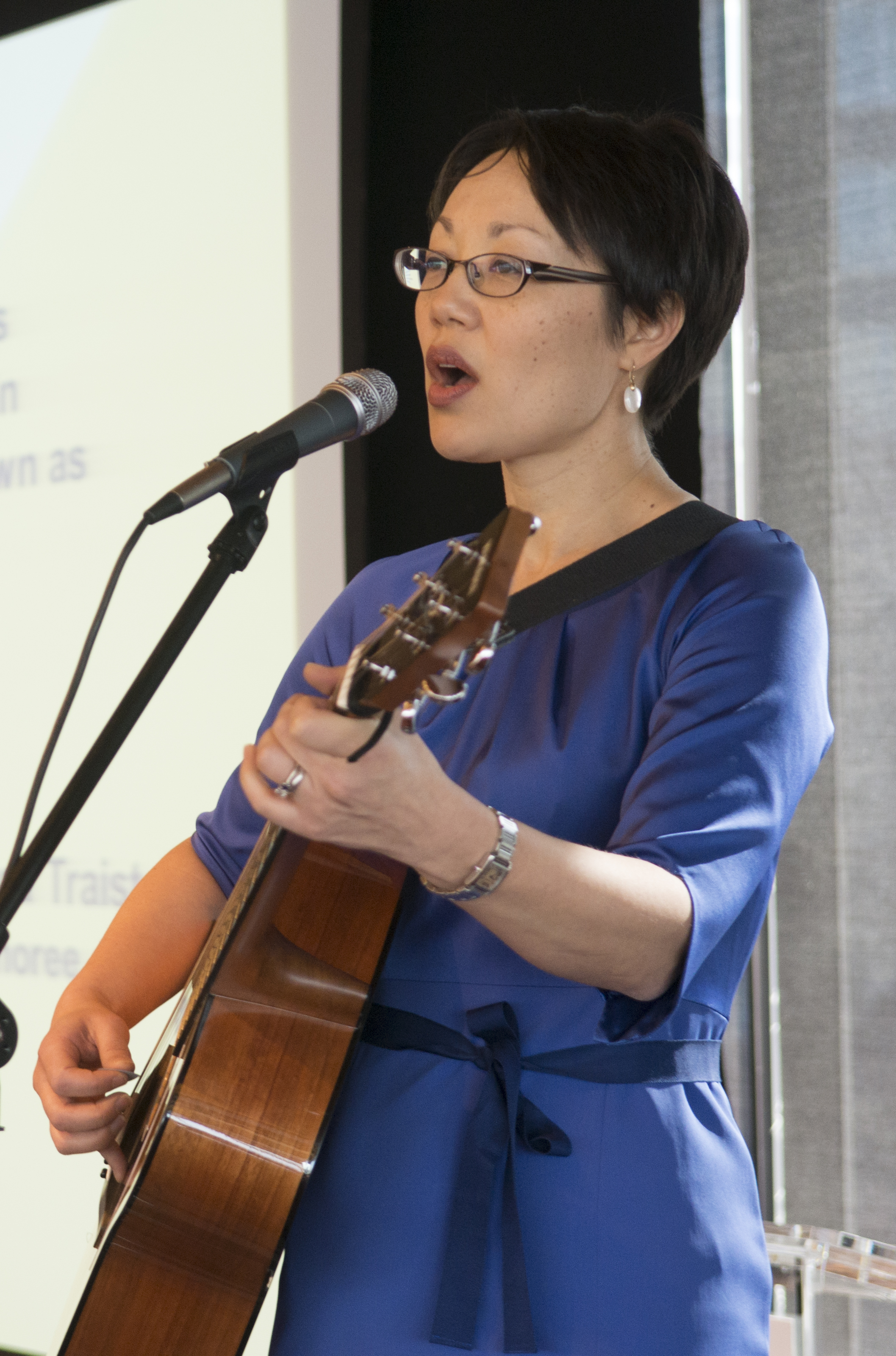
- Buchdahl sings and plays guitar at the Jewish Women's Archive in 2013
- Born: Angela Lee Warnick; July 8, 1972 (age 54); Seoul, South Korea
- Education: Yale University (BA in Religious Studies, 1994); Hebrew Union College-Jewish Institute of Religion (HUC-JIR) in New York (ordained cantor 1999, ordained rabbi 2001)
- Known for: Reform Rabbi, cantor
- Spouse: Jacob Buchdahl
- Children: 3

Angela Buchdahl (née Warnick; Korean: 앤절라 워닉 북달; born July 8, 1972) is an American reform rabbi. She was the second East Asian-American to be ordained as a rabbi, and the first East Asian-American to be ordained as a hazzan (cantor). In 2011 she was named by Newsweek and The Daily Beast as one of America's "Most Influential Rabbis", and in 2012 by The Daily Beast as one of America's "Top 50 Rabbis". Buchdahl was recognized as one of the top five in The Forward's 2014 "Forward Fifty", a list of American Jews who had the most impact on the national scene in the previous year.

== Early life ==
Buchdahl was born in Seoul, South Korea, to a Korean Buddhist mother, Sulja Yi Warnick, and Frederick David Warnick, an American Ashkenazi Reform Jew, whose ancestors emigrated from Bacău County, Romania, and Russia to the United States.

At the age of five, Buchdahl moved to the United States with her family. She was raised Jewish, attending Temple Beth El in Tacoma, Washington, which her great-grandparents had assisted in founding a century before. Like her mother, she became very involved in temple activities, and became a leader in school and within the youth group. She attended Stadium High School in Tacoma. At the age of 16, she visited Israel through Bronfman youth fellowships with other Jewish teenagers from the U.S., and for the first time had the authenticity of her Judaism questioned by an Orthodox Jew based on the belief that only children of a Jewish mother can be Jewish. As a college student, she spent her summers working as head song leader at Camp Swig, a Reform Jewish camp in Saratoga, California. At the age of 21 she underwent a Reform conversion or giyur, which she views as a "reaffirmation ceremony".

Buchdahl attended Yale University, where she was one of the first female members of Skull and Bones, a secret student society. During her time at Yale, she met her husband Jacob Buchdahl, now an attorney. She earned a Bachelor of Arts degree in Religious Studies from Yale University in 1994 and began her cantorial and rabbinic studies at Hebrew Union College.

== Career ==
=== Early years ===
In 1999, Buchdahl was invested as a cantor, and in 2001, she was ordained as a rabbi by Hebrew Union College-Jewish Institute of Religion, a seminary for Reform Judaism. She was the first East Asian-American to be ordained as a rabbi, and the first Asian-American to be ordained as a hazzan (cantor) anywhere in the world. She became assistant rabbi and cantor at Westchester Reform Temple, which in 2003 had membership of over 1,200 families.

Buchdahl joined Central Synagogue, a large Reform congregation in Manhattan, as senior cantor in 2006. During her tenure as of 2012, Friday night attendance at the synagogue had doubled, post-bar mitzvah retention had tripled, and the waiting list for membership had risen to over 300.

=== Senior Rabbi at Central Synagogue ===
In 2013, Buchdahl was named the Senior Rabbi of the Central Synagogue. She is the first woman and the first Asian-American to be their Senior Rabbi. On July 1, 2014, Buchdahl succeeded Peter Rubinstein as Senior Rabbi at Central Synagogue. She is the first woman and first East Asian-American to hold the post in the Synagogue's long history, and one of only a few women serving as leaders of a major U.S. synagogue. Central Synagogue has membership of over 7,000, over $30 million in endowment, and approximately 100 full-time employees.

In December 2014, she was welcomed by President Barack Obama to lead the prayers at the White House Hanukkah celebration. At the podium, Buchdahl commented on how special the scene was, asking the President if he believed America's founding fathers could possibly have pictured that a female Asian-American rabbi would one day be at the White House leading Jewish prayers in front of the African-American president. Her speech on the meaning of Hannukah and religious freedom met with applause and cheers. Writer Abigail Pogrebin, who also served as President of Central Synagogue (where Buchdahl is Senior Rabbi), noted that as Buchdahl "stood alongside the African-American president and led us in the Hebrew blessing over the candles, there was a moving magnificence both in that unlikely tableau and in the sound of a Jewish prayer filling The People's house".

On March 22, 2019, Buchdahl opened the doors of Central Synagogue to hundreds of worshipers from a nearby mosque ravaged by fire.

In December 2019, the Jewish Telegraphic Agency named her among the Jews who defined the 2010s, and stated, "The choice of Buchdahl to replace the retiring Rabbi Peter Rubinstein elevated a woman and a Jew of color to a position of virtually unprecedented prominence in the Jewish world and made Buchdahl a potent symbol of the changing face of American Judaism."

On January 15, 2022, Buchdahl was called by and spoke with the hostage-taker in the Colleyville synagogue hostage crisis at the Congregation Beth Israel synagogue in Colleyville, Texas. The hostage taker said that he had a bomb, and asked Buchdahl to use her position of influence to secure Aafia Siddiqui's release from prison. After the call, Buchdahl immediately contacted law enforcement.

Buchdahl conducts interfaith weddings at Central Synagogue for couples who say they "are committed to creating a Jewish household". She appears in the PBS documentary 18 Voices Sing Kol Nidre.

=== Other activities ===
Buchdahl has served as faculty for the Wexner Heritage Foundation and for the Union for Reform Judaism (URJ) Kallot programs, and on the boards of Auburn Theological Seminary, Avodah Jewish Service Corps, UJA Federation, and the Jewish Multiracial Network.

=== Reputation and honors ===
Buchdahl is one of the best-known rabbis in the United States. The Jewish Telegraphic Agency credits her national stature on "her ability to articulate Jewish concerns in a way that embraces and respects those who might disagree with her."

In 2011, Buchdahl was named by Newsweek and The Daily Beast as one of America's "Most Influential Rabbis", and in 2012 by The Daily Beast as one of America's "Top 50 Rabbis". Buchdahl was recognized as one of the top five in The Forward's 2014 "Forward Fifty", a list of American Jews who had the most impact on the national scene in the previous year. The 2022 art exhibit “Holy Sparks”, shown among other places at the Dr. Bernard Heller Museum, featured art about twenty-four female rabbis who were firsts in some way; Laurie Gross created the artwork about Buchdahl that was in that exhibit.

== Views ==
A sermon given by Buchdahl about the Gaza war received over 120,000 views.

After significant pushback from various communities, she criticized Zohran Mamdani for what she calls "false claims of genocide" regarding Israel's actions and asserted anti-Zionist rhetoric constitutes antisemitism.

== See also ==
- Timeline of women rabbis
