= Howard Michaels =

American businessman

- Born: November 3, 1955
- Died: September 21, 2018 (aged 62)
- Education: American University (BA)
- Known for: Founder of the Carlton Group
- Spouse: Jennifer Bayer (after 2004)
- Children: 5
- Website: https://www.carltongroup.com

Howard Lee Michaels (November 3, 1955 – September 21, 2018) was an American businessman who was the founder of the real estate investment advisory firm Carlton Group.

== Biography ==
Michaels was born to a Jewish family in Flatbush, Brooklyn in 1955 but was raised in Deer Park, New York. His father worked in a retail carpet store where Michaels also occasionally worked. In 1977, he graduated from American University in Washington, D.C. After school, he accepted a job with 3M selling copy machines and then accepted a position with Connecticut General Life Insurance Company (now CIGNA) before moving on to the Manhattan-based real estate syndicator Island Planning. Island Planning pooled together funds from multiple investors to fund real estate transactions.

Michaels levered his success and became a partner at the Long Island-based Carlton Brokerage and then in the early 1990s, he created a new company called Carlton Property Auctions which auctioned the plethora of distressed real estate from the early 1990s real estate bust. In the mid-1990s, he ventured out on his own and formed the Carlton Group in Manhattan (also retaining his interest in the Carlton Brokerage). At the time, securitization transactions were replacing syndications and the Carlton Group ventured into this new product. His significant transactions included the 2007 financing of the $350 million Trump Soho; the 2005 financing of the $825 million equity and condo conversion financing of Manhattan House; and the 2004, $1.7 billion recapitalization of the GM Building.

The Carlton Group focuses on raising money from high-net-worth individuals and institutions to provide 80 to 100 percent of the capital required for a real estate project. Based in New York City, the Carlton Group also has operations in Chicago, Los Angeles, Florida, Athens, and London. Seeing that securitizations were a commodity product, Michaels returned to what he did best: bringing high-net-worth investors and real estate developers together. Carlton had a reputation for getting the hard deals done and focuses on working with individual developers rather than institutions.

== Personal life ==
Michaels was married twice. In 2004, he married his second wife, Jennifer Tara Bayer in a Jewish ceremony at the Pierre Hotel. He has five children, Alexandra, Reese, David, Josh and Sam. His wife worked as Senator Chuck Schumer's chief fundraiser and as a senior fundraiser for the Democratic Senatorial Campaign Committee. Despite his wife's affiliation, Michaels was a Republican. He served as a mentor to the Young Jewish Professionals Real Estate Network. Michaels died of gastric cancer on September 21, 2018; services were held at the Central Synagogue in Manhattan.
