= Adolph Huebsch =

American rabbi (1830–1884)

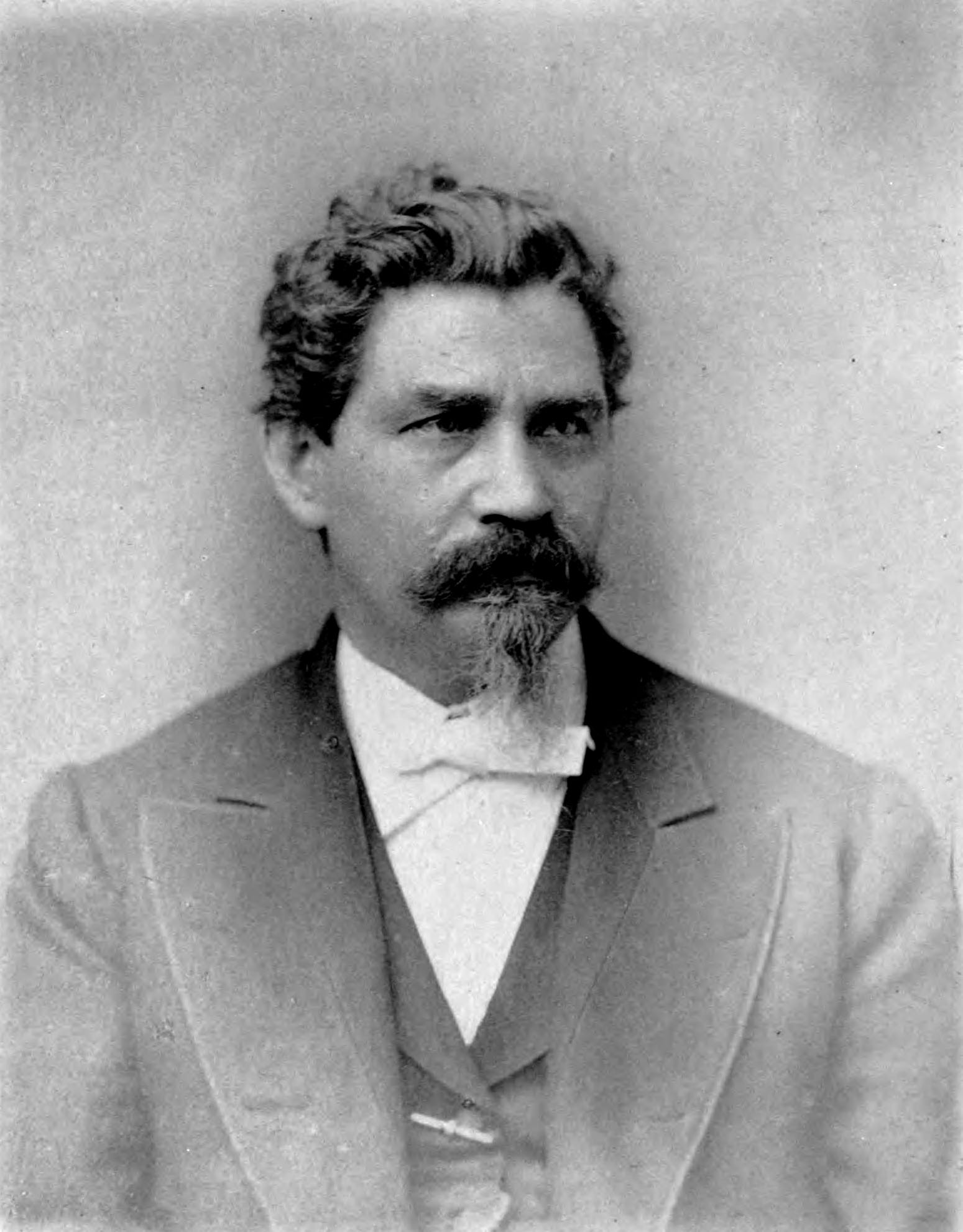

Signature
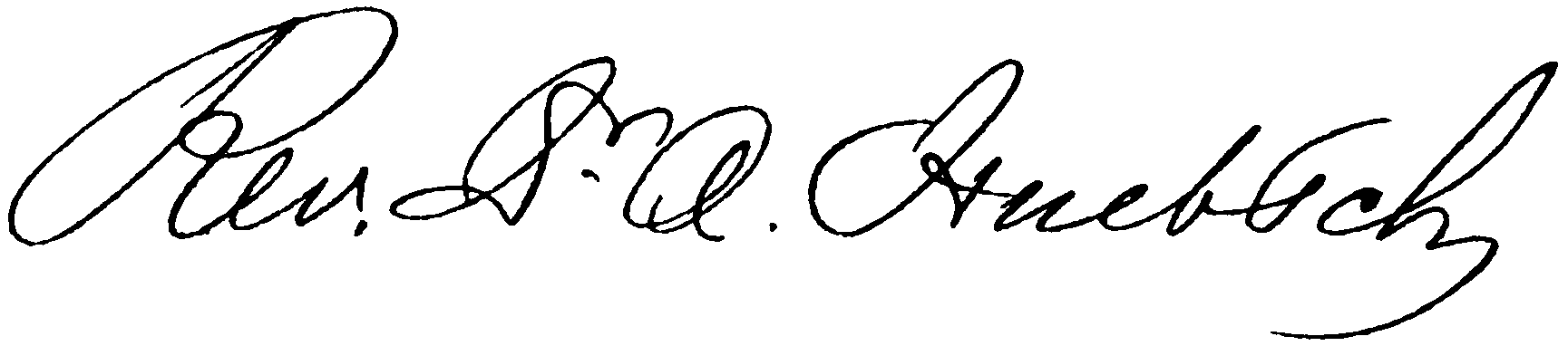

Adolph Huebsch (born in Szentmiklós, Hungary [now Liptovsky Mikulas, Slovakia], 18 September 1830; died in New York City, 10 October 1884) was a Hungarian-American Hebrew scholar and rabbi.

== Biography ==
While a student, he participated in the Hungarian Revolution of 1848/9. After it was suppressed, he resumed his studies and officiated as rabbi in various towns. In 1861, he received the degree of Ph.D. from Prague University, and preached in that city for a short time.

In 1866 he was called to New York City as rabbi of Central Synagogue, where he preached until his death.> Huebsch was a Talmudic and Semitic scholar of high attainments, a preacher of rare power, with a personality that charmed old and young. He was peculiarly successful in his ministry.

He published Gems from the Orient, a selection of Talmudic and oriental proverbs, and a volume of his sermons and addresses was issued in 1885.
