= Ernest Hall (judge) =

American judge

Ernest Hall (October 24, 1844 – June 13, 1920) was an English-born American lawyer and judge from New York.

== Life ==
Hall was born on October 24, 1844, in London, England, the son of Henry Bryan Hall and Mary Ann Denison. His father was a well-known steel engraver. The Hall family immigrated to America in 1850.

Hall lived in Morrisania. He attended public school from 1851 to 1858, when he graduated. He then worked in the publishing house Putnams until 1860. In the fall of that year, he began studying law in the office of Henry Spratley of Morrisania. He studied there until 1861, when he began studying in the office of Carpentier & Beach in New York City. He stayed in the latter office until May 1864. In 1863, in the middle of the American Civil War, he joined the 71st New York Infantry Regiment during the Gettysburg campaign and returned home at the end of the New York City draft riots. He then resumed his law studies until August 1864, when he joined the Union Navy as a landsman and was detailed as clerk on board the receiving ship in the Brooklyn Navy Yard. He then joined the steamer Mohican, which was commanded by future rear admiral Daniel Ammen, was attached to the North Atlantic Squadron, and served on the ship as clerk to the Mohican's executive officer. He served in both Battles of Fort Fisher in North Carolina in December 1864 and January 1865, spent the winter on the Ogeechee River in Georgia, and assisted in dismantling Fort McAllister after it was captured by General Sherman's army. He returned North in March 1865, and he was discharged in May 1865. Three of his brothers also fought in the Civil War.

Hall attended the New York University School of Law, graduating from there in 1866. He was admitted to the bar later that year and began practicing law in Morrisania. The town was annexed into New York City in 1874. He served as Justice of the New York City Court for six years, beginning in 1882. In 1895, he unsuccessfully ran for the New York Supreme Court on the Republican and Reform ticket. He served on the Morrisania Board of Trustees from 1869 to 1873, and in the latter year he was appointed Morrisania corporation counsel. When Morrisania was annexed into New York City, New York City Corporation Counsel E. Delafield Smith appointed him to attend to all pending cases in the newly annexed district. Smith's successor, William C. Whitney, retained Hall in the position. Hall also served as counsel to the Board of Excise, the German Savings Bank, and the Morrisania Fire Department.

In 1898, Hall became referee in bankruptcy for the Southern District of New York. In 1902, Governor Odell appointed him to the New York Supreme Court to fill the unexpired term of Justice Beach. By the time he died, he was one of the oldest practicing lawyers in New York City. He was a presidential elector in the 1904 presidential election.

Hall became a member of the Grand Army of the Republic in 1871, became a charter member of a Post in 1880, and served as the Post's Senior Vice-Commander in 1881. He was president of the Alumni of University Law School and a member of the New York Athletic Club. In 1869, he married Charita M. Talient. Their children were Charita, Alma, and Edna.

Hall died at home from pneumonia on June 13, 1920. He was buried in Woodlawn Cemetery.
