= Lipník (Mladá Boleslav District) =

- Municipality
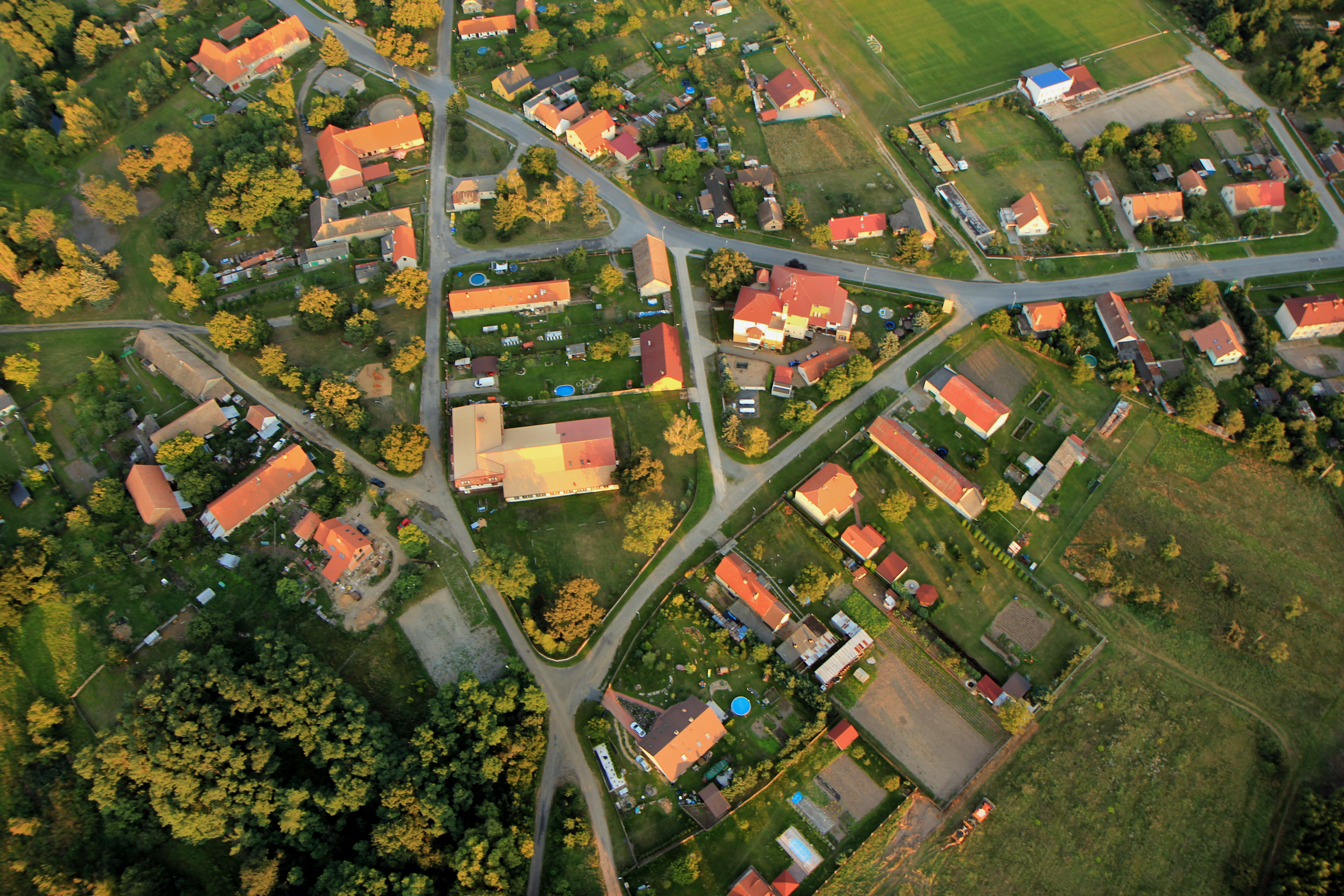
- Middle part of Lipník

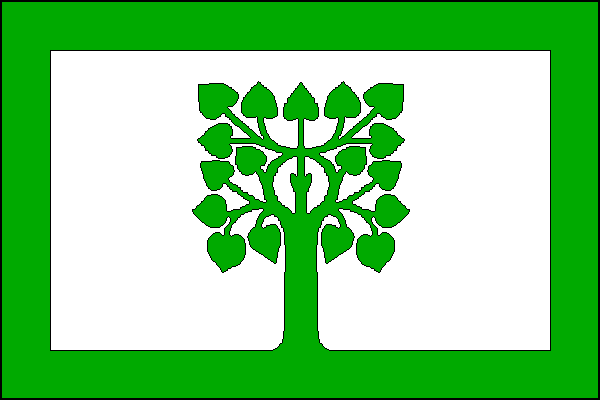
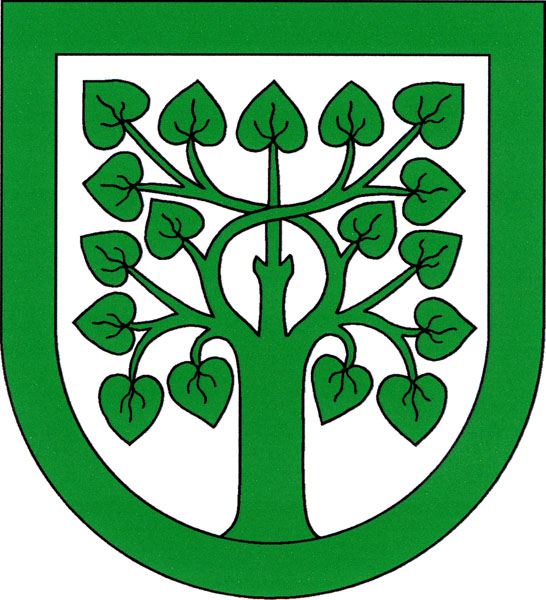
- Flag Coat of arms

- Location in the Czech Republic
- Coordinates: 50°16′21″N 14°54′45″E
- Country: Czech Republic
- Region: Central Bohemian
- District: Mladá Boleslav
- First mentioned: 1338

Area
  - Total: 9.34 km^{2} (3.61 sq mi)
- Elevation: 258 m (846 ft)

Population (2026-01-01)
  - Total: 416
  - Density: 44.5/km^{2} (115/sq mi)
- Time zone: UTC+1 (CET)
  - Summer (DST): UTC+2 (CEST)
- Postal code: 294 43
- Website: www.obec-lipnik.cz

Lipník is a municipality and village in Mladá Boleslav District in the Central Bohemian Region of the Czech Republic. It has about 400 inhabitants.

== Demographics ==
Historical population
Year	Pop.	±%
1869	570	—
1880	666	+16.8%
1890	731	+9.8%
1900	705	−3.6%
1910	801	+13.6%
1921	830	+3.6%
1930	809	−2.5%
1950	235	−71.0%
1961	325	+38.3%
1970	300	−7.7%
1980	248	−17.3%
1991	220	−11.3%
2001	227	+3.2%
2011	308	+35.7%
2021	346	+12.3%
Source: Censuses
