= Jonah Wise =

American rabbi (1881–1959)

Rabbi Jonah Bondi Wise
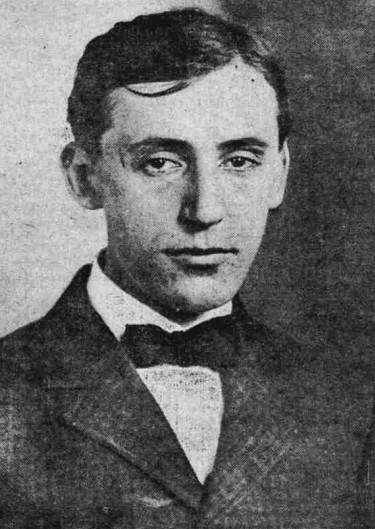
- Wise c. 1906

Personal life
- Born: February 21, 1881
- Died: February 1, 1959 (aged 77) New York City, US
- Spouse: Helen Rosenfeld
- Parent: Isaac Mayer Wise
- Notable work: Founder of the United Jewish Appeal
- Education: Hebrew Union College, University of Cincinnati
- Occupation: Rabbi

Religious life
- Religion: Judaism
- Denomination: Reform

Rabbi Jonah Bondi Wise (February 21, 1881 – February 1, 1959) was an American rabbi and leader of the Reform Judaism movement, who served for over thirty years as rabbi of the Central Synagogue in Manhattan and was a founder of the United Jewish Appeal, serving as its chairman from its creation in 1939 until 1958.

== Biography ==
Jonah Wise was born on February 21, 1881, the son of Rabbi Isaac Mayer Wise the founder of Reform Judaism in the United States. He graduated from Hebrew Union College (which had been founded by his father in 1875) and the University of Cincinnati in 1903. He continued his studies at the University of Berlin and the University of Bern.

Wise was rabbi of the Mizpah Temple in Chattanooga, Tennessee, from 1904 to 1906, and served as rabbi of Temple Beth Israel in Portland, Oregon, starting in 1910. Rabbi Wise was chosen to lead the Central Synagogue in Manhattan, the oldest Reform congregation in continuous use in New York City and whose cornerstone had been laid by his father in 1870.

Rabbi Wise had been selected in 1931 to head the American Jewish Joint Distribution Committee, working to restructure the organization's finances in the face of efforts to liquidate the philanthropy which had suffered financially during the Great Depression.

Wise was described as "a pioneer in Jewish religious broadcasting" by The New York Times, beginning his "Message of Israel" Sunday morning radio broadcast in 1934, which continued until two weeks before his death.

After Adolf Hitler came to power, Wise traveled to Germany, where he created a program to provide temporary relief to the Jewish community there and arranged for financial assistance to those who had fled the country. He was chosen by President Franklin D. Roosevelt in 1938 to serve as a delegate to the Évian Conference, where representatives of 32 countries met at Évian-les-Bains, France, to discuss the problem of Jewish refugees.

In January 1939, Rabbi Wise and the American Jewish Joint Distribution Committee joined with Rabbi Abba Hillel Silver of the United Palestine Appeal and William Rosenwald of the National Coordinating Committee Fund, to form the United Jewish Appeal for Refugees and Overseas Needs. The founders emphasized that the funds needed to support Jews in Europe and Palestine would be triple to quadruple the amount raised in the previous year. While the organizations would raise funds together, the Joint Distribution Committee would assist Jews in Europe, the United Palestine Appeal would aid the Jewish community in Palestine, including refugees from Europe arriving there, and the National Coordinating Committee Fund would assist refugees arriving in the United States.

At a 1954 ceremony honoring his fiftieth year as a rabbi, Wise received a proclamation from the Hebrew Union College that described him as "one of the most contributive and distinguished leaders of American Judaism of this generation". Rabbi Solomon Freehof of Pittsburgh, one of 40 religious leaders from the Jewish community and clergyman of other faiths attending the event, recognized Rabbi Wise as "a grand exemplar of 'The American Rabbi'". In his remarks, Rabbi Wise spoke of the American Reform pulpit as "one of the great achievements of the American scene and in the world scene", with a free pulpit that is "unhampered and untrammeled by the inertia of dogma."

== Personal ==
He married the former Helen Rosenfeld of Portland, Oregon, on June 23, 1909. She died in 1950.

Rabbi Wise died at age 77 on February 1, 1959, at Doctors Hospital in Manhattan, after being ill for a week.
