= Samuel B. Hamburger =

American lawyer (1852–1926)

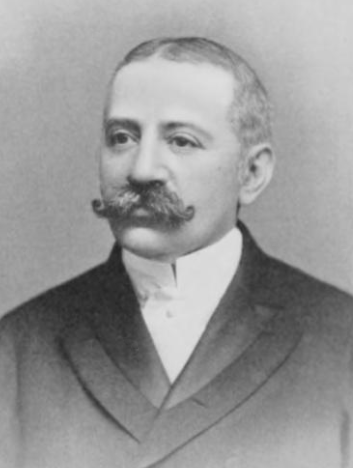
- Born: Samuel Bernard Hamburger; January 21, 1852; Albany, New York, US
- Died: December 28, 1926 (aged 74); New York, New York, US
- Education: Columbia Law School
- Occupation: Lawyer
- Political party: Republican

Samuel Bernard Hamburger (January 21, 1852 – December 28, 1926) was an American lawyer from New York.

== Life ==
Hamburger was born on January 21, 1852, in Albany, New York, the son of Bernhard Hamburger and Ricka Strauss.

Hamburger attended the Scientific Academy in New Haven, Connecticut and graduated from Columbia Law School in 1872 with an LL.B. He studied law at different points with Robert S. Hale of Elizabethtown, New York, Churchill & Woodbury, Solomon F. Higgins, and Treman & Tyler. He was admitted to the New York bar in 1873 and began practicing law in New York City. A Republican, he was a member of the Republican County Committee and a delegate to the state conventions. His clients a number of members of the theatrical profession.

Hamburger was acting president of the Jewish Prisoners' Aid Society, chairman of the Executive Committee of the Jewish Protectory and Aid Society, a director of the Educational Alliance, an executive committee member of the New York branch of the Jewish Theological Seminary of America, principal of the Congregation Ahawath Chesed Shaar Hashomayim Religious School, a trustee of the Washington Cemetery, and general counsel of the Independent Order Free Sons of Israel. In 1904, Mayor George B. McClellan Jr. appointed him a member of the New York City Board of Parole. He served on the Board for nine years. He was also one of the original directors of the Y.M.H.A., a director of the Hebrew Free School, and an organizer and incorporator of the Jewish Protectory.

Hamburger was a member of the National Museum of Art, the Geographical Society, the Manuscript Society of New York, The Lambs, the Independent Order B'nai B'rith, the Federation of Jewish Philanthropic Societies of New York City, the University Settlement, the Actors Fund of America, and the Jewish Publication Society.

Hamburger died of apoplexy in his apartment at the Hotel Buckingham on December 28, 1926.
