= Barbara Fedida =

- Born: 1967 or 1968 (age 58–59); Queens County, New York, United States
- Education: New York University (BA 1988)
- Occupation: Media executive
- Years active: 1988–present
- Spouse: Andrew Brill
- Children: 3

Barbara Fedida (born 1967/1968) is an American television executive who worked at ABC News.

During her career, Fedida has been recognized with Emmy, duPont, Murrow, Peabody, and Telly awards. At ABC, Fedida oversaw the network's diversity and inclusion efforts, and was responsible for hiring and developing all anchors and correspondents for ABC News programs and bureaus worldwide

Previously, Fedida worked for five years as the head of talent development at CBS News from 2006 to 2011.

On July 20, 2020, ABC cut ties with Fedida for allegedly making racially insensitive comments in the workplace.

== Early life ==
Fedida was born in Queens, New York where she lived until her family moved to Merrick, New York in 1972. She is the daughter of Moroccan Jewish parents Abner and Renee (née Elfassy) Fedida from Casablanca, Morocco. Fedida's parents and five siblings immigrated to America from Morocco in 1959. Fedida graduated from John F. Kennedy High School in Bellmore, New York.

Fedida attended New York University (NYU), where she was a Student senator for two years and student commencement speaker. While at NYU, she interned for the Alan Colmes Show on WNBC and at Late Night with David Letterman.

== Career ==
Fedida started at ABC as a production secretary for Peter Jennings documentary unit Peter Jennings Reporting in August 1989, after working at CBS News magazine West 57th.

During her time at ABC, she worked on DayOne, where she was nominated for an Emmy Award for a story about Tara Schaeffer, the first Sesame Street cast member with disabilities. She also was a senior producer on the "Networks Millennium" special, which aired for 23 hours and won a Peabody Award and an Emmy Award.

Fedida worked on World News Tonight with Jennings and produced many of his children's specials, including a special about the September 11 attacks. The 9/11 special won many awards, including a duPont and an Emmy. She was also a producer on Peter Jennings: Reporter, the tribute to Jennings produced by his producers upon his death in August 2005.

Fedida left ABC to join CBS News in 2006. There she won a duPont for her work on Children of the Recession. She returned to ABC in March 2011.

Fedida is credited with changing the face of ABC News, with an aggressive hiring strategy focused on women and people of color. She hired Michael Strahan, Byron Pitts, Cecilia Vega, Tom Llamas, Marcus Moore, Alex Perez, Victor Oquendo, Dr. Jennifer Ashton, Sara Haines, Rebecca Jarvis, Amy Robach, among many others. She also started the ABC News Fellows program.

Fedida oversaw the remake of The View after Barbara Walters' retirement and was part of the team that made the show among the most watched daytime talkers during the 2020 election cycle. The show was called "the most important political TV show in America" by The New York Times Magazine in May 2019.

While at ABC News, the news division won the Edward R. Murrow award for overall excellence three consecutive times.

In June 2020, the Huffington Post cited 34 anonymous sources in reporting that Fedida had made racially insensitive comments, including several targeting Mara Schiavocampo, Robin Roberts, and Kendis Gibson, and frequently used inappropriate, unprofessional language in front of her peers. It was further alleged that Fedida was combative against diversity efforts and minority hiring. The report further noted that she frequently engaged in responsibilities outside of her role's description at the behest of Ben Sherwood and James Goldston, currying favor amongst ABC News leadership.

One month later, Disney had announced that it had cut ties with Fedida, citing confirmation of several of the allegations by a third-party investigator they had hired. The organization simultaneously announced that business affairs would be separated from talent relations and recruitment, dividing the responsibilities of her previous position at ABC News.

== Personal life ==
Fedida married Andrew Brill in a Jewish ceremony in June 1992. They have three children. Fedida sits on the board of trustees of Central Synagogue.
