= Daniel R. Huntington =

American architect

Daniel Riggs Huntington (December 24, 1871 – May 13, 1962) was an American architect who is best known for his work in Seattle, Washington.

== Life ==
Born in 1871 in Newark, New Jersey, Huntington attended Columbia Grammar School and Columbia University. He began working in architecture in 1889 in Denver, Colorado, and worked there and in New York City until moving to Seattle in 1904 or 1905.

He worked as City Architect for the city of Seattle during 1912–1921, designing the Lake Union Steam Plant and at least ten fire stations and libraries, at times solo as Daniel R. Huntington, and in various partnerships: with James Hansen Schack Sr. as Schack and Huntington (established by 1907) and later as Huntington and Gould, as Huntington and Loveless and as Huntington and Torbitt.

He worked in architecture until at least 1946, as he worked for Washington State University as an architect during 1944–46. He died in 1962.

== Works ==
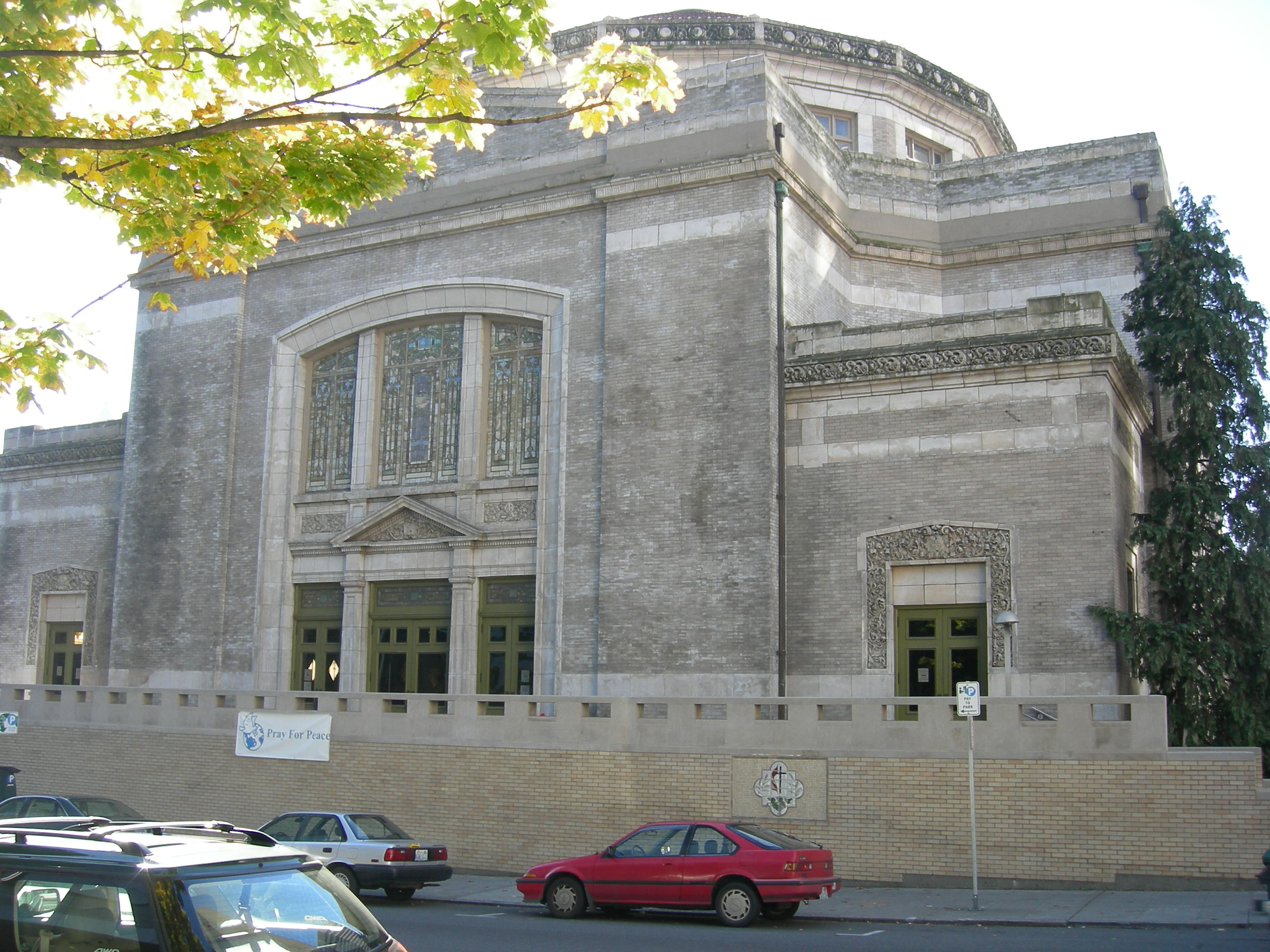
First Methodist Episcopal Church, Seattle

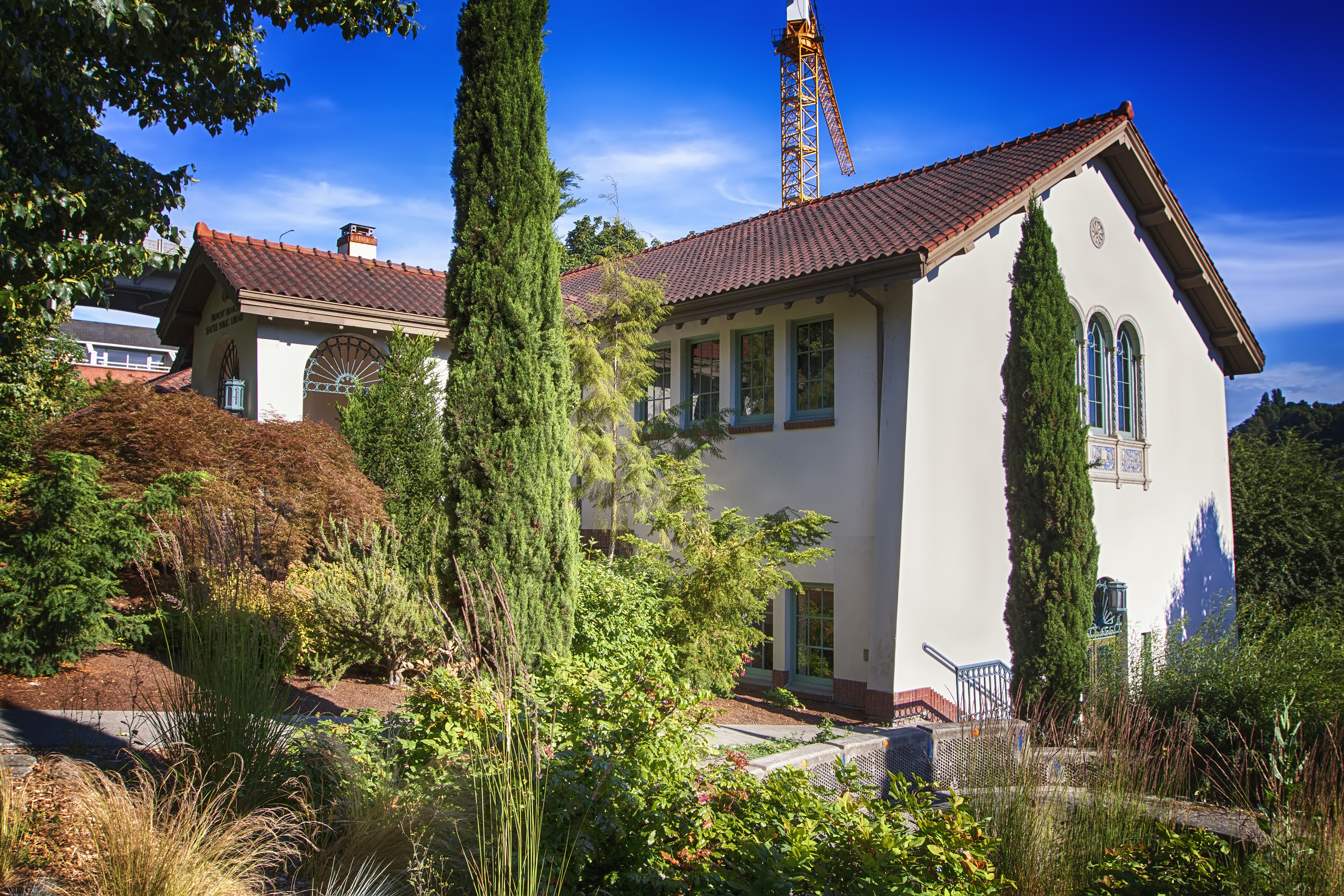
Seattle Public Library Fremont Branch

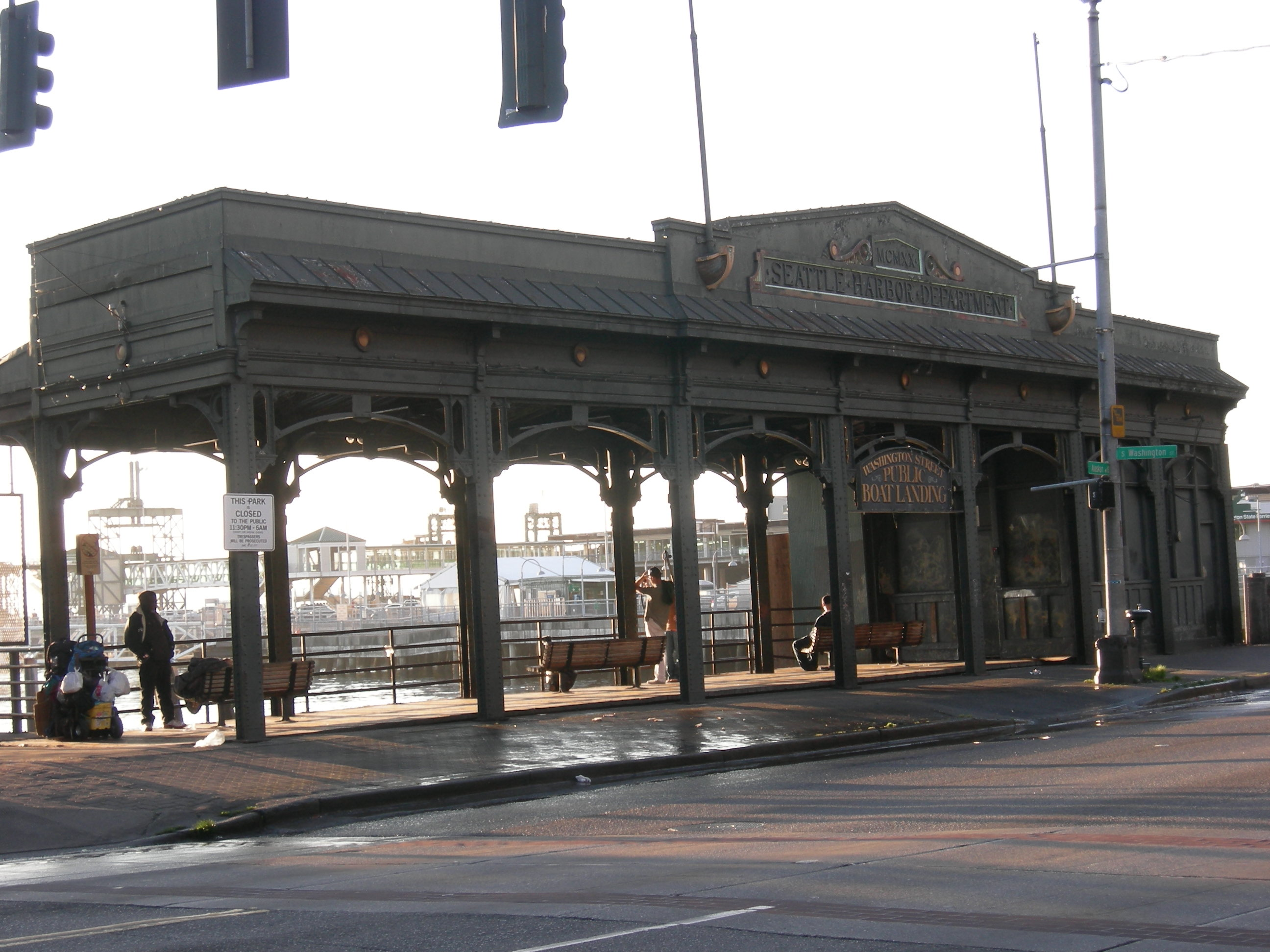
Washington Street Public Boat Landing Facility

Works include (with attribution):

- Smith House (Denver, Colorado), built 1902, "imposing" French Eclectic style mansion (William Ellsworth Fisher and Daniel R. Huntington), listed on the National Register of Historic Places (NRHP) in 1985
- First Methodist Episcopal Church (Seattle, Washington), built 1907–1910 (Schack and Huntington), NRHP-listed in 2011
- Northcliffe Apartments, demolished in 2008
- Wallingford Fire and Police Station, 1629 N. 45th St. Seattle, WA (Huntington,Daniel Riggs), NRHP-listed
- Washington Street Public Boat Landing Facility, built 1920, a pergola, S. Washington St. W of Alaskan Way, Seattle (Huntington, D.R.), NRHP-listed
- Seventh Street Theater, 313 Seventh St. Hoquiam, Washington (Huntington & Torbitt), NRHP-listed
- Seattle Public Library Fremont Branch, 731 N. 35th St., Seattle (Huntington, Daniel), NRHP-listed

Architect for Rainier Chapter House, NSDAR - 1925 - 800 Roy Street, Seattle, WA
