= Hello Robin =

Bakery in Seattle, Washington, U.S.

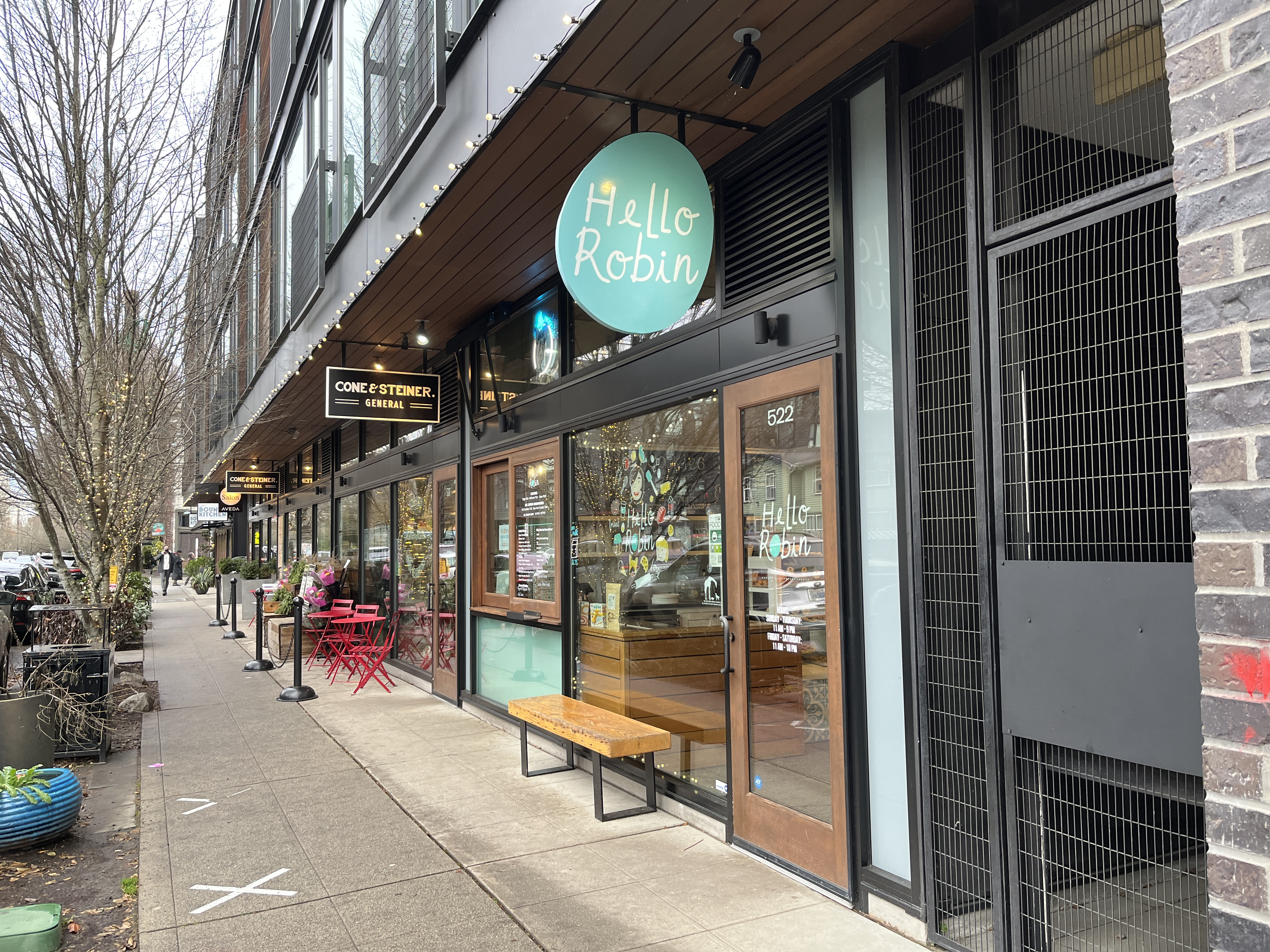
- Exterior of the shop on Capitol Hill, 2022
- Interactive map of Hello Robin

Restaurant information
- Established: 2013
- Owner: Robin Wehl Martin
- Head chef: Robin Wehl Martin
- Location: 522 19th Avenue East, Seattle, King County, Washington, 98112, United States
- Coordinates: 47.6239°N 122.3071°W
- Website: hellorobincookies.com

Hello Robin is a woman-owned bakery with two locations in Seattle, in the U.S. state of Washington. The original bakery opened on Capitol Hill in 2013. A second location opened at University Village in 2020.

== Description ==
Hello Robin operates a bakery on Capitol Hill and another at University Village. The company's tagline is "Cookies you wish your mother had made." The menu has included Mackles'mores (a s'mores cookie with Theo chocolate chunks and ice cream), sugar cookies, and birthday cake cookies. The Snack Attack cookie has potato chips, dark chocolate, brown butter, and sea salt, and is topped with a small pretzel.

Other cookie varieties include brown butter snickerdoodles, lemon poppyseed, oatmeal raisin, chocolate chip (sometimes with whole wheat) and blueberry pancake. Hello Robin sells baked cookies, raw cookie dough, and cookie ice cream sandwich with Molly Moon's Homemade Ice Cream. The Capitol Hill location also has an espresso bar. Hello Robin has sold Robin's Nest seasonal chocolate mousse dough balls seasonally.

== History ==
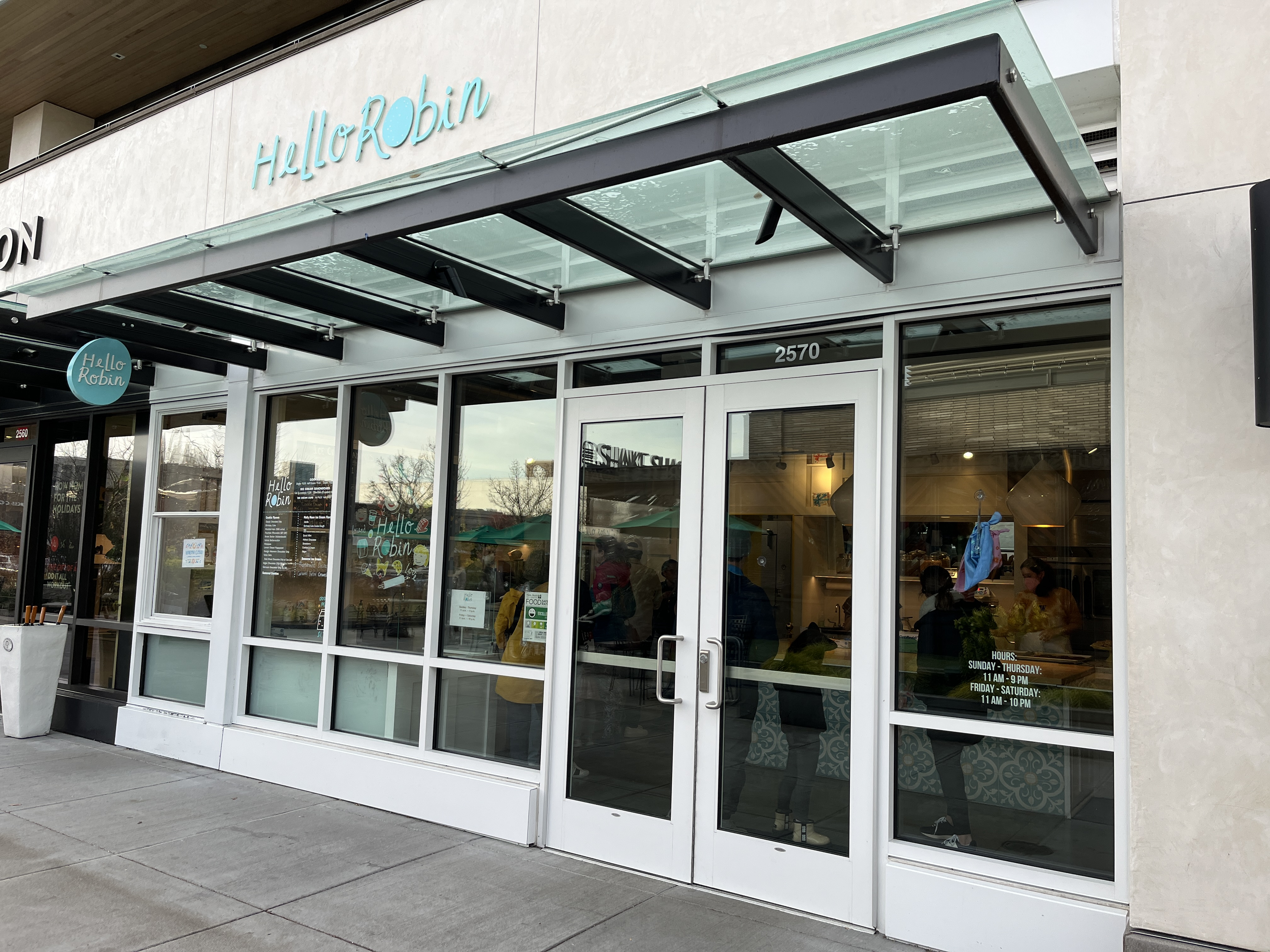
Exterior of the University Village location, 2023

The original bakery on Capitol Hill opened in 2013. The second location at University Village opened in 2020. Robin Wehl Martin is a co-owner.

Rachel's Ginger Beer has used chunks of chocolate chip cookies from Hello Robin.

== Reception ==
Catherine Allchin included the sugar cookies in The Seattle Times' 2014 list of the 12 "best bakery desserts for the holidays". Cosmopolitan's Helin Jung selected Hello Robin for Washington in a 2016 list of the best chocolate chip cookies in each U.S. state. Business Insider's Sarah Schmalbruch selected the Mexican chocolate cookie for Washington in a 2016 list of the best cookie in each state. The Not for Tourist Guide to Seattle (2016, 2017) describes the business as "the cookie bakery of your Pinterest dreams".

Chelsea Lin included Hello Robin in Seattle Magazine's 2017 list of Seattle's "stellar ice cream sandwich spots" and 2018 lists of the city's best and "tastiest" cookies. The business also won in the Best Cookies category of the newspaper's readers' polls in 2017 and 2018. The Seattle Post-Intelligencer's Christina Ausley included the chocolate chip ice cream sandwich (with sweet cream ice cream) and the mackles'more cookie in a 2019 list of "Seattle's busiest bakeries and their iconic pastries".

Hello Robin had the best and "most delicious" chocolate chip cookies in Washington, according to 2019, 2021, and 2022 lists compiled by Eat This, Not That in collaboration with Yelp. Aimee Rizzo included the business in The Infatuation's 2022 list of Seattle's best bakeries. Patty Lee and Scott Snowden included Hello Robin in Time Out's 2022 overview of the best cookies in the United States. Kurt Suchman included the business in Eater Seattle's 2025 overview of the city's best cookies.

== See also ==
- List of bakeries
- List of restaurant chains in the United States
