= Grant Cardone =

American financial influencer (born 1958)

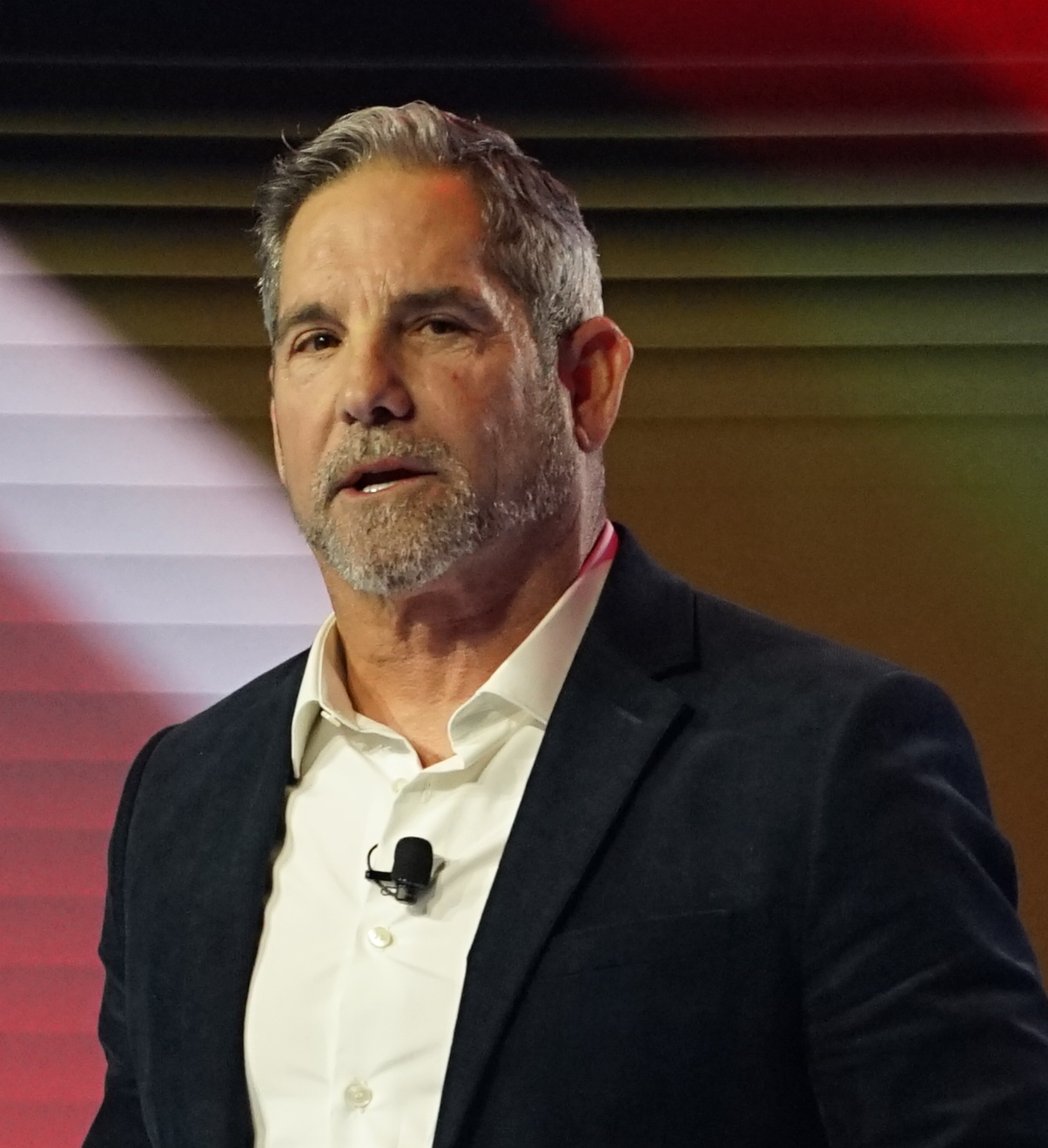
- Cardone in 2025
- Born: Grant Timothy Cardone; March 21, 1958 (age 68); Lake Charles, Louisiana, U.S.
- Education: McNeese State University (BS)
- Spouse: Elena Rosaia (m. 2004)
- Children: 2
- Website: Official website

Grant Timothy Cardone (born March 21, 1958) is an American businessman, financial influencer, and writer. He is the founder and CEO of Cardone Capital and Cardone Training Technologies, Inc. In 2010, he wrote the New York Times bestselling book, If You're Not First, You're Last.

== Early life ==
Born on March 21, 1958, in Lake Charles, Louisiana, Cardone is one of five children of Curtis Louis and Concetta Neil Cardone. His father owned a grocery store and had also trained as a stockbroker. When Cardone was 10 years old, his father died. A decade later, his brother Curtis also died.

Cardone graduated from La Grange High School in Lake Charles in 1976 and went on to earn a degree in accounting from McNeese State University. Between the ages of 16 and 25, Cardone struggled with drug and substance abuse, experiencing three overdoses before ultimately entering a treatment center.

== Career ==
After graduating from university, Cardone worked in a sales training company, where he traveled from Lake Charles to Houston, Texas and then to La Jolla, California, where he lived for 12 years. He moved into car sales and later became the president and CEO of Freedom Motorsports Group Inc. He owns Cardone Group, Cardone Enterprises and Cardone Real Estate Holdings.

In 2016, Forbes listed Cardone as one of the "25 Marketing Influencers To Watch In 2017". As of 2023, HuffPost estimated that Cardone has 2.4 million subscribers on YouTube; 4.4 million and 6.8 million followers on Instagram and Facebook respectively.

In late 2024, Cardone launched a bitcoin real estate fund.

== Legal issues ==
=== Cardone Training Technologies ===
In 2015 and 2016, several former employees of Cardone Training Technologies filed religious discrimination complaints with the Equal Employment Opportunity Commission alleging that they were fired for refusing to take Scientology training courses disingenuously renamed as "L. Ron Hubbard training".

Cardone's company has sued several clients who could no longer afford the hefty monthly payments on their training contracts. Having no termination clauses, clients were sued for tens of thousands of dollars of remaining balances on their contracts.

=== Cardone Capital ===
Cardone Capital purchases and manages large quantities of multifamily rental properties and sells shares in the pooled investment. In 2024 Cardone Capital claimed to have approximately four billion dollars in assets under management. Using his social media and other communication channels, Cardone tells potential investors that they should view "their own houses as a money-sinking liability rather than a real estate asset", that they should rent, and invest their money in his funds, which he has guaranteed 15% annualized returns. The Securities and Exchange Commission (SEC) has warned him to moderate his sales pitches.

In 2020, a client sued Grant Cardone and Cardone Capital, LLC for violating SEC regulations regarding potential misstatements or omissions. The lawsuit, a putative class action, cited Cardone's own words: "You're gonna walk away with a 15% annualized return. If I'm in that deal for 10 years, you're gonna earn 150%. You can tell the SEC that's what I said it would be. They call me Uncle G and some people call me Nostradamus, because I'm predicting the future, dude; this is what's gonna happen." A Federal District Court in California dismissed the plaintiff's claims, saying that statements on social media were not actionable under the Securities Act, but the US Court of Appeals reversed the dismissal, stating that "sellers of securities that use social media communications to communicate with prospective investors are engaged in solicitation that can be actionable under the Securities Act". An amended complaint was filed in 2023 by a family member of the plaintiff who had died since the original filing.

Paul Pelletier, who was the Department of Justice's most senior fraud prosecutor during a 25-year career at the agency, reviewed the documents in the class action case against Cardone. "It looks like his business is built on lies and deception that will likely collapse leaving investors holding an empty bag," he said.

— BuzzFeed News

A 2022 investigative report by The Palm Beach Post showed that from 2018 to 2021 Cardone Capital-owned Miami-area apartment complex Wellington Club overcharged tenants for workforce housing — a government program to provide discounted housing in high-cost-of-living areas to renters employed in key industries such as nursing, teaching and firefighting who would otherwise be priced out of their service area. According to the report, this allowed Wellington Club to boost profits while suppressing the county's workforce housing program in a county with limited affordable housing.

In 2026, Brian H. Robb, a former Chief Marketing Officer of Cardone Capital, filed a $1 billion defamation lawsuit against Grant Cardone and Cardone Capital. The lawsuit alleged that Cardone made defamatory statements about Robb on Facebook and in communications with third parties following Robb's testimony in the investor lawsuit Pino v. Cardone on December 9, 2025. According to the complaint, Robb had previously acted as a whistleblower while employed at Cardone Capital and reported conduct to the FBI that he believed to be fraudulent. The lawsuit further alleged that Cardone and Cardone Capital used their social media platforms and public reach to disseminate the statements, causing significant reputational harm to Robb.

=== Others ===
On a 2023 livestream, Cardone got in a heated dispute with former T-Mobile US CEO John Legere who told him that "You are the biggest bullshit artist on the planet," called him "a con man of the highest order" and a "fucking fraud." In January 2024, Cardone sued Legere for $100 million, alleging defamation. In August, Cardone rejected an offer from Legere to settle out of court, and the parties agreed to a confidential settlement in January 2025.

In 2024 Cardone sued Formula One Group and Hard Rock Cafe alleging that his expensive watch had been stolen during a Miami Grand Prix event as a result of lax security.

In 2025, Bobbi Awad, also known as Bobbi Vargas, a Las Vegas woman was charged with stealing millions from seven influencers including $2.3 million from the Cardones.

== Personal life ==
Cardone married Elena Rosaia Lyons on July 4, 2004. They have two daughters. The Cardones reside in Golden Beach, Florida and Malibu, California. Cardone is a Scientologist, and according to The Village Voice he had reached the OT VIII level as of 2011. Elena is also a Scientologist and the couple are major donors to the Church of Scientology.

Elena fundraised for Kari Lake in 2024 and is active in her husband's businesses. Following the New York business fraud lawsuit against the Trump Organization, Elena set up a GoFundMe to help Donald Trump pay off his multimillion-dollar legal judgments. Cardone has been a consistent supporter of Donald Trump, and even engaged Trump as the headliner at one of Cardone's 10X conferences in 2022.

== Published works and media appearances ==
Cardone has written five books: The 10X Rule, Sell or Be Sold, Closers Survival Guide, If You’re Not First, You’re Last, and Sell to Survive. He is a regular contributor to Fox & Friends and has been featured in the Wall Street Journal, and has appeared on CNBC, CNN. He has also appeared on Turnaround King and Undercover Billionaire.
