= Marvin Vincent =

Presbyterian minister and writer

Marvin Richardson Vincent (Poughkeepsie, New York, 11 September 1834 – Forest Hills, New York, 18 August 1922) was a Presbyterian minister, best known for his Word Studies in the New Testament. From 1888, he was professor of New Testament exegesis and criticism at Union Theological Seminary, New York City.

Vincent graduated from Columbia University in 1851 where he was a member of the Philolexian Society, taught in the Columbia Grammar School, was professor of classics in the Troy Methodist University from 1858 to 1862; then acting pastor of the Pacific Street Methodist Episcopal Church in Brooklyn from 1862 to 1863; and pastor of the First Presbyterian Church of Troy, New York, from 1863 to 1873. Then at Presbyterian Church of the Covenant, a small Victorian Gothic church at 310 East 42nd Street.

== Works ==
- Johann Albrecht Bengel's Gnomon of the New Testament (Translator), Charlton T. Lewis and Marvin R. Vincent, Philadelphia and New York, 1864.
- Amusement A Force in Christian Training: Four Discourses William. H. Young, New York, 1867.
- The Minister's Handbook Containing Forms for Baptism, marriage, The Lord's Supper, Burial, and the Ordination of Elders and Deacons, with Classified Selections of Scripture for the Sick Room, Anson D. F. Randolph & Company, New York, 1882.
- God and Bread with Other Sermons, New York, Dodd, Mead, and Company, 1884.
- Word Studies in the New Testament, Charles Scribner and Sons, New York, 1887.
- That Monster The Higher Critic, Anson D. F. Randolph & Company, New York, 1894
- Age of Hildebrand, T & T Clark, Edinburgh, 1897
- A History of the Textual Criticism of the New Testament, MacMillan, New York, 1899
