= Columbia Grammar & Preparatory School =

Private school in New York City

Location
- 5 West 93rd Street; New York, New York 10025; United States; 40°47′25″N 73°58′01″W

Information
- Type: Private, Day, College-Prep
- Religious affiliation: Nonsectarian
- Established: 1764; 262 years ago
- Principal: Abby Rojas, Michelle Schackman, & Scott Wilson
- Headmaster: Rey Fernández
- Grades: Pre-Kindergarten – 12
- Gender: Coeducational
- Enrollment: 1300+
- Student to teacher ratio: 5.7:1
- Campus type: Urban
- Colors: Columbia blue and white
- Athletics conference: NYSAISAA; PSAA
- Mascot: Leo The Lion
- Team name: Lions
- Accreditation: NYSAIS; MSA
- Tuition: $66,340–$69,960 (2026-27)
- Affiliations: New York Interschool
- Website: www.cgps.org

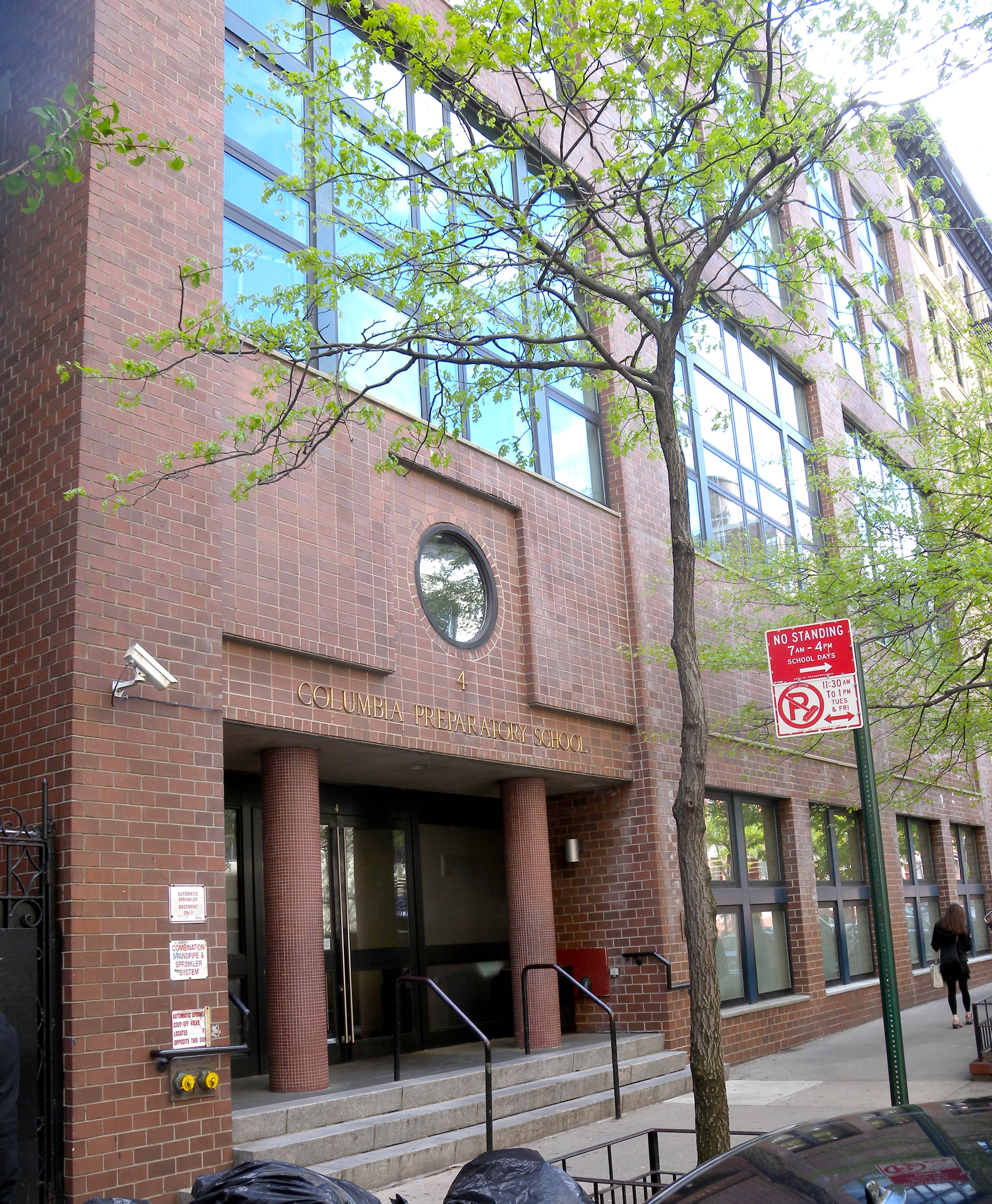
4 West 93rd

Columbia Grammar & Preparatory School ("Columbia Grammar", "Columbia Prep", "CGPS", "Columbia") is a school at 5 West 93rd Street on the Upper West Side of Manhattan in New York City. The oldest nonsectarian independent school in the city, it serves students from pre-kindergarten through the twelfth grade and offers a college preparatory curriculum.

It was founded in 1764 by what is now Columbia University to teach future freshmen English, Greek, and Latin grammar. The school was originally called The Grammar School of King's College, after the original name of Columbia University. When the college changed its name during the American Revolution, so did the school, to Columbia Grammar School.

The school dissolved its formal ties with Columbia in 1865. The word "preparatory" was added in 1969.

The school has existed in several locations. In 1907, the school moved to its current location on 93rd Street, off Central Park West. Originally consisting of one building, it added five brownstones through its 1956 merger with the adjacent Leonard School for Girls. A building across the street was built in 1984, followed by two more in 1997 and 2001. An administration building was added to the school in 2009.

== History ==
The school was founded in 1764 by the 10-year-old King's College as a preparatory school. It ran for 100 years under the direct auspices of the college.

One of the most illustrious headmasters during that period was Charles Anthon, one of America's earliest and most distinguished classical scholars. During his tenure, the Grammar School provided over half the students to Columbia College's freshman class.

In 1864, when Anthon retired as headmaster, the trustees of Columbia College ended their relationship with the Grammar School and the school became a proprietary institution. It would gain nonprofit status in 1941.

In 1937, the Leonard School for Girls was founded, using several interconnected brownstones on West 94th Street (now part of the lower school). The school joined with the Grammar School in 1956 to become a coed institution.

Richard J. Soghoian, who became the school's 13th headmaster in 1981, guided the physical expansion of the school from its 1906 home at 5 West 93rd Street to the present complex, which totals 215,000 square feet (20,000 m^{2}) with 14 buildings between 92nd and 94th streets. Soghoian retired in 2017.

In 2017, William Donohue was headmaster, Sarah McLean was the Grammar School director (a predecessor, Stanley Seidman, retired in 2010), Paul Baly was the Middle School director, and Joanie Dean was the Prep School director.

In 2024, William N. Moseley joined as the 15th Head of School. Abigail Rojas was the Grammar School director, Michelle Schackman was named Middle School director, and Dr. Scott Wilson was the Prep School director.

In 2026, Rey Fernández was named as the 16th Head of School, moving from his previous title as Assistant Head of School. Abigail Rojas was the Grammar School director, Michelle Schackman was the Middle School director, and Dr. Scott Wilson was the Prep School Director

== Accreditation ==
Columbia Grammar & Preparatory School is a fully independent, non-sectarian school governed by a board of trustees composed of alumni and parents. The school is accredited by the New York State Association of Independent Schools, the Middle States Association of Colleges and Schools, and the New York State Board of Regents.

The school is a member of the Independent School Admissions Association of Greater New York (ISAAGNY).

== Campus ==
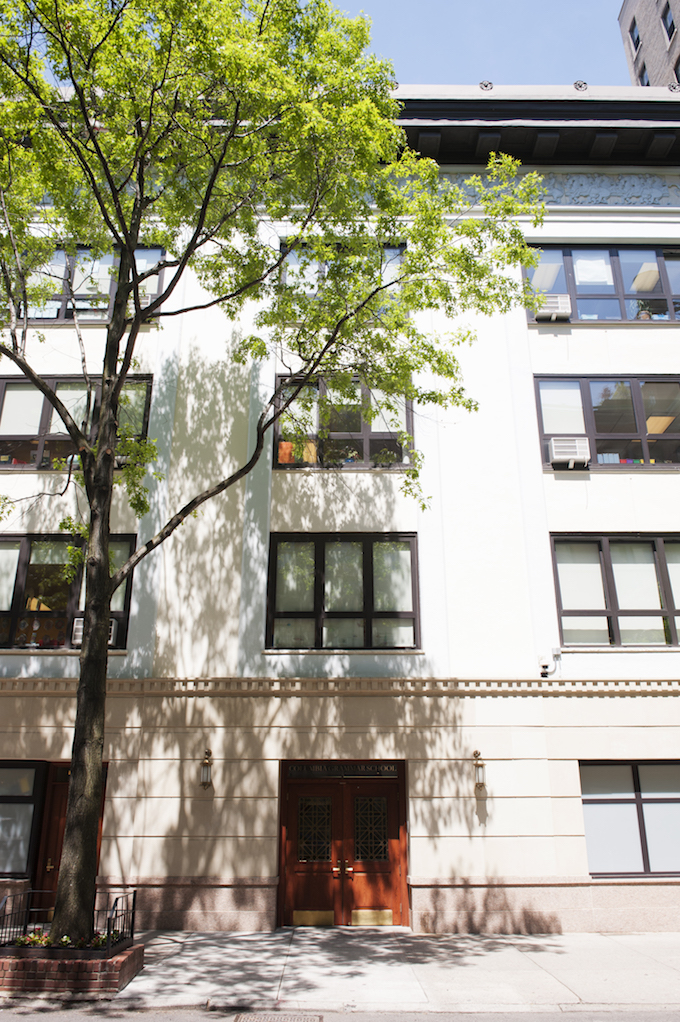
5 West 93rd Street

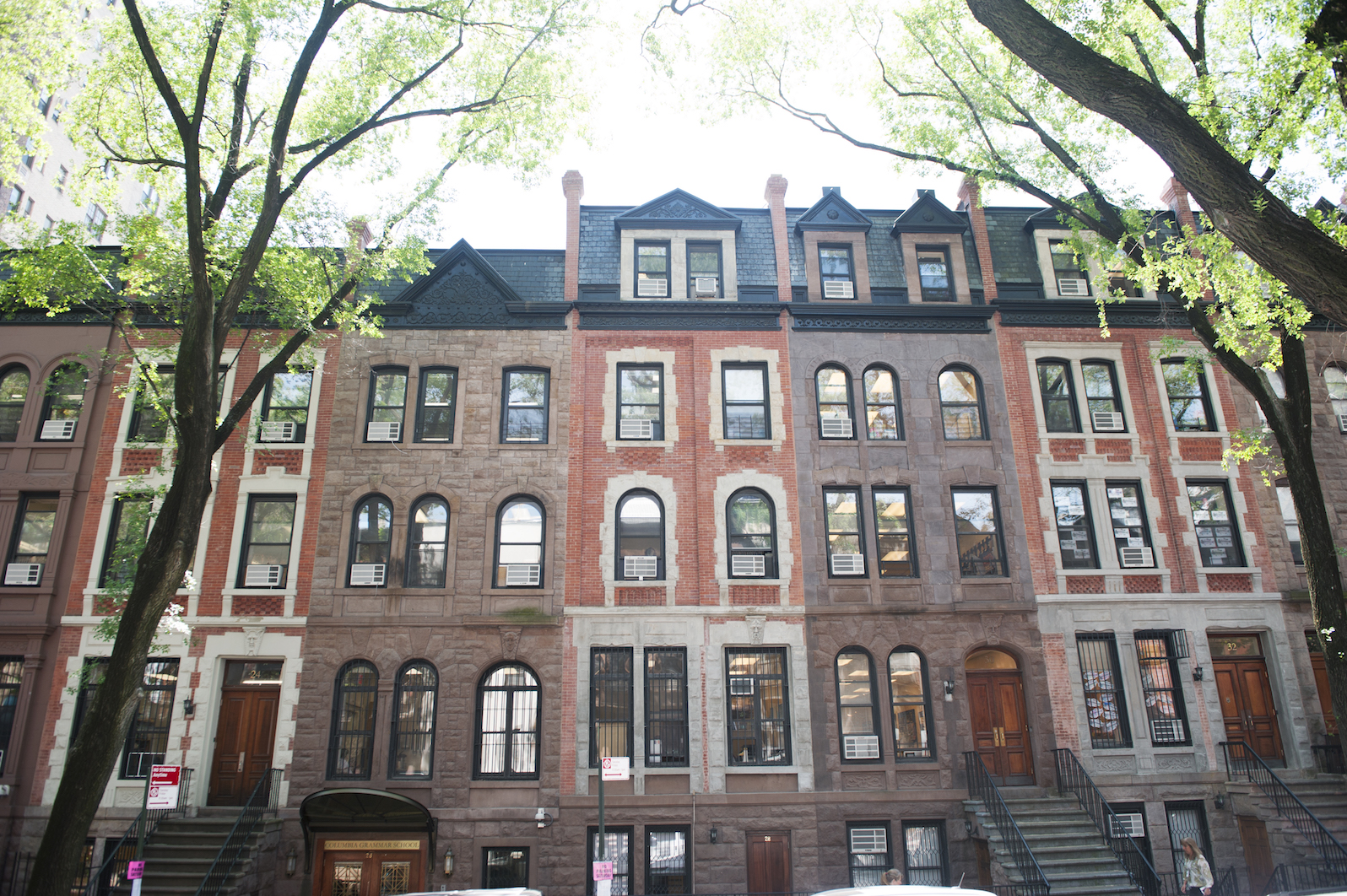
94th Street Brownstones

In 1984, the school built a new Preparatory School at 4 West 93rd, containing a full-sized gymnasium, three science labs, state-of-the art computer lab, library, three music studios, and nine classrooms.

Columbia Grammar & Preparatory School greatly expanded its physical plant after 1985. Three new buildings and a fully renovated brownstone have, together with the existing buildings, added academic facilities as well as two new theaters, several computer labs, a variety of art studios and space for a growing music program. The Grammar School is located in a series of five interconnecting brownstones on 94th Street just off Central Park, and the 1905 Columbia Grammar School building at 5 West 93rd Street. In addition to classrooms, these house two libraries, two art studios, a gymnasium, swimming pool, two music studios, a science lab, a computer lab, and the Grammar School cafeteria.

In 1996, 36 West 93rd Street was completed, adding 42,500 square feet (3,950 m^{2}) of space to the physical plant. This building, which goes through from 93rd to 92nd Street, has two computer labs, five art studios, library, science labs, and classrooms for grades 5 and 6, a fully equipped theater, and a large cafeteria.

In September 2001, the school added five classrooms, another full-sized gym, a state-of-the-art theater, and three floors of classrooms and science labs.

Since then, many brownstones have been added, one entirely for offices, and one building dedicated to the arts. A walkway has been built behind the multiple brownstones to make them easier to navigate. In 2009, CGPS purchased several new brownstones, one entirely for the kindergarten, another for a science building, and one for administrative offices. The Prep School also added a new level to its library.

The new CGPS Middle School opened its doors to students in grades 5, 6 and 7 on Thursday, September 8, 2016. Two floors were added to the existing 36 West 93rd Street building to create a 6th and 7th floor solely for these grades, while the remainder of the building has been renovated. The ground floor now features an expansive yoga and dance studio; the existing Prep School cafeteria has been renovated and a second floor cafeteria was added specifically for Middle School students. New art studios as well as a new library, three science labs, a rooftop play yard and twelve classrooms have been added to the building. The HVAC system has been updated and the building is fully handicap-accessible.

== Headmasters ==
- Matthew Cushing (1764–1772)
- Alexander Leslie (1772–1776)
- William Cochran (1784–1788)
- Joseph Nelson (1788–1828)
- John D. Ogilby (1828–1830)
- Charles Anthon (1830–1864)
- George W. Bacon (1864–1869)
- Richard S. Bacon (1864–1892)
- Benjamin H. Campbell (1869–1920)
- George A. Kohut (1920–1933)
- Frederic A. Alden (1920–1956), headmaster emeritus (1956–1964)
- James W. Stern (1956–1980)
- Richard Soghoian (1981–2017)
- William Donohue (2018–2024)
- William N. Moseley (2024-2026)
- Rey Fernández (2026-present)

== Notable alumni ==
- Felix Adler – Jewish leader who founded the Ethical Culture movement
- Richard Adler – lyricist, writer, composer and producer
- Marc Tyler Arnold – chess grandmaster
- David Gelb - creator of “Chef’s Table” on Netflix and Director of “Jiro Dreams of Sushi”
- Charles Benenson – real estate developer and investor
- Jeremy Bernstein – scientist and writer
- John Vernou Bouvier III – stockbroker and father of Jackie Onassis
- Calvin G. Child – former Judge and US Attorney for Connecticut
- Francis Pharcellus Church — journalist, author of "Yes, Virginia, there is a Santa Claus"
- George Gosman DeWitt – philanthropist and lawyer
- Abram J. Dittenhoefer – lawyer and judge
- Thomas C. E. Ecclesine – New York State Senator
- George L. Engel – psychiatrist who formulated the biopsychosocial model
- Bernard M. L. Ernst – American lawyer and magician
- John Erskine – professor at Columbia University
- Francis Blackwell Forbes – botanist and opium trader
- Josh Fox – filmmaker (HBO documentaries Gasland, Gasland Part II), theatre director, founder of International Wow Company.
- Peter Gelb – general manager of the Metropolitan Opera
- Murray Gell-Mann (valedictorian) – Nobel Prize winner for the discovery of quarks and other subatomic particles.
- Sarah Michelle Gellar – actress (attended through 8th grade)
- Scott Goldstein – television and film writer, producer and director
- Richard James Horatio Gottheil – Jewish scholar and Zionist
- Harry Frank Guggenheim – businessman and aviator
- Zack Hample – Major League Baseball collector, who caught Alex Rodriguez's 3,000th career hit and Mike Trout's first career home run.
- Lorenz Hart – lyricist who worked with Richard Rogers
- Gilbert Ray Hawes – lawyer and writer
- Hamilton Holt – former president of Rollins College
- Daniel Riggs Huntington – architect
- Gabriel Katzka – theater, film, and television producer
- Nicholas Kaufmann – author
- Edward King – President of New York Stock Exchange; 34th President of Saint Nicholas Society of the City of New York
- Rufus King (general) – Civil War union brigadier general
- Jeff Klein - hotelier and real estate developer
- Alex Kotlowitz – author and filmmaker
- Emile Henry Lacombe – United States Circuit Judge of the United States Court of Appeals
- Edgar J. Lauer – lawyer and judge
- Julius Gareché Lay – United States Ambassador to Honduras and Uruguay
- Sam A. Lewisohn – first president of the American Management Association
- Alfred Lilienthal – critic of Zionism
- Herman Melville – author of Moby-Dick (attended through 6th grade)
- William Dennistoun Murphy – 47th President of Saint Nicholas Society of the City of New York
- Hans Niemann – chess grandmaster
- John Dyneley Prince – leader of both houses of the New Jersey Legislature
- Daniel Pinchbeck - Author
- John Podhoretz – political columnist and film critic
- Susan Poser - President of Hofstra University (attended through 8th grade)
- The Postelles – Indie rock band, whose members attended Columbia Prep.
- T.J. Oakley Rhinelander – real estate magnate
- Nicole Ross (born 1989) - Olympic foil fencer
- Steve Ross – former CEO of Time Warner
- Jacob Ruppert – New York representative and owner of New York Yankees
- Haley Sacks - financial influencer known as MrsDowJones
- Benny Safdie – filmmaker
- Josh Safdie – filmmaker
- Ben Schnetzer – actor
- Edwin Robert Anderson Seligman – economist
- Isaac Newton Seligman – banker and social reformist
- Julius Seligson (1909–1987) – tennis player
- Ally Sheedy (born 1962) – actress known for her role of Allison Reynolds in The Breakfast Club
- Stephen Shore – photographer who pioneered the use of color in art photography
- David Stearns – president of baseball operations for the New York Mets.
- John Stone Stone – inventor
- Oscar Straus – United States Secretary of Commerce and Labor under Theodore Roosevelt
- George Templeton Strong – diarist and lawyer
- Rod Thorn – President of the Philadelphia 76ers (attended through 8th grade)
- Jeffrey Toobin – former legal analyst for CNN and The New Yorker
- Dwight Townsend – New York Congressman
- Barron Trump – U.S. President Donald Trump's youngest son (attended through 8th grade)
- Eugene Paul Ullman – impressionist painter
- Oliver A. Unger – motion picture and television producer, distributor and exhibitor
- Rainer Weiss – Professor Emeritus at MIT and 2017 Nobel Prize winner (Physics)
- Richard Grant White – musical critic and scholar
- Gary Winick – director of Tadpole, 13 Going on 30, and Charlotte's Web (2006 version)
- Lee S. Wolosky – former U.S. Special Envoy for Guantanamo closure
- David Wolper – television producer, Roots and Willy Wonka & the Chocolate Factory

== Notable teachers ==
- Joel Benjamin – Chess grandmaster and 3 time U.S. Chess Champion. U.S. Open champion in 1985.
- Henry Churchill de Mille – Businessman and theater actor and playwright.
- Albert Field – Dalí archivist.
- Fiorello H. La Guardia – 99th Mayor of New York City and 4-term Congressman.
- Andrew Lippa – Author and theater composer, lyricist, performer, and producer.
- Michael Rohde – U.S. chess grandmaster and attorney at law. U.S. Open champion in 1991.
- Marvin Terban – Children's book author.
- Marvin Vincent – Presbyterian minister and professor of classics and New Testament exegesis and criticism.
