= Wallingford Fire and Police Station =

- U.S. National Register of Historic Places
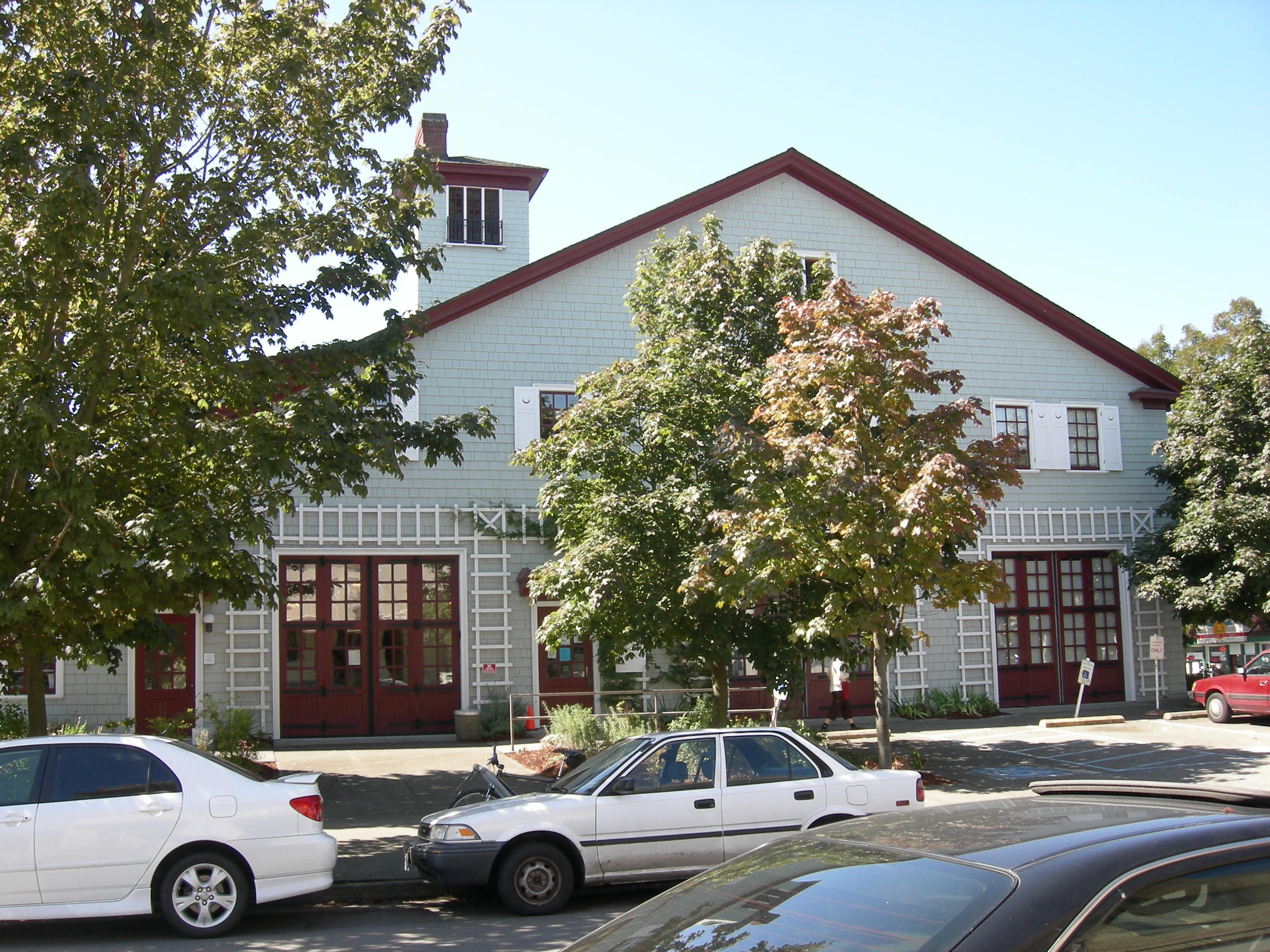

- Location within Washington (state) Location within the United States
- Location: 1629 N. 45th St., Seattle, Washington
- Coordinates: 47°39′42″N 122°20′09″W
- Area: less than one acre
- Built: 1913, 1921, 1965
- Architect: Daniel Riggs Huntington
- NRHP reference No.: 83003347
- Added to NRHP: January 27, 1983

The Wallingford Fire and Police Station, also known as the Wallingford Police Precinct Station, at 1629 N. 45th St. in Seattle, Washington was built in 1913. It was listed on the National Register of Historic Places in 1983.

It was designed by architect Daniel Riggs Huntington to house Seattle Fire Department's station #11 and the Seattle Police Department's station #6, which occupied the southern third of the building. It is a two-story 62 by 85 feet (19 m × 26 m) wood-frame building with a partial basement. It was built in 1913, then modified in 1921 when horse-drawn equipment was retired, then remodeled again in 1965.
