= F5 Tower =

660-foot-tall skyscraper in Downtown Seattle, Washington

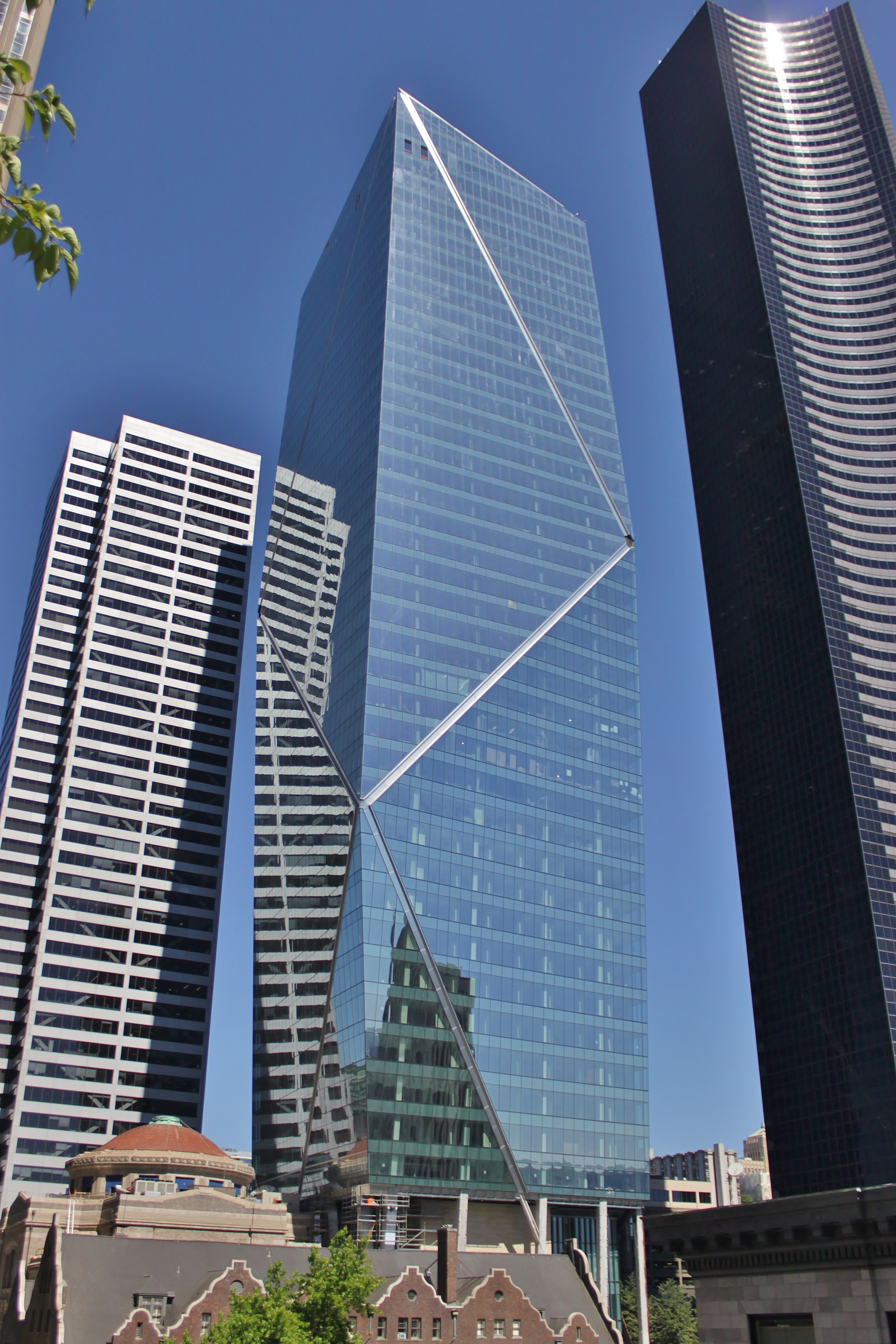
- Under construction in July 2017

- Location within downtown Seattle
- Former names: The Mark, Fifth and Columbia Tower

General information
- Status: Completed
- Type: Mixed-use: hotel and office building
- Location: 801 5th Avenue, Seattle, Washington, U.S.
- Coordinates: 47°36′19″N 122°19′52″W
- Groundbreaking: 2014
- Completed: May 2017
- Cost: $450 million
- Owner: KKR

Height
- Tip: 660 ft (200 m)

Technical details
- Floor count: 44
- Floor area: 761,493 sq ft (70,745.0 m^{2})

Design and construction
- Architect: Zimmer Gunsul Frasca
- Developer: Daniels Real Estate
- Structural engineer: Arup, Coughlin Porter Lundeen
- Main contractor: JTM Construction

Website
- f5tower.cbre-properties.com

F5 Tower (previously The Mark and Fifth and Columbia Tower) is a 660-foot-tall (200 m) skyscraper in Downtown Seattle, Washington. It consists of 44 floors and is the sixth-tallest building in Seattle.

The tower consists of 516,000 square feet (47,900 m^{2}) of office space leased entirely by F5 and a 189-room luxury hotel operated by Lotte Hotels & Resorts. The hotel, initially planned to open in 2017 under another operator, was officially opened in September 2020. It was designed by Zimmer Gunsul Frasca and was being developed by Daniels Real Estate. While it was being built during Seattle's historic building boom, the F5 Tower was the most expensive building under construction.

The tower was built next to the former First Methodist Episcopal Church. Although the education wing was demolished to make room for the tower, the remainder of the former church building has been preserved and has since been re-purposed into Daniels Recital Hall.

The building was acquired by private equity firm KKR in December 2019 at an estimated cost of $440 million.

== Design ==
F5 Tower was designed by ZGF Architects with angular glass curtain walls, which were intended to mimic the silhouette of actress Audrey Hepburn as she appears in the 1961 film Breakfast at Tiffany's. It is 660 feet (200 m) tall and has 44 stories, with the top floor numbered 48 due to skipped numbers. The glass walls of the building were designed to regulate temperature and energy use by letting in some sun rays and reflecting others. It uses the same glass as the One World Trade Center in New York City. The building features an open office floorplan and an internal staircase system that encourages walking over elevator use: a design that was requested by F5, Inc. (then named F5 Networks), which leases 59 meeting rooms and 290 collaboration spaces in the building.

To achieve LEED Silver standards, the tower will have a system to capture rainwater for reuse, a 35-foot-tall (11 m) "living wall" where plants grow in a Columbia Street façade, and rooftop solar energy equipment. Plans called for the building to be smallest at its base with each floor a different size.

The building includes 516,000 square feet (47,900 m^{2}) of office space, which was leased for 14.5 years to F5 Networks for $360 million. The lower 13 floors include a hotel with 189 rooms. The hotel was originally designed and furnished for SLS Hotels, a luxury operator, but the original contract was terminated in 2017. Lotte Hotels & Resorts of South Korea bought the rights to the hotel and sanctuary in December 2019 for $175 million with financing from Hana Financial Group. Lotte Hotel Seattle, the company's 31st location, opened in September 2020 with 189 rooms on 16 floors.

== Construction ==
Shoring and excavation began in summer 2008 and was delayed due to economic conditions. Construction re-started in the summer of 2014. During construction, cables and shoring mechanisms left over from the construction of the Columbia Center in the 1980s were discovered, which led developer Daniels Real Estate to file a lawsuit in August 2015 against the owners of the Columbia Center. The building topped-out in July 2016. The building officially finished construction in May 2017.

== Incidents ==
On September 17, 2016, a construction elevator suddenly dropped multiple floors, injuring one of the three men aboard at the time. The exterior elevator was somewhere between the 33rd and 37th floors when high winds caused a power cord to slip and catch on a fall protection net outrigger.

The building was closed to all workers and visitors on March 2, 2020, for large-scale cleaning after an F5 employee came into contact with a person carrying COVID-19 coronavirus.

== See also ==
- List of tallest buildings in Seattle
