= Marc Tyler Arnold =

American chess grandmaster (born 1992)

Personal information
- Born: November 20, 1992 (age 33)

Chess career
- Country: United States
- Title: Grandmaster (2012)
- FIDE rating: 2517 (July 2026)
- Peak rating: 2540 (August 2012)

Marc Tyler Arnold (born November 20, 1992) is an American chess player who received the FIDE title of Grandmaster (GM) in September 2012.

== Chess career ==
Arnold became an International Master in 2009. Arnold's peak United States Chess Federation rating was 2640 in July 2012. In August 2012, he reached his peak FIDE rating of 2540 and earned the GM title.

Arnold won the US Junior (closed) Chess Championship in 2007 and 2012.

Arnold won his first game against a Grandmaster at the age of 10, defeating 6-time US Champion Walter Shawn Browne in 29 moves at the 104th US Open. At that time, as a young student, he worked on his game several days a week with National Master John Mac Arthur. Subsequent instructors included Grandmaster William Lombardy who included much chess culture and endgame technique, and Grandmaster Joel Benjamin. In 2008, Arnold played at the World Open chess tournament, where he defeated Vadim Milov. Much of Marc Arnold's development past Candidate Master to International Master can be attributed to his training with Grandmaster John Fedorowicz. British Champion and Grandmaster Mark Hebden worked with Marc during the World Junior Chess Championship in 2010. Grandmaster Yuri Shulman took over training for the accomplishment of the Grandmaster title.

Arnold is the first chess Grandmaster to graduate from Columbia Grammar and Prep School (CGPS) in New York, New York. He was discovered to be very apt at capturing by values and trading queens early. Sophia Rohde, wife of Grandmaster Michael Rohde, taught curriculum classes in Kindergarten and 1st Grade at Columbia Grammar and brought Arnold to the attention of NM John Mac Arthur during an after-school chess program in 1999. Arnold won the US National School Grade Championship (2nd Grade), Orlando, Florida in December 2000. Arnold graduated CGPS in 2011, becoming a founding member of the Columbia Grammar and Prep School Chess Hall of Fame.

== Personal life ==
Arnold graduated from Indiana University and is currently a Commodities Trader at a hedge fund in New York City.
