= Undercover Billionaire =

- Genre: Reality
- Country of origin: United States
- Original language: English
- No. of seasons: 2
- No. of episodes: 10

Production
- Executive producers: Aengus James; Carter Figueroa; Colin King Miller; Glenn Stearns; Joseph Boyle; Michelle Galster; Tim Warren
- Production locations: Erie, Pennsylvania
- Camera setup: Single-camera
- Running time: 41–83 minutes
- Production company: This is Just a Test

Original release
- Network: Discovery Channel; Discovery+
- Release: August 6, 2019 – April 14, 2021

Related
- Undercover Billionaire: Comeback City

Undercover Billionaire is an American reality television series broadcast on the Discovery Channel.

The first season, which first aired from August 6 to September 24, 2019, followed billionaire Glenn Stearns as he attempted to start a million-dollar business in Erie, Pennsylvania, in 90 days, starting with $100, a car, and a tank of gas. Stearns identified his target business, gathered a crew to help, built his initial $100 stake sufficiently to fund a startup company, and opened a barbecue restaurant named Underdog BBQ. The presence of a Discovery Channel film crew was explained by saying that they were trailing him for a documentary about building a small business from scratch.

A TV special titled Undercover Billionaire: Return To Erie premiered on August 18, 2020.

The second season, which premiered on January 6, 2021, followed three self-styled successful entrepreneurs (Grant Cardone, Monique Idlett-Mosley, and Elaine Culotti) in three cities as they attempt to create a business with a "valuation of $1 million" in 90 days. Season 2 also featured part of Undercover Billionaire: Comeback City, a show about Stearns' continuing work in Erie, that debuted in its entirety on Discovery Plus.

== Episodes ==
=== Series overview ===
Season	Episodes	Originally released		
Season	Episodes	First released	Last released	Network
1	8	August 6, 2019	September 24, 2019	Discovery Channel
Special		August 18, 2020		Discovery Channel
2	14	January 6, 2021	April 14, 2021	Discovery Channel; Discovery+

=== Season 1 (2019) ===
No. overall	No. in season	Title	Original release date	U.S. viewers (millions)	18-49 rating
1	1	"Million Dollar Bet"	August 6, 2019	1.04	0.30
2	2	"Start Up or Die Trying"	August 13, 2019	1.14	0.36
3	3	"Take the Bull by the Horns"	August 20, 2019	0.80	0.21
4	4	"House of Cards"	August 27, 2019	0.85	0.21
5	5	"No Pain, No Gain"	September 3, 2019	0.94	0.26
6	6	"Exposed"	September 10, 2019	0.93	0.29
7	7	"Trial by Fire"	September 17, 2019	0.93	0.27
8	8	"Final Reckoning"	September 24, 2019	1.04	0.28

=== Special (2020) ===
No.	Title	Original release date	U.S. viewers (millions)	18-49 rating
9	"Return to Erie"	August 18, 2020	0.66	0.14

=== Season 2 (2021) ===
No. overall	No. in season	Title	Discovery airdate	Discovery+ airdate	U.S. viewers (millions)	18-49 rating
10	1	"Three Million Dollar Bet"	January 6, 2021	January 6, 2021	0.40	0.11
11	2	"Hustle Up"	January 13, 2021	January 13, 2021	0.41	0.12
12	3	"Pressure Tests"	April 20, 2021	January 27, 2021	N/A	TBA
13	4	"Fist or Finesse"	April 27, 2021	February 3, 2021	N/A	TBA
14	5	"The Closers"	May 4, 2021	February 10, 2021	N/A	TBA
15	6	"Be Afraid, But Do It Anyway"	May 11, 2021	February 17, 2021	N/A	TBA
16	7	"Turning Points"	May 18, 2021	February 24, 2021	N/A	TBA
17	8	"Cocktail of Chaos"	May 25, 2021	March 3, 2021	N/A	TBA
18	9	"Dumpster Fire"	TBA	March 10, 2021	TBD	TBA
19	10	"Wake Up Call"	TBA	March 17, 2021	TBD	TBA
20	11	"The Manifesto"	TBA	March 24, 2021	TBD	TBA
21	12	"T-Minus 7 Days"	TBA	March 31, 2021	TBD	TBA
22	13	"Camel, Meet Straw"	TBA	April 7, 2021	TBD	TBA
23	14	"The Judgement Day"	TBA	April 14, 2021	TBD	TBA
