= Glenn Stearns =

American businessman (born 1963)

- Born: 1963 (age 62–63); Silver Spring, Maryland, US
- Occupation: Businessman
- Known for: founder of Stearns Lending
- Spouse: Mindy Burbano
- Children: 6

Glenn Bryan Stearns (born 1963) is an American businessman and the founder of Stearns Lending.

Stearns appeared in the Discovery Channel reality show Undercover Billionaire, during which he founded Underdog BBQ in Erie, Pennsylvania.

== Early life ==
Stearns was born in 1963 in Silver Spring, Maryland. His father was a printer and his mother was a grocery store clerk and house cleaner. The family lived in a low-income apartment complex in the suburbs of Washington, D.C. Stearns was a socially adept child but struggled in school. He was diagnosed with dyslexia, but his parents kept this from him. He was humiliated when he failed the fourth grade. Stearns' parents divorced when he was 17.

== Career ==
Stearns founded Stearns Lending in 1989. He was chief executive officer (CEO) from its founding until May 2012 when Stearns named Brian Hale, former president and national production executive of MetLife Home Loans, as his successor. Stearns Lending was the fifth-largest privately held mortgage lender in the US in 2013.

== Personal life ==
In October 2003, Stearns married Mindy Burbano, who was an entertainment reporter for Entertainment Tonight and KTLA in Los Angeles. They live in Jackson Hole, Wyoming. In addition to Charlene, Stearns has three sons named Skyler, Colby, and Trevor and two daughters who often appear on Burbano's Instagram. Stearns also has two grandchildren.

In 2004, Stearns and Burbano appeared on the TBS reality TV show, The Real Gilligan's Island as "the millionaire and his wife", and he "won" the competition. In 2014, he was diagnosed with squamous cell carcinoma, which inspired him to be involved with reality TV. In 2019, the Discovery Channel TV show, Undercover Billionaire followed Stearns as he built a startup company from scratch. During the filming of the show he had a recurrence of cancer.
