= F5, Inc. =

U.S. information technology company

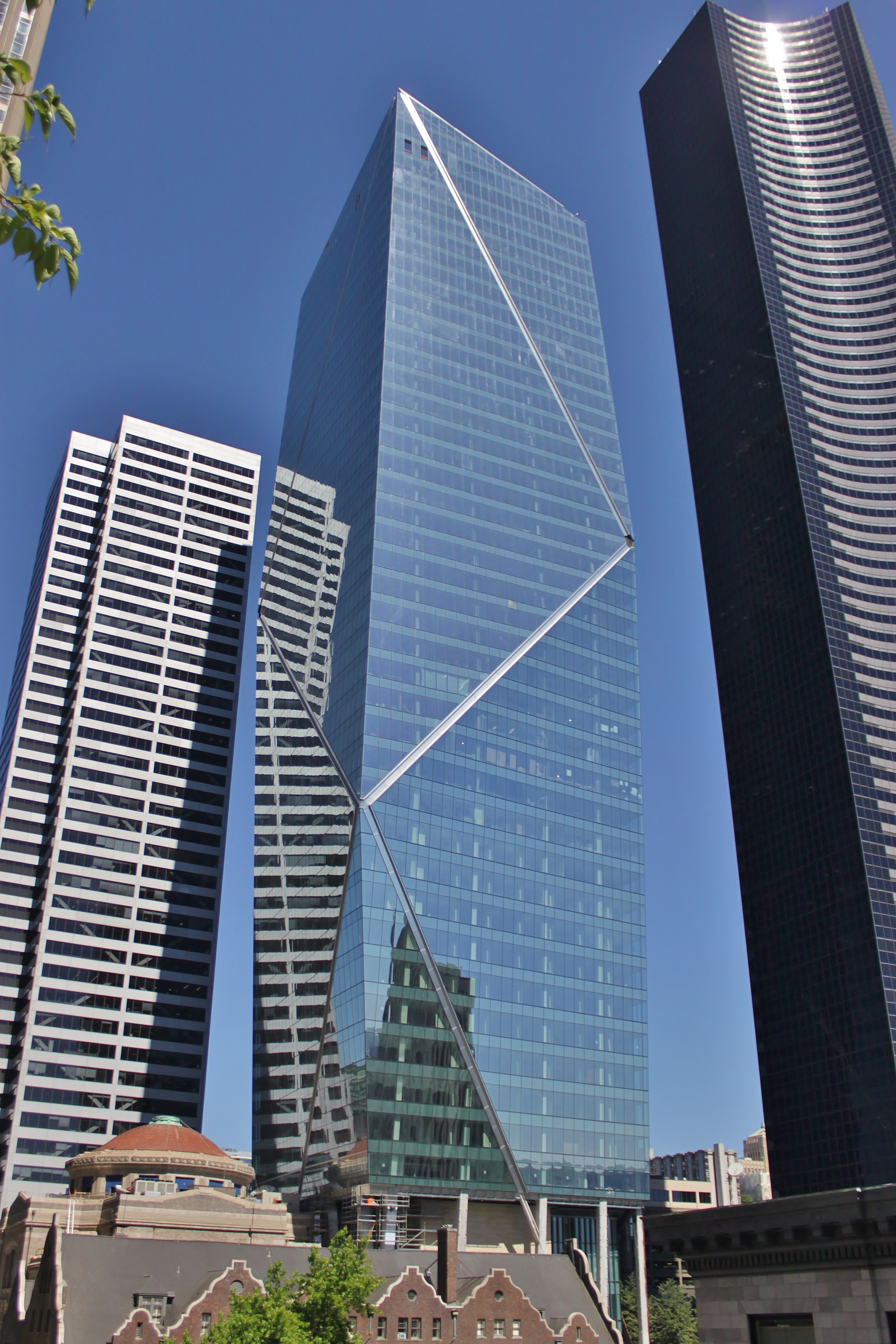
- Headquarters at F5 Tower
- Formerly: F5 Labs, Inc. (1996–1999); F5 Networks, Inc. (1999–2021)
- Type: Public
- Traded as: Nasdaq: FFIV; S&P 500 component
- Industry: Technology
- Founded: February 26, 1996; 30 years ago
- Headquarters: F5 Tower; Seattle, Washington, U.S.
- Key people: François Locoh-Donou (president and CEO)
- Products: Application Security and Delivery
- Revenue: ▲US$3.09 billion (2025)
- Operating income: ▲US$766 million (2025)
- Net income: ▲US$692 million (2025)
- Total assets: ▲US$6.32 billion (2025)
- Total equity: ▲US$3.59 billion (2025)
- Number of employees: 6,578 (2025)
- ASN: 35280
- Website: f5.com
- Footnotes; Financials as of September 30, 2025.

F5, Inc. is an American technology company specializing in multicloud application delivery, API security, online fraud prevention, zero trust access, and enterprise AI workload security.

While F5 originally developed hardware-based application delivery controller (ADC) load-balancing appliances, the company has transitioned to a software-led business model. Software subscriptions and cloud-delivered services now account for a major portion of its product revenue, driven by a corporate shift toward predictable, recurring subscription models. The technological core of F5's platform portfolio is its Traffic Management Operating System (TMOS). F5 offers these services as virtual machines (branded as the BIG-IP Virtual Edition) that deploy programmatically across hybrid, multi-cloud, on-premises, and network edge environments to manage traffic, secure public APIs, and enforce zero-trust identity policies.

== History ==
F5, Inc., founded as F5 Networks, was established by Jeff Hussey in 1996. In June 1999, F5 went public through an initial public offering, listing on the NASDAQ stock exchange under the ticker symbol "FFIV." The company became F5 in November 2021.

F5's modern transition culminated in major expansions into application security and software services, supporting over 23,000 customers globally, including 48 of the Fortune 50 companies, who utilize the platform for hybrid multi-cloud application delivery, zero-trust network access, and API protection.

== Products ==
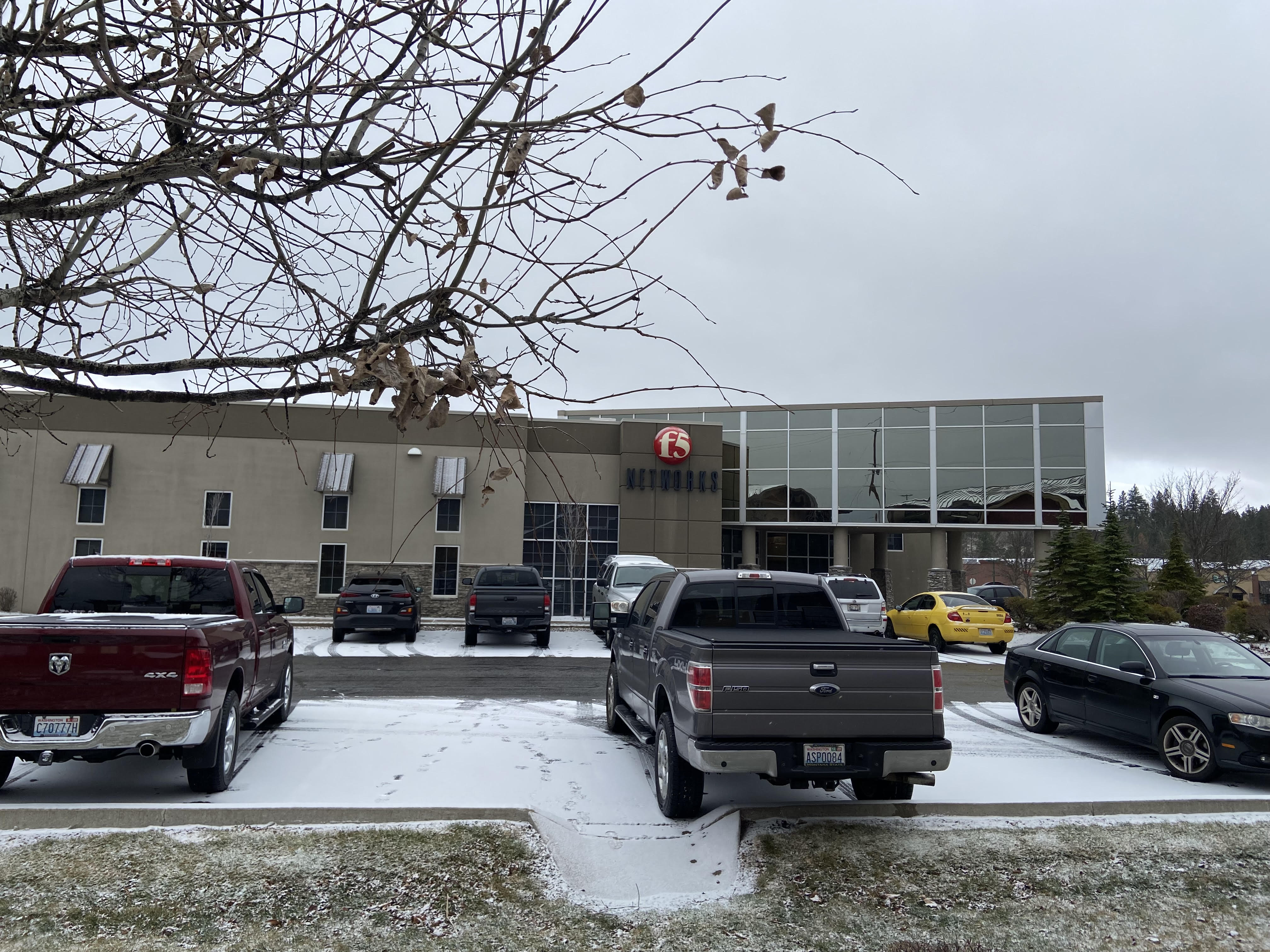
F5 site in Liberty Lake, Washington state, December 2021

=== F5 AI Security Platform ===
In June 2026, F5 introduced the F5 AI Security Platform, an enterprise security offering designed to govern, discover, test, and protect artificial intelligence applications, models, and autonomous software agents. The platform is built to operate across hybrid multi-cloud, on-premises, and air-gapped environments, targeting security challenges associated with agentic AI, such as prompt injection, data exfiltration, and excessive agent autonomy.

The platform's primary security capabilities are delivered through two components integrated into F5's portfolio:

- F5 AI Red Team: An automated adversarial testing system that simulates attacks on AI applications to identify vulnerabilities, such as jailbreak vulnerabilities and model data poisoning, prior to production deployment.
- F5 AI Guardrails: A real-time, inline semantic firewall that inspects user prompts and model-generated responses. It is designed to block injection attacks, filter out off-topic or toxic responses, and apply dynamic data loss prevention (DLP) parameters to prevent sensitive data leakage.

=== F5 Application Delivery and Security Platform (ADSP) ===
In 2025, F5 introduced the Application Delivery and Security Platform (ADSP), a unified offering that combines application delivery, API protection, and threat mitigation across hardware, software, and Software-as-a-Service (SaaS) environments. ADSP is designed to support hybrid and multicloud deployments and includes capabilities such as load balancing, web application firewalls, DDoS protection, and encrypted traffic inspection.

=== F5 BIG-IP ===
F5's BIG-IP product family comprises hardware, modularized software, and virtual appliances that run the F5 TMOS operating system. Depending on the appliance selected, one or more BIG-IP product modules can be added.

In 1997, the company introduced its flagship product, BIG-IP.

==== BIG-IP history ====
On September 7, 2004, F5 Networks released version 9.0 of the BIG-IP software in addition to appliances to run the software. Version 9.0 also marked the introduction of the company's TMOS architecture, with enhancements including:

- The move from BSD to Linux to handle system management functions (disks, logging, bootup, console access, etc.)
- The creation of a Traffic Management Microkernel (TMM) to directly talk to the networking hardware and handle all network activities.

=== F5 NGINX ===
Since the NGINX, Inc. acquisition in 2019, F5 has offered an enterprise offering of NGINX with advanced features, multiple support SLAs, and regular software updates.

=== F5 Distributed Cloud Services ===
During F5 Agility 2022, F5 announced a new product offering being built on the platforms of BIG-IP, Shape Security, and Volterra. The primary offering in this suite is the SaaS-based web application and API protection (WAAP). F5 Distributed Cloud Services enable organizations to deploy, secure, and manage their applications across various environments, including data centers, multi-cloud setups, and the network or enterprise edge.

== Acquisitions ==
=== 2003-2007 ===
F5 acquired uRoam, Inc. in 2003 for a total cash deal size of $25 million. F5 acquired MagniFire Websystems in 2004 for a total cash deal size of $29 million. MagniFire Websystems products were sold independently when the deal first closed, then were quickly bundled into the BIG-IP product group.

Swan Labs was purchased in September 2005 for a reported $43 million. Acopia Networks, Inc. was acquired in August 2007 for a reported $210 million.

=== 2012-2020 ===
In 2012, the company acquired Israeli-based Traffix Systems and integrated it into the F5 BIG-IP Local Traffic Manager (LTM) product line.

In February 2013, F5 Networks purchased LineRate Systems, a developer of software-defined networking (SDN) services, and in May 2014, it acquired Defense.Net, Inc., a company offering cloud-based DDoS mitigation services.

F5 acquired NGINX, Inc. in March 2019 for a reported $670 million.

In January 2020, F5 acquired Shape Security, Inc., an AI-based bot detection company, for $1 billion.

=== 2021-present ===
In January 2021, F5 acquired Volterra, Inc., an edge networking company that sells SaaS security services, for $500 million. The previously Volterra-branded products were incorporated into F5 Distributed Cloud Services, as of 2022. In October 2021, F5 acquired Threat Stack, Inc., a Boston cloud computing security startup company for a reported $68 million. As of December 15, 2022, the previous Threat Stack offering had been rolled into the F5 Distributed Cloud platform.

In January 2023, F5 announced it had entered into an agreement to purchase Lilac Cloud, an application services delivery provider. Lilac Cloud, based in Cupertino, California, served as F5's Content Delivery Network (CDN) provider for its Distributed Cloud Services. The entire Lilac Cloud offering was rolled into the overall F5 Distributed Cloud Services product line.

In July 2023, Suborbital Software Systems, Inc., a technology startup that aimed to build cloud-native platforms on WebAssembly, announced it had been acquired by F5, Inc. The details of this acquisition were not disclosed due to the small nature of Suborbital's operations. The entire Suborbital product was deployed within the F5 Distributed Cloud Services line.

In February 2024 at AppWorld, F5's application security conference in San Jose, California, F5 announced it had acquired Wib: an API security company based in Tel Aviv, Israel, focused on vulnerability detection and observability in application development. The financial details of the acquisition were not disclosed. As of February 2024, F5 was adding the Wib API intellectual property to the F5 Distributed Cloud Services product line.

In March 2024, F5 announced it had acquired Heyhack ApS, a Denmark-based security penetration SaaS company. The financial details of this acquisition were not disclosed. F5 announced Heyhack's automated security reconnaissance and penetration testing solution would be rolled into the F5 Distributed Cloud Services platform.

In March 2025, F5, Inc. acquired LeakSignal, a cybersecurity company specializing in real-time data protection and governance for AI applications. The acquisition aimed to enhance the F5 Application Delivery and Security Platform (ADSP) with capabilities such as AI-driven data classification, policy enforcement, and compliance monitoring. LeakSignal had been recognized by the National Institute of Standards and Technology (NIST) for its innovations in securing data in transit.

In June 2025, F5 acquired Fletch, Inc., a San Francisco cybersecurity startup founded in 2020 that developed agentic AI tools for threat detection and alert prioritization. Fletch’s technology was designed to analyze large volumes of threat intelligence and reduce alert fatigue by surfacing relevant security signals in real time, aiding operator decision-making. In August 2025, F5 acquired MantisNet, Inc., a Reston-based provider of eBPF-powered, cloud-native network observability and real-time network intelligence. MantisNet’s agentless telemetry technology enables visibility into encrypted, ephemeral, and east–west traffic within containerized environments and 5G architectures without performance overhead, streamlining observability and security functions in cloud-native deployments.

In September 2025, F5 announced its intent to acquire CalypsoAI, a Dublin-based startup specializing in runtime AI security and adaptive guardrails, for approximately $180 million. CalypsoAI’s platform offers techniques such as red teaming, inference-layer defenses, and policy enforcement suited for generative and agentic AI workloads. On September 29, 2025, F5 completed its acquisition of CalypsoAI and introduced F5 AI Guardrails and F5 AI Red Team.

In June 2026, F5 acquired Denver-based startup SurePath AI, a platform specializing in network-based artificial intelligence discovery and shadow AI detection. The acquisition's technology identifies corporate workforce usage of unauthorized AI tools and tracks agent behaviors at the network layer without requiring direct application integrations. The financial terms of the transaction were not disclosed.
