= Finance influencer =

Type of social media personality

A finance influencer, financial influencer or finfluencer is an individual who offers advice to the general public on managing finances through social media platforms. The advises directed to the financial investment and complications like stock investment, retail investment, trading, tax saving, cryptocurrency and other investment strategies. They create finance-related content to inform and educate their followers, helping them understand financial complications.

The World Economic Forum report The Future of Capital Markets: Democratization of Capital Markets 2022 acknowledges the rise of finfluencers because the lack of basic level financial advice services available to the general public. The report also discussed the characteristic of "finfluencer" as easy access to advice, inclusivity, and the risks associated with their content.

The International Organization of Securities Commissions's 2025 report highlighted the risk that financial influencers create for retail investor by overlapping the education and unlicensed financial advice. The Securities and Exchange Board of India (SEBI) in India also restricted unregistered financial influencers to give unverified investment tips.

== Evolution ==
Common people were always looking for guidance to invest money or buying-selling stocks. In 1920s, astrologer Evangeline Adams became famous after providing stock tips. In TV era, Jim Cramer a tv personality ran a show Mad Money and shaped people behaviour towards investment. The newspaper, print newsletter, and cable TV networks were guided the general public about the stock investment with expert insights during the media age. This pre-digital era has created a space for financial tips and guides as a news piece through personality-driven mass entertainment. Financial analyst and journalists had impact over the stock investment behaviour of people.

With the emergence of web 2.0, the forum like reddit and twitter(currently X) have created the space for peer-to-peer discussion over stock investment. Later, the micro-blogging prompts it to build a community where more insights and knowledge were available for common people. During the COVID-19 lockdown, the young generation moved to social media for financial knowledge, both as an influencer and viewer. Investing apps made it more accessible and ease for new generations during the lock-down. Personalities like Sharan Hegde, Tori Dunlap, Shreyaa Kapoor are the finfluencer from the covid period. This "finfluencer" is a global phenomenon. Financial firms are connecting with young finfluencers to engage with new generations.

== See also ==
- YouTuber
- Affiliate marketing
- Social Consumer
