= Tori Dunlap =

American investor, feminist, and social media personality

- Born: Tacoma, Washington, U.S.
- Education: University of Portland
- Occupations: Businesswoman; author; speaker; content creator

Instagram information
- Page: herfirst100k
- Followers: 2.2 million

TikTok information
- Page: herfirst100k
- Followers: 2.4 million

Tori Dunlap is an American businesswoman, author, podcaster, and speaker. She is the founder of 'Her First $100K', which is a financial education company aimed at young women.

== Early life and education ==
Dunlap is from Tacoma, Washington. At age nine, her father offered to help her start a candy vending machine business, getting her a machine for a $300 loan. After paying back the loan, she expanded to 15 machines, and added the profits to her college fund. When she was 20, she sold the business to a ten-year-old for $1,700.

Dunlap earned dual degrees, a Bachelor of Science in organizational communication and Bachelor of Arts in theatre from University of Portland in 2016. She graduated debt-free from college and credited that for her ability to accumulate savings of $100,000 by age 25.

== Career ==
After graduating from college, Dunlap began an entry-level job as a digital marketing manager in Seattle. At the age of 22, she started a financial education blog and began saving money towards a goal of amassing $100,000 at the age of 25. She reached that goal in 2019.

Dunlap founded Her First $100K, a financial education company aimed at young women. The company sells webinars and programs. It also produces a podcast; as of 2021, it had twelve employees. Her First $100K generates revenue through speaking engagements, social media, and financial coaching. Dunlap said her business grossed more than $3.4 million in 2021. That same year, her videos earned $15,000 each from her corporate sponsors. Dunlap has stated that she tries to align her company's business practices with her advice.

The New York Times compared Dunlap's advice to that of other millennial women financial influencers including Berna Anat, Melissa Jean-Baptiste, Delyanne, and Haley Sacks, whose advice follows in the tradition of advisors like Suze Orman. The paper said that the younger influencers tend to avoid some of the most common tropes of previous financial advice, like blaming listeners for wasting money on lattes.

In May 2021, Dunlap released a podcast, Financial Feminist. Dunlap subsequently released a book with HarperCollins, Financial Feminist, a New York Times bestseller.

== Personal life ==
Dunlap lives in Seattle with her boyfriend Pav, an athletics and education professional.
