= Haley Sacks =

American entrepreneur

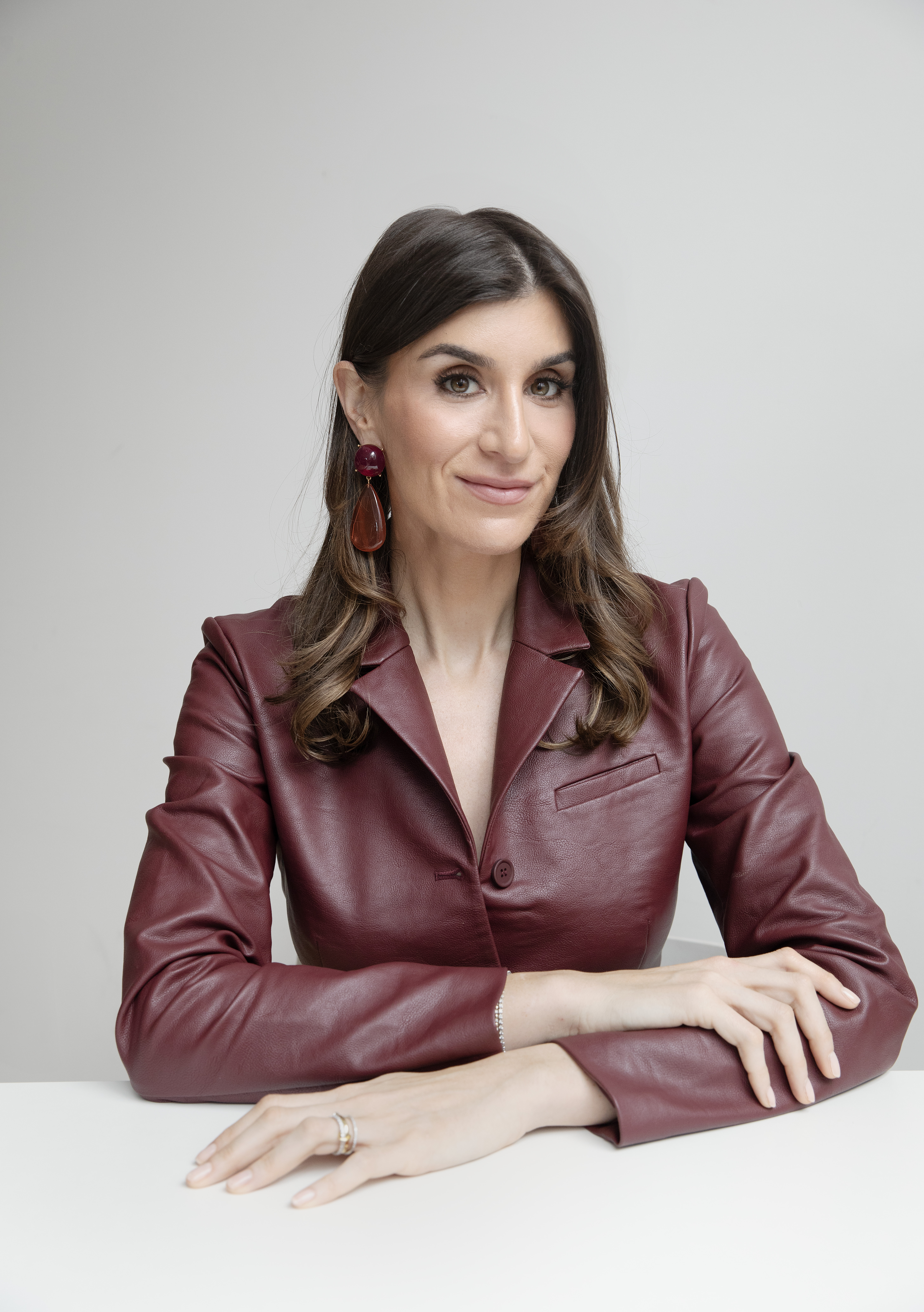
- Born: 1991 (age 34–35); New York City, U.S.
- Other name: MrsDowJones
- Education: Wesleyan University
- Occupation: Entrepreneur
- Title: Founder and CEO; Finance is Cool
- Awards: Fortune 40 under 40 (2022) and 40 under 40 in Media and Entertainment (2023); Money Changemaker (2023)
- Website: financeiscool.com

Haley Sacks (born 1991), also known as MrsDowJones, is an American entrepreneur. One of the first financial influencers, she is the founder and CEO of Finance is Cool, a media company and educational platform.

== Early life and education ==
Sacks was born in New York City and raised on the Upper East Side. Her mother was a social worker and her father worked at Goldman Sachs. She was bored and intimidated by the financial news that was front and center at home and instead followed celebrity news. She grew up surrounded by wealth but money was never discussed. She believed that finance was the domain of men and doubted her own ability to manage or grow it.

Sacks attended The Dalton School, Columbia Prep, and Wesleyan University, where she rowed varsity crew. A film major, as a student she made Vine videos that generated significant viral attention. She graduated with a degree in film studies in 2013.

== Career ==
=== 2013–2018: Late Night, Upright Citizens Brigade, Above Average Productions ===
Sacks returned to New York City following her graduation. She planned to pursue a career in comedy, and in addition to doing improv with the Upright Citizens Brigade, she was a page for the Late Show. Living month-to-month, with little money saved, she also worked the front desk at a fitness studio and nannied.

In 2017, she was hired as a producer for the digital content arm of Lorne Michaels’s production company, Above Average Productions. Struggling to make decisions about compensation and benefits, she realized she needed to understand money. To learn, in addition to reading books such as Warren Buffett's Ground Rules and The Intelligent Investor, she watched financial videos on YouTube. Created almost exclusively by men, she described the videos as boring, poorly made, and indecipherable due to the use of Wall Street jargon. She started to develop "zillennial finance expert" MrsDowJones based on her desire to learn and inability to find gender-neutral financial content that she found engaging and relatable.

=== 2018–present: MrsDowJones, MDJ Stimulus, Finance is Cool University ===
Sacks was laid off at Above Average in October 2018 and rather than look for another job in media, she decided to focus on MrsDowJones fulltime. Combining her background in comedy with her knowledge of pop and internet culture, the first MrsDowJones post appeared on Instagram in 2018. She also launched a financial clothing line and her website, Finance is Cool, in 2018. In 2019, a New York Times article titled "Smashing the Patriarchy with Memes" stated that she was helping to define the 'finfluencer' category. At the time, she had approximately 56000 followers.

In 2020, she launched MDJ Stimulus, a free eight-week program geared towards helping women and young adults financially navigate the coronavirus pandemic. She posted and blogged about pandemic-related issues such as the stimulus plan, furloughs, layoffs, salary cuts, and saving money during the quarantine. The last episode of the program focused on giving back; Sacks donated the profits from sales of MDJ merchandise to the New York City Covid-19 Emergency Relief Fund. She also appeared on Good Morning America and gave a TED talk at Georgetown University in 2020. In 2021 she offered a free financial counseling program, Moms are Cool, for mothers who were impacted by the pandemic, with Josh Brown and Angela Yee.

In 2021 Sacks introduced Finance is Cool University. Hosted on the Finance is Cool website, she launched the "Money 101" course Start Here in 2021 and "Let's Invest" in 2022.

Since launching MrsDowJones in 2018, Sacks has used celebrities, TV shows and memes to explain different financial concepts. As of February 2023, Sacks had more than 700,000 followers on Instagram, TikTok, and other social media platforms.

== Recognition ==
Sacks was named to the Fortune "40 Under 40" list in 2020 and the magazine's "40 Under 40 in Media and Entertainment" in 2023. She was named Creator of The Year (Personal Finance) by Adweek in 2022, and a Money Magazine Changemaker in 2023.

== Personal life ==
Sacks lives in New York City with her miniature poodle, Mystery. She is on the leadership committee of the JED Foundation, a mental health nonprofit for teens.
