= Stearns Lending =

American loan company (1989–2021)

Stearns Lending, LLC
- Type: Subsidiary
- Industry: Financial Services
- Founded: 1989
- Founder: Glenn Stearns
- Defunct: 2021
- Fate: Acquired by Guaranteed Rate
- Headquarters: Lewisville, Texas, U.S.
- Key people: David Schneider, CEO; Steve Smith, President & CFO
- Revenue: $521.7 million (2014)
- Number of employees: 1,700 (2015)
- Website: www.stearns.com

Stearns Lending, LLC was an American wholesale, retail, and correspondent lender. Founded in 1989, it grew until it became the fifth-largest privately held lender in the US in 2013. The company declared bankruptcy in 2019 and was acquired by Guaranteed Rate two years later.

== History ==
Glenn Stearns, who founded the company in 1989, was chief executive officer (CEO) until May 2012, when he named as his successor Brian Hale, former president and national production executive of MetLife Home Loans.

In May 2017, David Schneider joined Stearns Lending as CEO and a member of its board of managers.

Stearns appeared on the Inc. 5000 list of fastest-growing private companies in America in 2013, 2014, and 2015.In August 2015, Stearns' parent company, Stearns Holdings, LLC, was purchased by The Blackstone Group. In May 2016, the American Bankers Association added Stearns Lending to its list of endorsed lending services through the Corporation for American Banking.

=== 2019 bankruptcy ===
Stearns Lending performed poorly amid the rising interest rates of 2017 and 2018. In mid-2019, the company sought an agreement to restructure its debt with Pacific Investment Management Company (PIMCO), which owned 67% of the $183 million in senior secured notes owed by Stearns. The effort failed, and on July 9, 2019, Stearns Lending filed for Chapter 11 bankruptcy. On September 11, 2019, Stearns announced that it had reached an agreement with its largest noteholders under which the noteholders will support a plan of reorganization.

In 2021, Guaranteed Rate, a Chicago-based lender, bought Stearns for an undisclosed sum, which discontinued the Stearns brand a year later.
