= Daniels Recital Hall =

Historic church in Washington, United States

- First United Methodist Church
- U.S. National Register of Historic Places
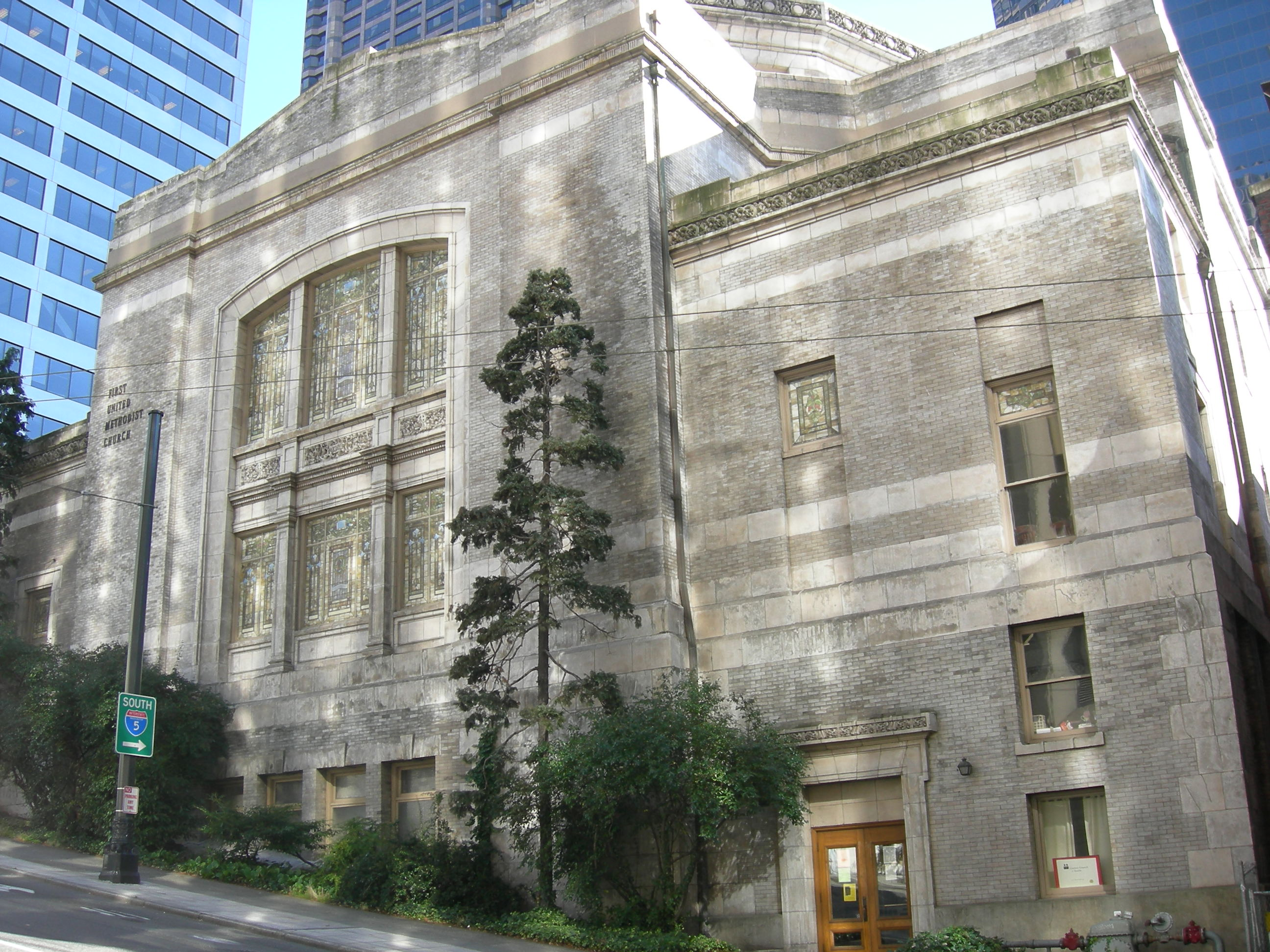
- First United Methodist Church (later Daniels Recital Hall), 2006

- Location within Downtown Seattle
- Location: 801 5th Ave., Seattle, Washington
- Coordinates: 47°36′20″N 122°19′53″W
- Built: 1908
- Architect: Schack and Huntington
- Architectural style: Beaux arts
- NRHP reference No.: 10001105
- Added to NRHP: January 3, 2011

Daniels Recital Hall, formerly the First United Methodist Church, now The Sanctuary, is a preserved church sanctuary that has been re-purposed into a recital hall. It was built in 1908 on the southwest corner of Fifth Avenue and Marion Street in Seattle, Washington, United States. The recital hall opened in 2009 hosting concerts that use the already existing church acoustics.

The hall is owned by Nitze-Stagen & Co. who saved it in a deal that was met with the First United Methodist Church. This deal brought an end to a nearly 25-year battle for the preservation of the site.

== Building ==
Built by the architects of firm Schack and Huntington, the structure is commonly placed into the Beaux arts style of architecture. This is important in that previously churches in the area had been built in what is commonly considered the Gothic Revival style of architecture. This shift is considered to be the result of a progressive change in order to reference the new age of the 20th century. The change is thought to be a representation of a new simpler time as shown with the simple, yet still elegant exterior terracotta reliefs, and the harmonious synchronization of how these pieces become a whole.

The building's base measures at 114 feet (35 m) by 165 feet (50 m) with a maximum height of 66 feet (20 m) from street level. The form is a centrally planned Bastille like structure modeled after classical churches such as the order of Saints Sergius and Bacchus in Constantinople. The rectangular base rises from the ground with a terracotta vine pattern relief cornice, which has since been removed. The façade is a large beige brick with a light cream colored terracotta trim. All four sides of the base have been extruded to create 4 alcoves. There lie fenestrations on three of the four sides of the base, with original elegant stained glass windows laid into each of the openings. In the final alcove the structure houses a full pipe organ, as well as a stage which was previously used as the church's altar. On top of the base lies a cylinder with stained glass windows that allows light into the interior shaft. Above that is a 64’ in diameter dome that is covered in red terracotta tile paneling.

The main room is a large auditorium. This space is 3 stories tall going from the floor to the top of the dome measures 66’ in height. The ground level houses enough seating for 1,224 people. The west alcove is where the altar lies. In the other three are the entrance to the east, and the stairs to the three upper galleries which house an additional 600 seats. The basement houses the footing for the primary columns which extend up 72’ from the base. This below grade basement houses rooms that were previously meant as a classroom, suit for the pastor, a parlor, a banquet hall, a kitchen, and a few small multi-purpose rooms.

The building includes "highly artistic stained glass windows" attributed to Povey Brothers Glass Company.

== History ==
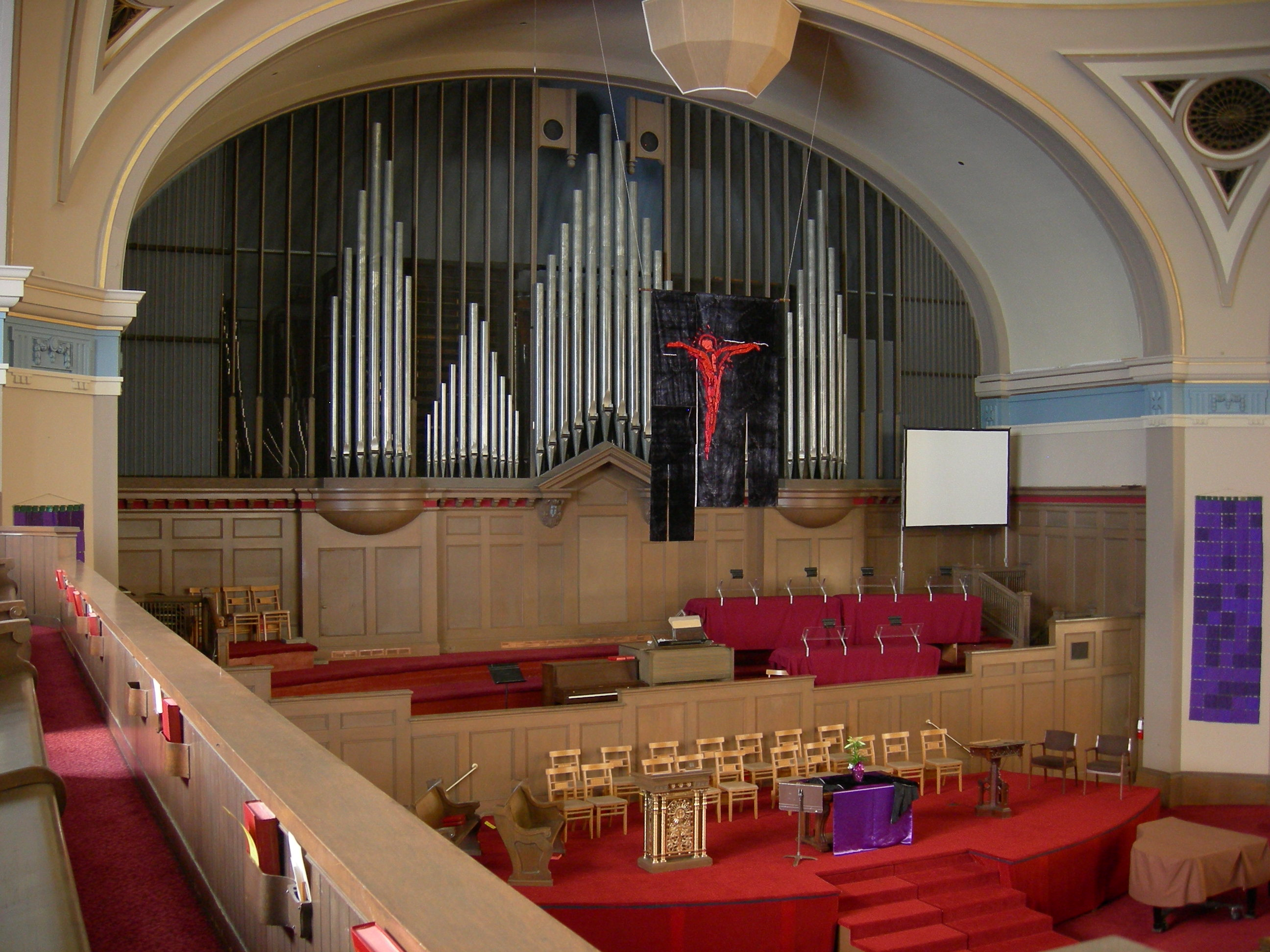
The organ, 2007

The early history of the structure was that the ground was broken, and the foundation stone laid in 1907. First Methodist Episcopal Church (the 1853 - 1939 name of the congregation now known as First United Methodist Church) had moved from an older church on 3rd Avenue and Marion Street when the building when it opened in 1908. In 1950 the church had the addition of an education wing added to the South side of the structure. This structure ranged from 2 to 4 stories in height. The addition was to accommodate the large need of the church for a space for community outreach and religious studies. Along with this addition to the education wing, the front entrance was also the tear down and reconstruction on the front stairs on 5th avenue was completed. Due to the new design a scheme, the main entrance is now entered from each side and the back of the main room. This eliminated the original sequence of movement from street to sanctuary, and created a wall along Fifth Avenue.

Then in 1984 there was a petition submitted to the National Register of Historic Places to put the site on the list. This motion failed due to the opposition of the church itself needing to gain enough money from the sale to relocate to a more convenient location. The church, city, and preservationists were in a battle until a deal was brought to the table, and agreed upon in 2007.

The church was eventually listed on the National Register on January 3, 2011.

The elaborate cornice of the sanctuary was removed in 1990. This removal of the cornice still affects the appearance of the building today.

The city approved plans put up by the Rainier Club for a skyscraper on the site in 2004. The plan met a great deal of resistance from preservationists. The church never reached a deal with the new development, as such the plan was never implemented.

In 2007 Daniels Development took over the land, and as the deal stated in 2008 the church education wing on the southern side of the sanctuary was torn down.

In 2009, Mark Andersen was appointed as Artist in Residence, and asked to provide a free noontime concert music series, with performances each month in the sanctuary. More than 57 noontime concerts were presented over 6 years, and many other evening concerts and events were also booked in the Hall. Many of these concerts were filmed and aired on the local television show Crescendo! by International Artists Records. The television program originally aired on SCANTV, and later on Seattle Community Media (SCM) at North Seattle College. Crescendo! also has aired across the country on Time Warner Cable. These concerts continued until December 2014, when preparation for reconstruction of the Recital Hall in 2015 began. The final concert before reconstruction was held December 16, 2014.

In 2012, Seattle-based Mars Hill Church leased the building and began holding services. In 2014 the congregation moved out of the building.

== Preservation ==
For 25 years preservation of the church was a contested issue between the city, the First United Methodist Church, preservationists, and developers. The first attempt to preserve the church was in 1984. At this time Larry Kreisman presented an application to the national historic registry to have the sanctuary placed on its list of historic places. After the city designated the sanctuary a landmark in 1985, First United won a state Supreme Court decision in 1996 that declared all religious buildings exempt from landmark status.

In 1990 the cornice was removed from the sanctuary. This was the first major change to the church itself in terms of preservation since the 1950 addition and remodel. The visual effects of this are still visible on the exterior of the church today.

Then in 2004, plans for a tower to be placed on the site gained city approval. This proposal met resistance from preservationists, as well as church officials, for its plan of tearing down the nearly 100-year-old structure. The plan was never implemented, though it led to the city asking the church about its intentions for what would happen to the land and the building. Although the church needed to sell the land to obtain the money necessary to relocate, they did not want the sanctuary itself to be torn down. Discussions continued between the church, the city, preservationists, and developers until 2007 when Kevin Daniels and his company Nitze-Stagen & Co., developed a deal.

This deal was approved by all parties. The plan was to tear down the education wing that was built in 1950. The developer would repurpose the sanctuary itself, and build an economically feasible tower in the empty space where the educational wing once stood. The church sanctuary has since been repurposed into a recital hall, and has housed concerts and other events since 2009. Demolition of the educational wing took place in 2008, and construction on the F5 Tower began in October 2014 and was completed in May 2017.

== In other media ==
In the Naughty Dog video game The Last of Us Part II, the exterior of the Daniels Recital Hall is recreated in a post-apocalyptic rendition of Seattle. In the game, however, the building is the location of a synagogue that the player can enter and explore.
