= Marvin Terban =

American writer of educational children's books

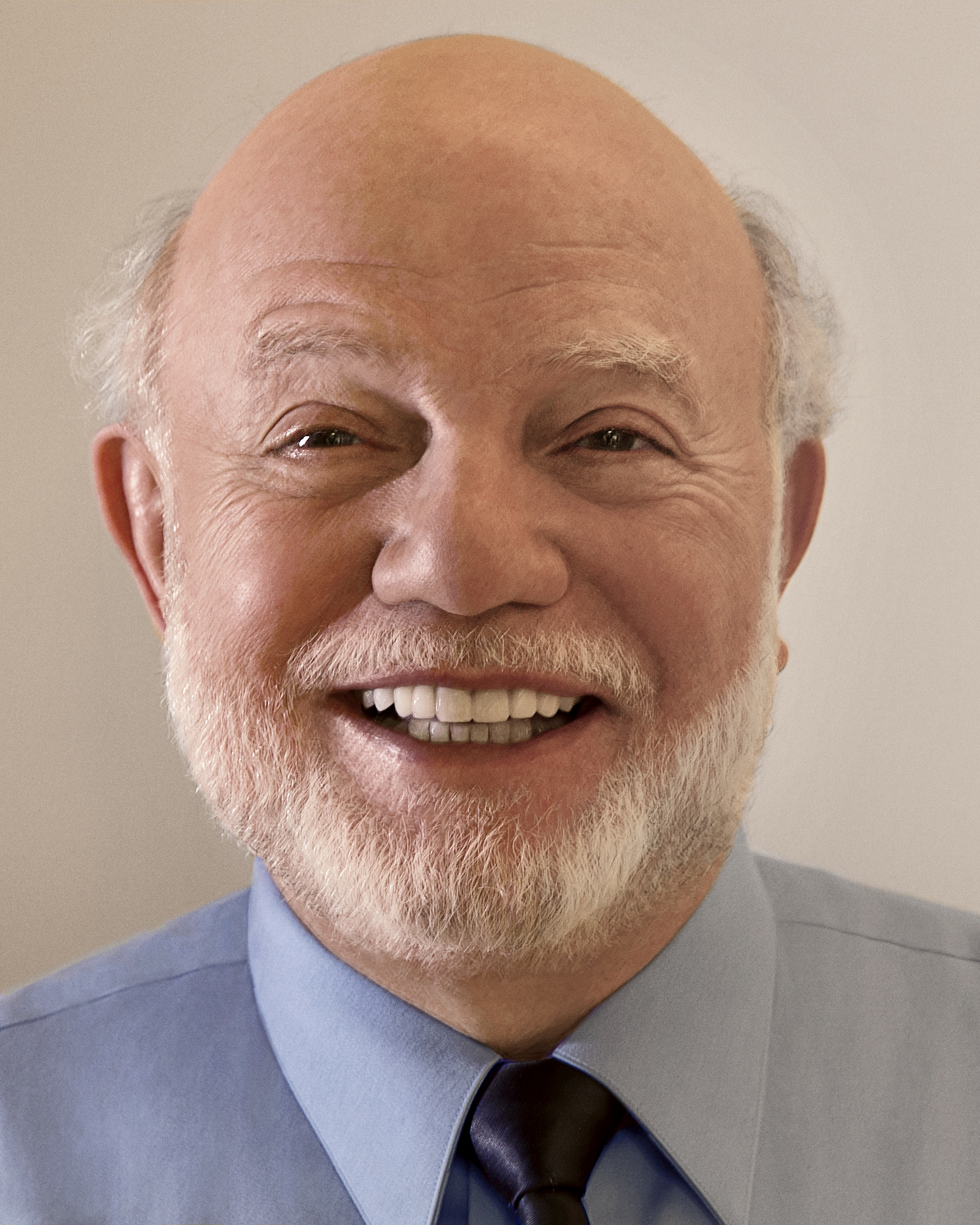
Marvin Terban in 2013

Marvin I. Terban (born 28 April 1940) is an American children's book author and a long-time educator. He has written 40 books for young readers, most of them about the English language. Terban has been teaching English, Latin, and other subjects at Columbia Grammar and Preparatory School in New York since 1963.

== Life and career ==
Terban was born in Chelsea, Massachusetts, and began his career as an author with a book that he wrote and drew in the first grade about a fuzzy green dragon. His teacher thought that it was so good that she put it on display in the local public library. To read it, his parents had to check it out of the library. His first real writing job was a weekly column for his local newspaper, The Chelsea Record, when he was in high school. He was also the editor of and a frequent contributor to his high school newspaper and literary magazine. In high school, he was voted "The Boy Most Likely to Succeed." He went to Tufts and Columbia Universities, where he received bachelor's and master's degrees respectively. For sixty-three years (1963-2025), he has taught English, Latin, Public Speaking, Computer, Theater, Filmmaking, and other subjects at the Columbia Grammar and Preparatory School (founded 1764) on the Upper West Side of Manhattan in New York City.

Early in his teaching career, Terban worked with schools in the tri-state NYC area that were using the first computers and instructional television in their classes. Returning to his own classroom with new skills, he developed teaching games that used humor to help students understand and enjoy the mystifying idiosyncrasies of the English language.

Terban's humorous books on language arts skills and wordplay are used in schools all over the United States and abroad. They are used in Shanghai University in China to teach English to adults. His Scholastic Dictionary of Idioms has been translated into Japanese, Korean, and Bulgarian. Two of his books were turned into early computer games by Houghton Mifflin. He and his wife Karen, a former special education instructor, also wrote two activity books for teachers. In 2005, the Society of Children's Book Writers and Illustrators named Terban their Member of the Year for his many contributions to the Society and children's literacy.

Terban has been called a "master of children's wordplay" by ALA Booklist and "Mr. English for Kids" by the Children's Book-of-the-Month Club. He is also Scholastic's Professor Grammar.

Terban has acted in local community theater plays to raise money for charitable causes.

Marvin and his wife live in New York City across from Central Park. They have two children.

Terban appeared as a guest on the game show, “What’s my line?” December 19, 1965. His occupation revealed that he was working as a department store Santa Claus at the Macy’s department store in New York City. It was also mentioned that he taught Latin and English the rest of the year.

== Books ==
- I Think I Thought: And Other Tricky Verbs (1984)
- Too Hot to Hoot: Funny Palindrome Riddles (1985)
- Your Foot's on My Feet: And Other Tricky Nouns (1986)
- Guppies in Tuxedos: Funny Eponyms (1988)
- Dove Dove: Funny Homograph Riddles (1988)
- Superdupers: Really Funny Real Words (1989)
- Punching the Clock: Funny Action Idioms (1990)
- Hey, Hay!: A Wagonful of Funny Homonym Riddles (1991)
- Funny You Should Ask: How to Make up Jokes and Riddles with Wordplay (1992)
- It Figures: Fun Figures of Speech (1993)
- Checking Your Grammar (1993)
- Time to Rhyme (1994)
- Scholastic Writer's Desk Reference (2001)
- Punctuation Power: Punctuation and How to Use It (2002)
- Kids' Guide to the English Language (2002)
- Building Your Vocabulary (2003)
- Verbs! Verbs! Verbs! (2003)
- Scholastic Dictionary of Idioms (2006)
- Scholastic Dictionary of Spelling (2006)
- Ready! Set! Research! Your Fast And Fun Guide To Writing Research Papers That Rock (2007)
- The Ultimate Spelling & Vocabulary Reference (2007)
- In a Pickle: And Other Funny Idioms (2007)
- Mad as a Wet Hen!: And Other Funny Idioms (2007)
- Eight Ate: A Feast of Homonym Riddles (2007)
- The Ultimate Homework Book (2008)
- Pocket Guide to Grammar (2010)
- "Marvin Terban's Guide to Grammar Parts of Speech" (2014)
- "Laugh It Up! The Funny Kids' Guide to Cracking Jokes" (2019)
- "Swap-A-Word" (2025)
