= Washington Street Public Boat Landing Facility =

Landmark in Seattle, Washington, U.S.

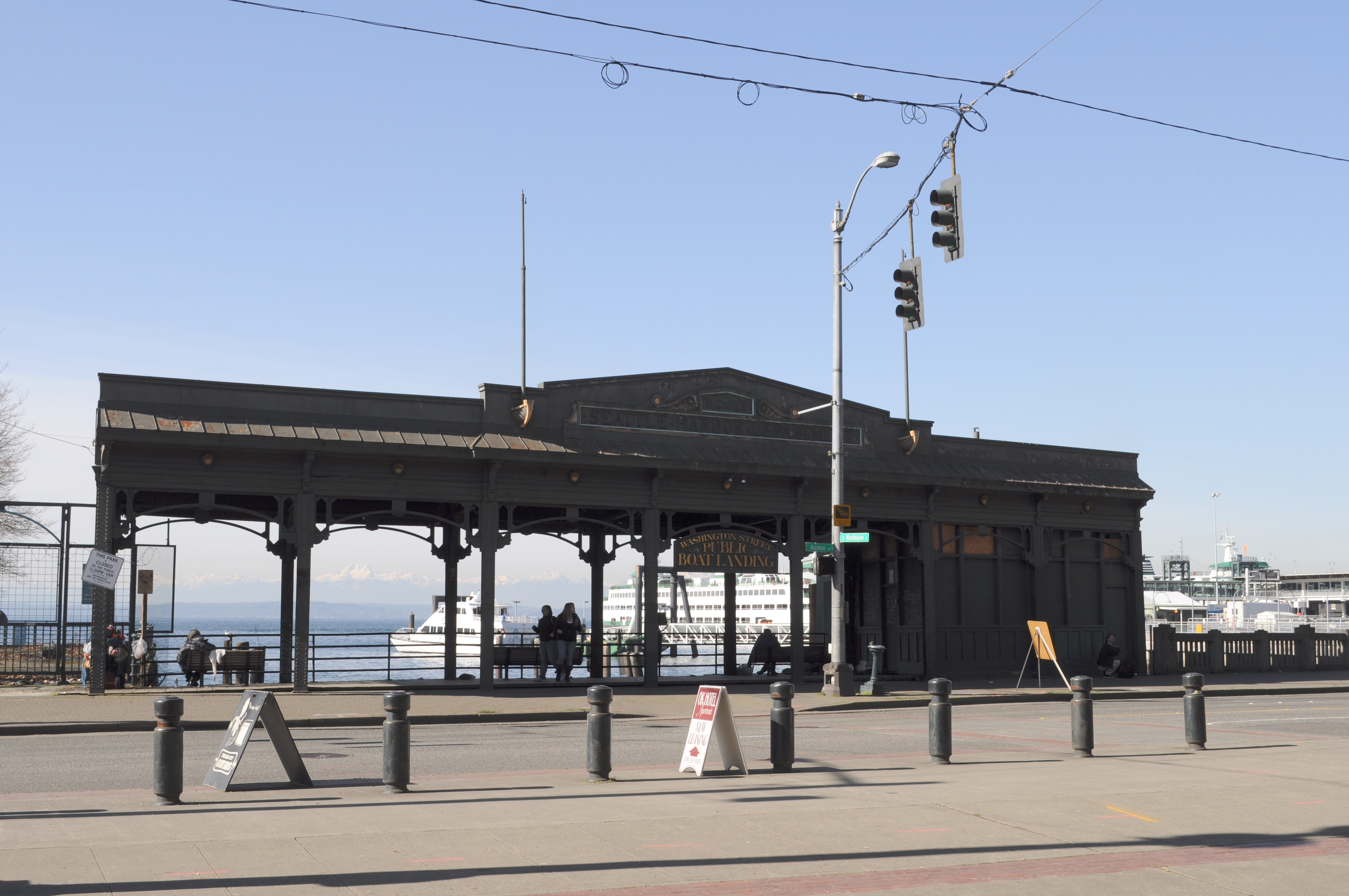
- The structure in 2010
- Interactive map of the Washington Street Public Boat Landing Facility area

General information
- Coordinates: 47°36′3.5″N 122°20′10.5″W

The Washington Street Public Boat Landing Facility (originally the Naval Shore Station) is a landmark in Seattle's Pioneer Square district, in the U.S. state of Washington.

Located south of the Washington State Ferry Terminal, the site features a pergola built for the Seattle Harbor Department in 1920. The structure is listed on the National Register of Historic Places.

In 2023, Molly Moon's Homemade Ice Cream announced plans to operate from the structure.

== See also ==
- National Register of Historic Places listings in Seattle
