= Molly Moon's Homemade Ice Cream =

Ice cream parlor based in Seattle, Washington, U.S.

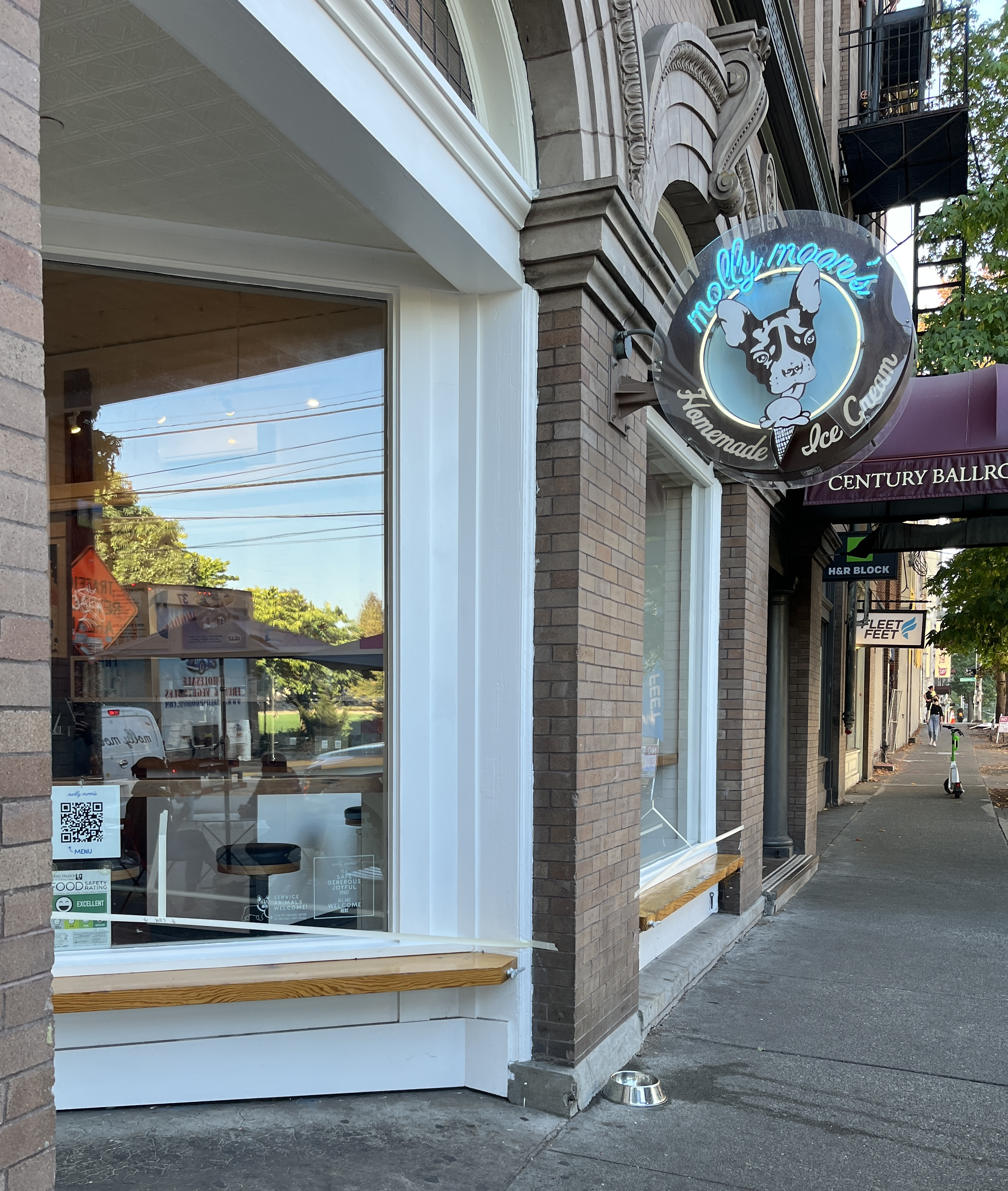
- Exterior of the Capitol Hill location, 2022

Restaurant information
- Established: 2008
- Owner: Molly Moon Neitzel
- Food type: Ice cream
- Location: Seattle, Washington, United States
- Other locations: Bellevue; Redmond; Edmonds
- Website: mollymoon.com

Molly Moon's Homemade Ice Cream is an ice cream parlor with multiple locations in the Seattle metropolitan area, in the U.S. state of Washington. The business was founded by chief executive officer Molly Moon Neitzel in 2008. Ice cream is made on-site in each of its shops, rather than in central commissaries, to avoid the possibility that ice cream will partially melt and refreeze during delivery.

== History and locations ==
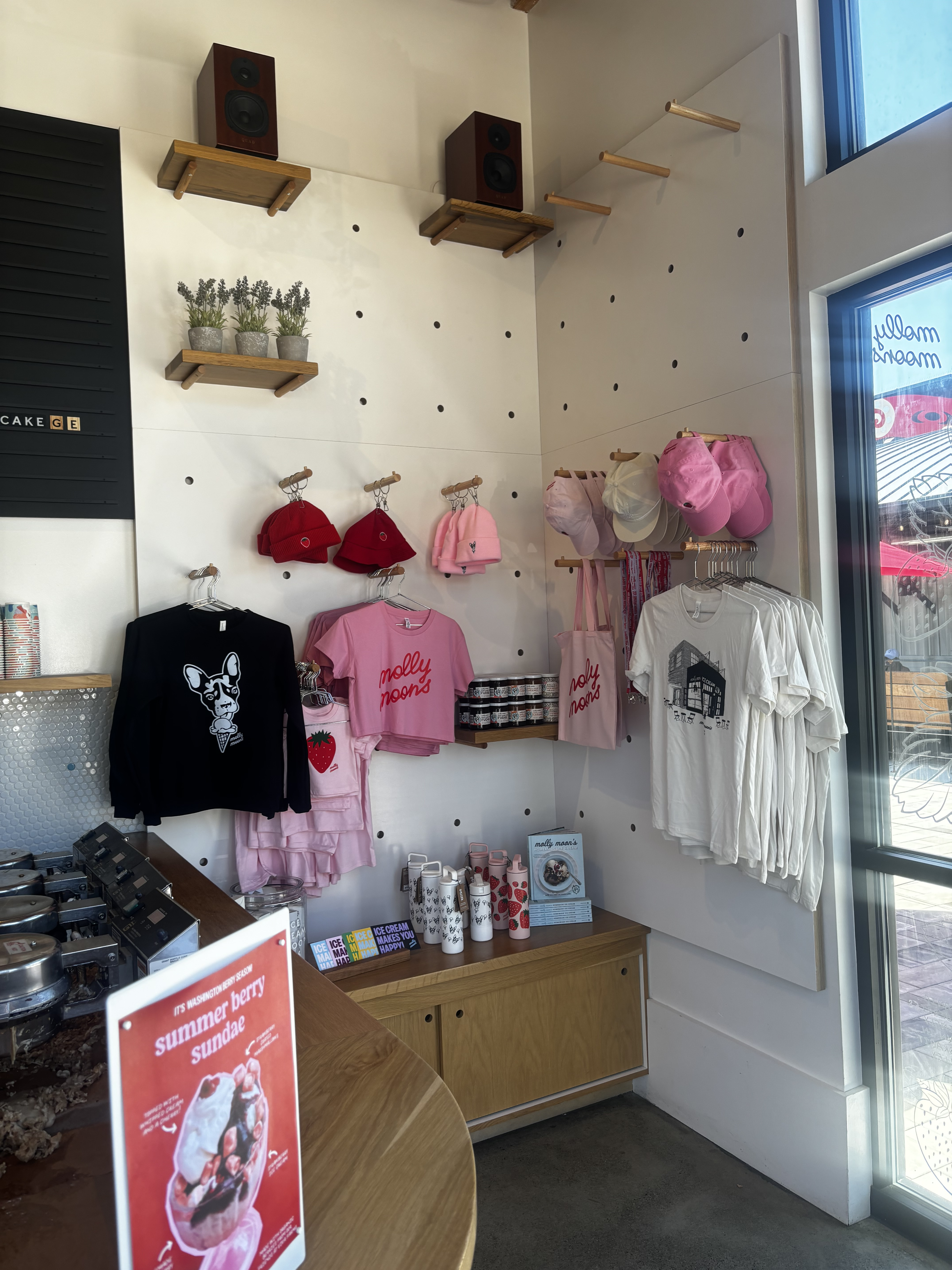
A corner inside the Molly Moon's location in Edmonds, Washington, to display and sell the chain's apparel, 2024

Molly Moon Neitzel opened the first ice cream shop in Wallingford in 2008. A location opened in the Madrona neighborhood in May 2011.

A fifth location opened in downtown Seattle in June. The Queen Anne location opened in September 2011. On opening day, the shop offered free ice cream scoops to children.

Molly Moon's built small parks outside shops in Wallingford and Madrona in 2014, as part of Seattle's pilot parklet program. In 2014, the company was sued for alleged improper disposal of dairy waste; tailors neighboring the Queen Anne location claimed that the waste pooled and rotted in the crawlspace under their shop, causing an overpowering smell that sickened one of the owners and forced them to stop taking some work.

A seventh shop opened in Redmond in 2016, and an eighth opened in Columbia City in 2017. Free scoops for children were offered for the opening of the Columbia City location. All shops offered free scoops to the first 100 customers for the company's tenth anniversary in 2018.

In 2020, following the removal of the Capitol Hill Occupied Protest, the Capitol Hill location attracted national news attention for posting a sign asking armed police officers not to enter the shop, including them under its "gun free zone" policy. In 2023, the business announced plans to operate in the Washington Street Public Boat Landing Facility, near the Colman Dock along the Waterfront. The chain opened its ninth location in downtown Edmonds in summer 2023.

== Reception ==
Eater Seattle included Molly Moon's in 2021 list of "Great Places to Get Ice Cream and Gelato in Seattle".

== See also ==
- List of ice cream parlor chains
- List of restaurant chains in the United States
