= Sharan Hegde =

Indian entrepreneur (born 1995)

- Born: 15 July 1995 (age 31); Mangalore, Karnataka, India
- Education: R. V. College of Engineering
- Occupations: Content creator; entrepreneur
- Known for: Co-founder of The 1% Club

Sharan Hegde (born 15 July 1995) is an Indian content creator and entrepreneur. He produces personal-finance content under the name Finance With Sharan and is the co-founder and chief executive officer of The 1% Club, a financial-education and financial-services business. He was included in the Forbes 30 Under 30 Asia list in 2023.

== Early life and education ==
Hegde was born in Mangalore, Karnataka. He studied mechanical engineering at R. V. College of Engineering in Bengaluru.

== Career ==
=== Content creation ===
After working at KPMG India and PwC, Hegde began publishing personal-finance content during the COVID-19 pandemic on YouTube and Instagram under the name Finance With Sharan. His content has combined personal-finance education with humour and references to popular culture. By July 2024, he had about six million followers across social-media platforms.

=== The 1% Club ===
Hegde and Raghav Gupta co-founded The 1% Club in 2022. The company initially operated as a paid membership platform offering financial-education courses and access to a community. It later expanded into financial-advisory and financial-technology services.

In October 2023, The 1% Club raised ₹10 crore in pre-Series A funding from the venture-capital firm Gruhas.

In July 2024, press coverage examined the relationship between Hegde's content businesses and his financial-advisory operation in the context of rules issued by the Securities and Exchange Board of India (SEBI).

In November 2024, the company reduced its workforce by approximately 15 per cent. Hegde attributed the cuts to hiring mistakes and efforts to reduce costs, including through artificial-intelligence tools.

In February 2025, Moneycontrol reported that The 1% Club's Personal CFO division was operating under a SEBI-registered investment-adviser licence.

== Published works ==
- Hegde, Sharan (2023). Zero to Viral: My Secrets to Going From Zero to Million Followers in a Year.
- Hegde, Sharan (2025). Rise to the 1%: The Smart Indian's Playbook for Wealth and Early Retirement.

== Recognition ==
In 2023, Forbes included Hegde in its 30 Under 30 Asia list in the Media, Marketing & Advertising category. He was also included in Forbes India's Top 100 Digital Stars list in 2022.
