= Salem Fields Cemetery =

Cemetery in Brooklyn, New York

Coordinates: 40°41′20″N 73°52′41″W

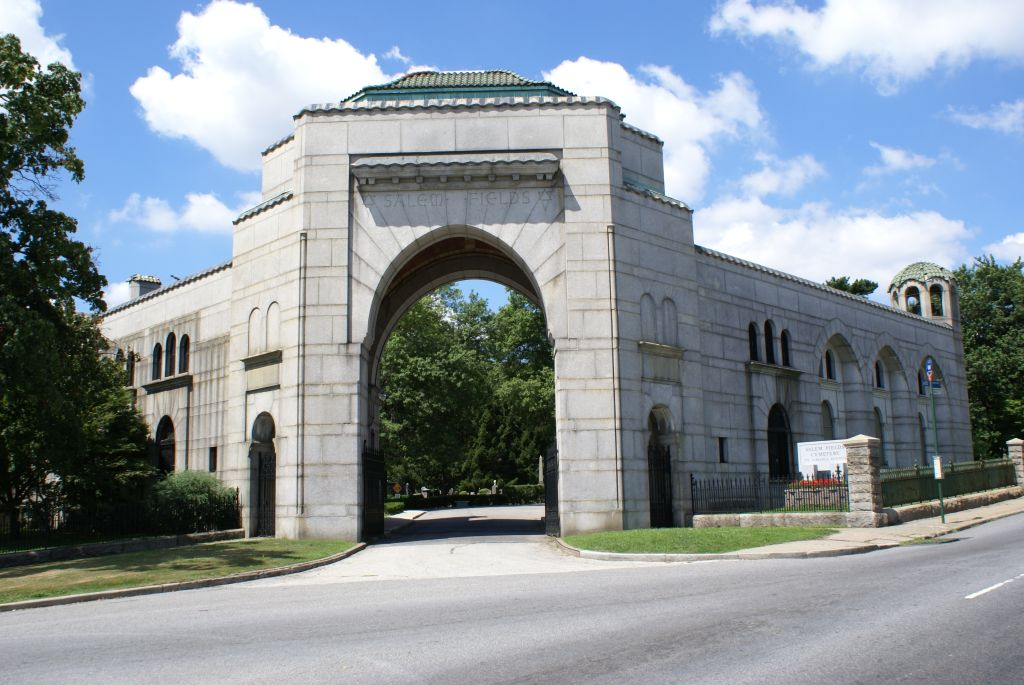
The main entrance to Salem Fields Cemetery

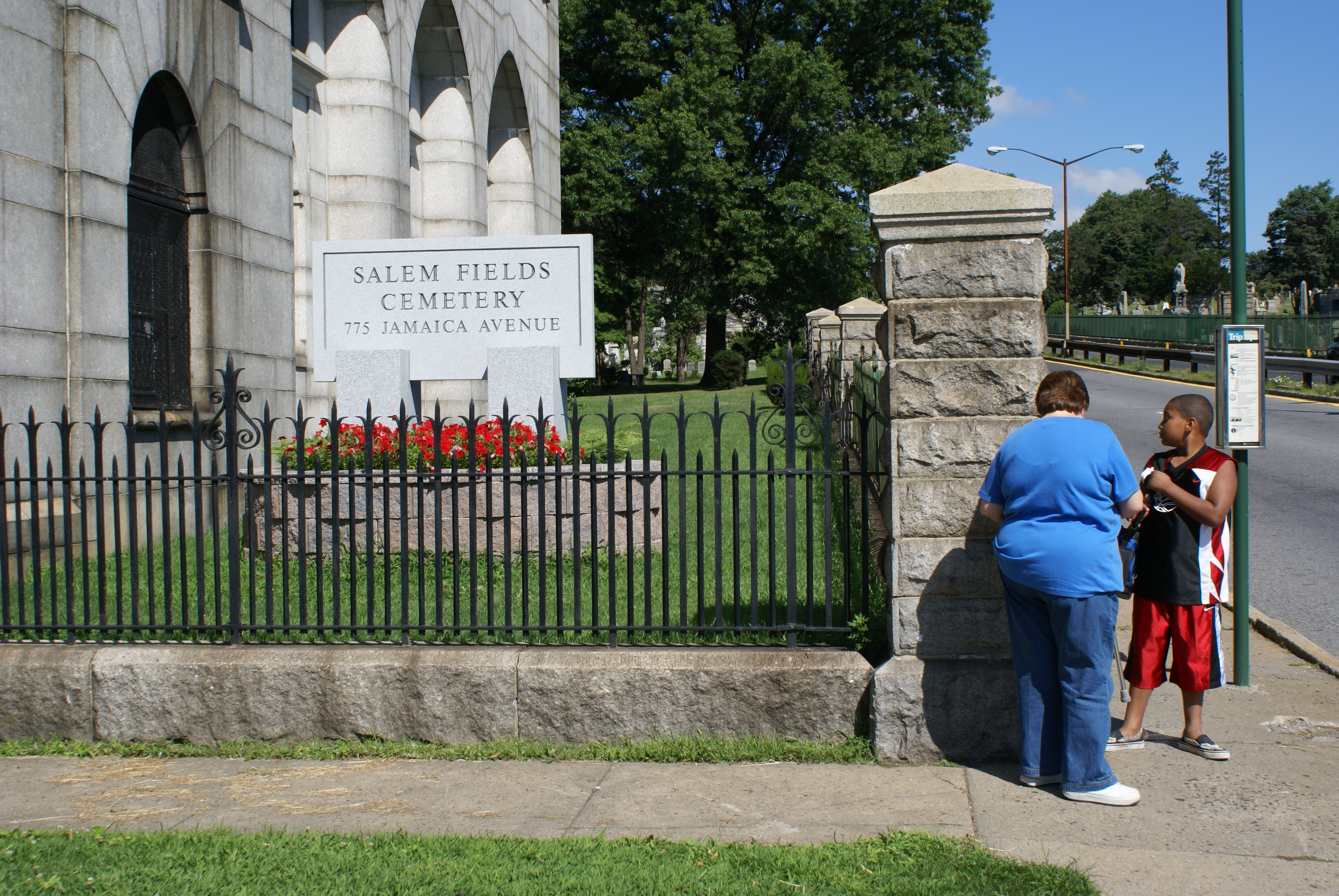
Sign flanking the entrance to Salem Fields Cemetery

Salem Fields Cemetery is a Jewish cemetery located at 775 Jamaica Avenue in the Cypress Hills neighborhood of Brooklyn, New York, United States, within the Cemetery Belt. It was founded in 1852 by Congregation Emanu-El of New York.

Salem Fields is the final resting place for many of the prominent German-Jewish families of New York City. Among those buried in the cemetery are members of the Fox family, founders of Fox Film; the Guggenheim family, who were involved in mining, newspapers, and Guggenheim museums; the Lewisohn family, who were involved in mining, banking, and philanthropy; and the Shubert family, which led a large theatrical empire.

Architectural historian Fredric Bedoire, Professor at the Royal University of Fine Arts in Stockholm, compared the "beautiful" Salem Fields to the architecturally notable mausoleums and undulating landscape of Père Lachaise Cemetery in Paris. Many mausoleum windows are made with Tiffany stained glass. Architect Henry Beaumont Herts designed the Guggenheim family mausoleum, modeled after the Tower of the Winds at Athens. The entrance of Salem Fields was designed by Henry Fernbach, the architect of Central Synagogue.

Salem Fields is part of a larger complex of cemeteries spanning into the borough of Queens, including likewise Jewish Machpelah Cemetery, where Harry Houdini is buried; Union Field Cemetery; Mount Judah Cemetery, where several prominent rabbis lie; Mount Carmel Cemetery; and the non-denominational Cypress Hills Cemetery and Cemetery of the Evergreens.

== Notable burials ==
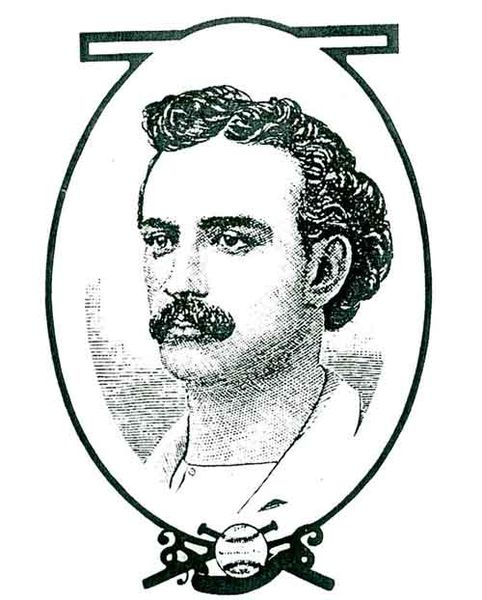
Lip Pike, first Jewish player in Major League Baseball

- Raphael Benjamin (1846–1906), British-born Australian and American rabbi
- Leo C. Dessar (1847–1924), lawyer, politician, and judge
- Abram J. Dittenhoefer (1836–1919), lawyer and judge
- Simon M. Ehrlich (1852–1895), lawyer and judge
- William Fox (producer) (1879–1952), founder of the Fox Film Corporation
- Marcus Goldman (1821–1904), investment banker
- Richard James Horatio Gottheil (1862–1936), founder of Zeta Beta Tau
- Joseph B. Greenhut (1843–1918), merchant
- Harry Frank Guggenheim (1890–1971), newspaper magnate
- Meyer Guggenheim (1820–1905), mining industrialist
- Solomon Robert Guggenheim (1861–1949), mining industrialist, philanthropist, art patron
- Louis H. Hahlo (1865–1932), lawyer, member of the New York State Assembly
- Sophia Flora Heilbron (1857–1944), pianist and child prodigy
- Ephraim Arnold Jacob (1845–1905), lawyer and judge
- George E. Jonas (1897–1978), businessman and philanthropist who founded Camp Rising Sun.
- Edgar J. Lauer (1871–1948), lawyer and judge
- David Leventritt (1845–1926), lawyer and judge
- Leo N. Levi (1856–1904), lawyer and Jewish activist
- Adolph Lewisohn (1849–1938), mining magnate, banker, art collector, philanthropist; younger brother of Leonard Lewisohn
- Leonard Lewisohn (1847–1902), mining magnate, banker, philanthropist; older brother of Adolph Lewisohn
- Bob Marshall (1901–1939), wilderness activist, forester, author
- Louis B. Marshall (1856–1929), constitutional lawyer, conservationist, Jewish leader, father of Bob Marshall
- Lipman Emanuel Pike (1845–1893), first Jewish player in Major League Baseball
- Adolph Moses Radin (1848–1909), rabbi
- Simon F. Rothschild (1861–1936), businessman
- Adolph L. Sanger (1842–1894), lawyer, President of the New York City Board of Aldermen
- Dorothy Schiff (1903–1989), owner and publisher, New York Post
- Joseph Seligman (1819–1880), banker, businessman
- Isaac Newton Seligman (1855–1917), banker, businessman
- Edgar Selwyn (1875–1944), playwright, theatrical director and producer
- Henry L. Sherman (1870–1938), lawyer and judge
- Jacob J. Shubert (1879–1963), theater owner and operator, director, producer
- Lee Shubert (1871–1953), theater owner and operator, producer
- Samuel S. Shubert (1878–1905), playwright, theater owner and operator, producer
- Jesse Seligman (1827–1894), banker
- Isaac Siegel (1880–1947), U.S. Congressman from New York
- Bernard Silverman (1838–1898), member of the New York State Assembly
- Alfred Steckler (1856–1929), lawyer and judge
- Sol M. Stroock (1873–1941), lawyer
- Julius Tishman (1864–1935), founder of Tishman Realty & Construction
- Felix M. Warburg (1871–1937), financier, philanthropist
- Albert Warner (1884–1967), co-founder of Warner Bros.

== See also ==
- List of cemeteries in the United States
