= Camp Rising Sun (New York) =

Student summer program in New York, US

Coordinates: 41.97483°N 73.83851°W

Camp Rising Sun is an international, full-scholarship, leadership summer program for students aged 14–16 founded by George E. Jonas and operated today by the Louis August Jonas Foundation (LAJF), a non-profit organization. Its seven-week program was operated from a boys' facility in Red Hook, New York, and a separate girls' facility in Clinton, New York, about 90 miles (140 km) north of New York City in the Hudson River Valley. Participants come from all over the world and are chosen by merit. Instead of being asked to pay for tuition, campers are requested to pass along the benefits they gained to someone else.

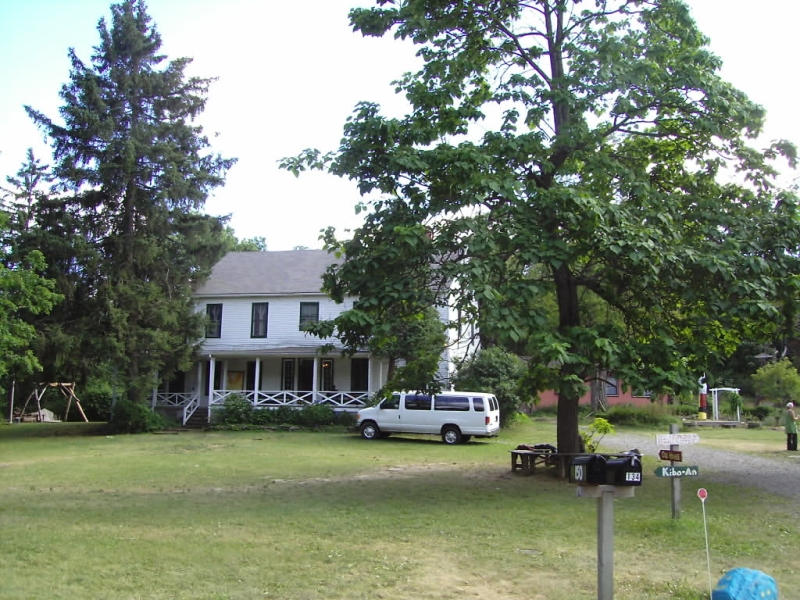
The Old House at Camp Rising Sun in Red Hook, New York

There are alumni organizations in numerous countries with more than 5,000 alumni around the world. Among the Camp Rising Sun alumni are a United Nations Under-Secretary General; a president of Harvard University; a winner of the Intel Science Talent Search; a Foreign Minister of South Korea; two former Israeli ambassadors; an Under Secretary of State in the Carter administration; and folk singer Pete Seeger.

In 1996, a group of Danish and other European alumni founded Camp Rising Sun Europe for young women. Organized and maintained by the George E. Jonas Foundation and the Camp Rising Sun Alumni Association of Denmark, the program was located in Stendis, Region Midtjylland, Denmark.

== Background ==
Camp Rising Sun (CRS) is Located on 176 acres (71 ha) in Upstate New York, including land once part of Livingston Manor. One of the longest continuously running summer programs in the United States, it was founded just after the stock market crash in 1929 by philanthropist George E. Jonas to "develop in promising young people from diverse backgrounds a lifelong commitment to sensitive and responsible leadership for the betterment of their communities and world."

Jonas grew up in privilege and wealth, but was troubled about the advantages he had in comparison with others. He reasoned that hope rested in the youth, and he began to consider what might encourage, stimulate and motivate them. He got the idea to start a camp, one that "is interested not merely in the boy, but in the man the boy will become." He set up a foundation, naming it after his father; the foundation runs the camp. For decades, Jonas personally interviewed many prospective campers, and he was called by his nickname, "Freddie."

After World War II, the program was expanded to include international youth. In 1947, the first two African American boys were invited to attend. In 1989, a girls' program was established. Jonas remained closely associated with the program until his death in 1978.

== Goals ==
The world desperately needs men of good will, men with vision, men who will not be daunted by heavy odds against them. With understanding adults outside the family circle, a boy can learn to stretch far.

— George E. Jonas, Founder

The Louis August Jonas Foundation's mission is to "develop in promising young people from diverse backgrounds a lifelong commitment to sensitive and responsible leadership for the betterment of their communities and world." Each camper gets the chance to be camp leader for one day. Prior to the 2018 Boys’ Session, the camper in charge for that day was called the sachem, a word that refers to an Algonquian chief. However, in 2018, the campers decided that this word was unjustly borrowed from Native American culture and ended the use of the term, replacing it with “Leader(s) of the Day”. Feedback, both from the staff and peers, is given.

The goal of the program is for participants to integrate what they learn at Camp Rising Sun into their lives and pass it along to others. After the two months, Jonas said, "We ask that the boys return to life, some day and in some way, the good they have received from it. So, we do ask a price, and its a rather high one."

== International community ==
The roughly 60 participants each year come from more than 30 countries. Most attend just once, but for continuity each season includes a handful of students invited back for a second summer. Campers from outside the United States had an opportunity to stay with an American family or with US campers or alumni as part of a hosting program before the camp season started.

The selection of participants is based on a candidate's potential leadership ability, intellect, character, and individuality. Camp alumni are generally responsible for selecting new campers from their countries, but in some cases, government officials, such as the Minister of Education or an ambassador, do the selecting.

After two months of exposure to many other nationalities, one camper after her summer at CRS stated, "It's not just Iran anymore. It's my friend, Sepideh, who lives in Iran," referring to her international issue.

Camp Rising Sun's reputation was built on the conviction that there is much to be learned through experience and interaction with those from other cultures and nations. Campers carry out landscaping projects to improve the camp, such as building a Finnish sauna or a Japanese rock garden.

== Camp activities ==
Jonas said, "Schools give you technical training, but they don't necessarily teach you how to think", and he set up his camp to supply that need. Campers work together in peer-led teams to take care of the daily maintenance needs of the camp. Counselors are required to be skilled in a variety of disciplines, from lifesaving to Japanese wrestling to filmmaking. There is instruction by staff, visiting alumni, guests, or other students on subjects like international affairs, microscopes, filmmaking, creative writing, and landscaping. Three weekly newspapers written by the campers document the progress of the camp.

There are evening artistic and intellectual programs, most often planned and executed by campers. At the end of July, there is a dramatic or musical production, involving the entire camp community. Each Saturday evening, there is a large campfire, at which campers discuss their different countries and cultures, explore global issues, and hear presentations, sometimes given by outside lecturers.

There is also time available each day for campers to pursue their own activities. Campers are encouraged to keep a journal and prepare other written material that is kept on file and sent to the camper on their twenty-first birthday.

A journal from 2006 describes a "fun-filled" day at camp:

After waking up at 8 a.m., I had breakfast, attended morning assembly, and worked in the kitchen during teamwork time. For project time, a few campers and I mapped out a plan for a garden that we hoped to plant on cabin hill. After lunch and rest hour, I went to an instruction called "Words Words Words" where a counselor Amy (Utah) and about seven campers practiced creative writing and poetry. During free time I went swimming with a bunch of other campers. It was Hester's (Netherlands) birthday, so dinner became a celebration. I received five letters, and since it's camp tradition, I had to sing to receive them. For the evening program we did Scottish dancing. It was a fun-filled day! After tent check at 10 p.m., I stayed awake and talked with Sepideh (Iran), Anissa (New York), Su Bin (Korea) and Annalisa (Utah), the hiking counselor.

== Finances ==
Because of the worldwide financial crisis that began in 2007, there was no camp program held in 2009 in the United States and the European program was cancelled for 2010. Since then, the two campuses in upstate New York have resumed summer programs.

On September 10, 2014, the LAJF Board outlined its need for a $10 million predicted increase in its endowment in order to meet current and future needs. The LAJF Board made available on the website a presentation from a summit in September 2014, which provided additional details.

On October 3, 2014, it was announced that, as part of its “New Dawn for Rising Sun” program, the board had unanimously voted to put up for sale both the Red Hook and Clinton campuses, and to begin the process of securing a new site for an undisclosed new program(s) in order to improve the fiscal health of the organization. In addition to the sale of the two campuses, the LAJF Board announced that the 2015 camp season would consist of two 4-week sessions each for the boys and girls, both of which were to take place at the Clinton campus. The LAJF Board also announced a new $4 million fundraising campaign.

This change in direction from the LAJF Board of Directors led some alumni to voice their concerns. Some alumni organized a group and began a petition, supported by over 400 alumni, seeking to have the current Board reconsider its planned actions and admit that alumni were not given ample opportunity to weigh in on this decision.

On October 20, 2014, the LAJF Board announced that the sale of the Red Hook campus was to be postponed for six months and that they would seek to be better engaged with CRS alumni, including providing for electronic Town Hall meetings and other increased communications on its New Dawn plan.

In mid-2015, after extensive meetings by the Board's Strategic Planning, Building & Grounds and Finance Committees, the LAJF Board agreed to consider the reopening of the Red Hook campus provided certain funds were raised by the alumni, $550,000 of which was needed to be raised by early September, to gain a "formal" commitment to do so. In record time, over 300 individual contributors responded to this call, and the Board declared the first hurdle for reopening Red Hook a success. Subsequent to this successful fundraiser, LAJF commissioned a survey of the Red Hook sewer system, which concluded that needed septic system repairs would far exceed the $550,000 raised by the alumni. Since 2015, Camp Rising Sun has run their summer program from the Clinton campus, alternating Boys and Girls sessions. Due to the COVID-19 pandemic, the camp went virtual for 2020 and 2021.

== CRS alumni ==
The LAJF Web site has a College Roster that connects young alumni with older alumni. Many alumni later spoke of their experiences at CRS, such as when writing their college essays. LAJF also supports a college scholarship program.

Alumni organizations for CRS alumni have been created internationally.

=== Notable alumni ===
- Clifford Alexander, Jr., 1947, former foreign affairs officer on the National Security Council and the first African American U.S. Secretary of the Army
- Darren Aronofsky, filmmaker
- Eli Attie, writer, television producer, former aide/speechwriter for Al Gore and Bill Clinton
- Norberto Barba, filmmaker
- David Botstein, biologist and recipient of the Albany Medical Center Prize and the Breakthrough Prize in Life Sciences
- Francis F. Chen, 1944, plasma physicist, pioneer of ultra-cold physics
- Samuel R. Delany, 1957, author, professor, literary critic, member of the Science Fiction and Fantasy Hall of Fame
- Dick Dolman, 1951, former president, Dutch parliament
- Sandi Simcha Dubowski, 1985 and 1986, filmmaker
- Richard Gibbs, 1959, doctor, co-founder of the San Francisco free clinic, dancer with Hamburg Ballet and the Royal Winnipeg Ballet
- Greg Giraldo, comedian
- Naomi Gleit, Vice President of Product Management for Social Good at Facebook
- Ulric Haynes, 1947, former U.S. ambassador to Algeria
- Juliane Henningsen, 2001, Greenlandic politician
- Anselm Hollo, 1950, Finnish writer
- Robin Janvrin, Baron Janvrin, 1962, private secretary to the Queen of the United Kingdom
- Robert Jastrow, chief of theoretical division of NASA; founder, Goddard Institute for Space Studies; author
- Ji Chaozhu, 1944, former Chinese ambassador to Britain, former Under-Secretary-General of the United Nations, author
- Ashok Kamte, Mumbai police commissioner killed in the November 2008 Mumbai terror attacks
- Kai Lee, program officer of science for the Conservation and Science Program of the Packard Foundation
- Sidney Lumet, filmmaker
- Michael Lunn, 1960, former Danish Minister of Justice, former Minister of Climate and Energy
- Joshua Muravchik, 1962, scholar, American Enterprise Institute; public policy analyst
- Matthew Nimetz, American diplomat and Under Secretary of State for Arms Control and International Security Affairs during the Jimmy Carter Administration
- Frank Ochberg, psychiatrist, expert in post-traumatic stress disorder
- Jeff Orlowski, 1999, 2000, 2002, 2006, documentary filmmaker
- Michael Pressman, 1964, television director and producer
- Itamar Rabinovich, 1959, former Israeli Ambassador to the United States; President of Tel Aviv University
- Neil Leon Rudenstine, president emeritus, Harvard University
- Pete Seeger, folk singer, songwriter
- Raymond Wagner, 1937, 1939, film producer, former head of television pilot development Universal Studios, former VP of Production MGM, former head of television commercials Young & Rubicam, New York and Hollywood
- James Yannatos, 1943, conductor, San Antonio Symphony; professor of music, Harvard University
- Michelle Ye, 1995, actress
- Zvi Zeitlin, 1935, concert violinist; Distinguished Professor of Music, Eastman School of Music, University of Rochester

== See also ==
- Democratic school
- Experiment in International Living
- Summer camp
