= Metropolis Gas Act 1860 =

Act of the Parliament of the United Kingdom

Metropolis Gas Act 1860 (Note: Section 1.)
- Act of Parliament
- Parliament of the United Kingdom
- Long title: An Act for better regulating the Supply of Gas to the Metropolis.
- Citation: 23 & 24 Vict. c. 125
- Territorial extent: United Kingdom

Dates
- Royal assent: 28 August 1860
- Commencement: 28 August 1860 (Note: The Acts of Parliament (Commencement) Act 1793.)
- Repealed: 16 June 1977
Other legislation
Amended by	City of London Gas Act 1868; Metropolis Gas Act 1861; Statute Law Revision Act 1875
Repealed by	Statute Law (Repeals) Act 1977

Status: Repealed

Text of statute as originally enacted

The Metropolis Gas Act 1860 (23 & 24 Vict. c. 125) was an act of the Parliament of the United Kingdom. The bill for the act was the Gas (Metropolis) Bill. The Metropolis Gas Act 1860 regulated the operation of gas supply companies in London.

As to the effect of the Gas Light and Coke Company's Act 1868 and the City of London Gas Act 1868 (31 & 32 Vict. c. cxxv) on the act, see Gas Light and Coke Company v Vestry of St George's.

== Background ==
The use of coal gas for illumination and heating had expanded since its invention in the early 18th century by William Murdoch, a Scottish engineer. By the middle of the nineteenth century there were nearly one thousand gas companies within Great Britain with thirteen in London. Increasing competition had led to falling dividends and by the 1850s the industry welcomed change.

== Provisions ==
Each company had a monopoly within its statutory area under the act. The act confirmed the districting company had taken up on their own initiative, as a consequence of the significant cost to supply gas.

The act set a legal minimum for gas companies to provide "16 candles" of light. Relevant gas companies were required to have dividends capped at 10% of revenue.

== Outcome ==
The act ended the severe competition and encroachment on rival companies' gas supply areas. It permitted companies to arrange for the monopoly lighting of allotted districts.

The act included the first attempt to produce a standard measure for energy supply when it defined the term candle power.

The monopoly status of the gas companies led to overcharging and abuse resulting in a public outcry. A select committee was formed to decide on the best response, and as a result the City of London Gas Act 1868 (31 & 32 Vict. c. cxxv) (quickly extended to cover the entire metropolitan area) tried to regularise this by forcing the remaining gas companies to open their accounts to public view.

== Subsequent developments ==
The whole act was repealed by section 1(1) of, and part VI of schedule 1 to, the Statute Law (Repeals) Act 1977, which came into force on 16 June 1977.

== Bibliography ==
- "The Metropolis Gas Act, 1860". Halsbury's Statutes of England. (The Complete Statutes of England). First Edition. Butterworth & Co (Publishers) Ltd. 1929. Volume 8: . Page 1240. See also Preliminary Note at page 1181 et seq.
- John Mounteney Lely. "Metropolis Gas Act, 1860". The Statutes of Practical Utility. (Chitty's Statutes). Fifth Edition. Sweet and Maxwell. Stevens and Sons. London. 1894. Volume 4. Title "Gas". Pages 47 to 61.
- William Newland Welsby and Edward Beavan. Chitty's Collection of Statutes with Notes Thereon. Third Edition. Henry Sweet. Stevens and Sons. London. 1865. Volume 2. Page 312.
- William Paterson (ed). "Gas (Metropolis) Act". The Practical Statutes of the Session 1860. John Crockford. Wellington Street, Strand, London. 1860. Pages 285 to 304.
- Edmund Humphrey Woolrych. "Appendix - Metropolis Gas Act, 1860". The Metropolis Local Management Acts, to which is added an Appendix containing other Statutes relating to the Powers and Duties of the Metropolitan Board of Works, Vestries and District Boards of the Metropolis. Second Edition. Shaw and Sons. Fetter Lane and Crane Court, London. 1880. Pages 405 to 421. See also pages 30, 63, 71 and 72.
- John Mews, assisted by Chapman, Sparham and Todd. "Gas and Gasworks". A Digest of the Reported Decisions of the Courts of Common Law, Bankruptcy, Probate, Admiralty, and Divorce . . . from 1756 to 1883 inclusive. H Sweet. Stevens and Sons. W Maxwell and Son. London. 1884. Volume 3. col 1976
- Ephraim Arnold Jacob. "Gas". An Analytical Digest of the Law and Practice of the Courts of Common Law, Divorce, Probate, Admiralty and Bankruptcy, and of the High Court of Justice and the Court of Appeal of England. George S Diossy. Broadway, New York. 1881. Volume 4. Page 5688.
- "Chartered Gas Light and Coke Company". London Metropolitan Archives. The National Archives. 1823–1894. pp. LMA/4438.
