= George E. Jonas =

American businessman (1897–1978)

George E. Jonas (December 22, 1897 – August 25, 1978) was an American businessman and philanthropist. He is the founder of the Louis August Jonas Foundation and Camp Rising Sun, a full scholarship, international summer camp in Red Hook, New York. Originally for boys aged 14–16, a girls' camp was added in 1989. After Jonas' retirement from business, he devoted the rest of his life to the camp.

== Biography ==
George Edward Jonas was the son of Louise and Louis August Jonas, who started an international business at the turn of the 20th century making felt for men's hats. The family was Jewish, and with business success became quite wealthy.

Jonas attended Columbia College, Columbia University, and was enrolled in the Naval Officers Training School there during World War I. His father died, and he left Columbia in 1919 before graduating. Denied position in his father's firm by the partners, Jonas was hired by a competitor whose plants were both in France and the United States. He became a partner in the Pellessier-Jonas-Rivet Manufacturing Company for many years. He later served in the Office of Strategic Services during World War II.

Growing up in privilege and wealth, Jonas was troubled by the advantages he had in comparison to others. Having pondered what he, as a lone individual, could do to help bring some stability and peace to the world, Jonas saw helping youth as the answer. At the age of 32, shortly before the stock market crash of 1929, Jonas bought a tract of land about 90 miles (140 km) north of New York City, in the Hudson River Valley in upstate New York. The 167-acre (0.68 km^{2}) property had a 200-year-old farmhouse (originally called "the Valley" and now the "Old House" at Camp Rising Sun) and barn that once belonged to the first Lord of Livingston Manor, Robert Livingston. and subsequently his grandson, Robert G. Livingston Jr. (1749–1791)

Jonas established a foundation in memory of his father, who died in 1915, to set up and administer and fund the camp, which was to be tuition-free. The foundation was located in nearby Rhinebeck.

== Camp Rising Sun opens ==
According to camp alumnus Pete Seeger, Jonas originally wanted to call the camp "Rising Son" and make a play on words. Jonas felt that for teenagers to rise in the world, they needed to be exposed to other types of people, so he intentionally invited boys of different backgrounds to his camp. Early on, campers were all from New York City, from a variety of religious backgrounds.

The camp was eventually named "Camp Rising Sun" and the first campers arrived the following summer, in 1930. The first group consisted of 17 boys, but in later years, the number grew to 60. Jonas interviewed potential campers, looking for disadvantaged boys who nonetheless showed promise. He became fondly known by all as "Freddie", though no one, including Jonas, could recall how the nickname became established.

Jonas continued in the family business till his retirement at the age of 57, at which point he began to devote himself full-time to the business of recruiting boys for the camp. His efforts took him all across the United States and around the world. When recruiting, he would tell boys that the camp was free, but they would be asked to later on pass along the benefits they gained from going to other people. Jonas settled on the qualifying ages for the camp because he felt that the period between ages 14 and 16 was crucial. A child was just coming out of childhood and did not yet possess a lot of prejudice, but had a lot of curiosity. Jonas said, "That's when a person begins trying consciously to shape his own life, to work out a purpose."

Other than Seeger, notable campers include Itamar Rabinovich, a former Israeli ambassador to the United States and president of Tel Aviv University; Neil Leon Rudenstine, President Emeritus, Harvard University; Richard Rabinowitz, American historian; Ji Chaozhu, translator for Mao Zedong and Zhou Enlai, Chinese ambassador to Britain, Under-Secretary-General of the United Nations; Naomi Gleit, senior director of product management at Facebook; Dutch politician Dick Dolman; and filmmaker Darren Aronofsky.

Jonas died in Rhinebeck on August 25, 1978, leaving his fortune to the foundation for continued operation of the camp. He is buried in the Salem Fields Cemetery in Brooklyn.

== Jonas' philosophy ==
I'm much more interested in the man he's going to be than in the boy himself.

The world desperately needs men of good will, men with vision, men who will not be daunted by heavy odds against them. My efforts are, of course, on a small scale but perhaps they can demonstrate what could be done with many camps or schools.

I'm trying to demonstrate that there are a great many young people who don't have much money or who have none, who are bright, and given encouragement and guidance will fill their potential.

I think everybody is reaching for happiness in life. Happiness in life can come from service to God or service to fellow man, or best of all, both. If you just spend all your life just trying to make money, you're not going to be very happy.

By the 1970s Jonas recruited boys from ~30 countries each year of diverse economic backgrounds. During two hours of daily "instruction" (ad hoc "classes" that ran for one day to two weeks daily) campers were encouraged to debate the entire gamut of political, economic, and social ideals. The United States was indeed exceptional, he espoused. Thus, campers from other nations lived with American host families prior to arriving at Camp Rising Sun and, prior to their departure home at the end of each summer, "Freddie" would bring all of the overseas campers to Washington, D.C., for several days to demonstrate to them the history and the uniqueness of the American experiment and the values of the American democratic republic, to which he hoped they would aspire in their home countries.

== Awards ==
Queen Juliana of the Netherlands presented Jonas with the Order of Orange-Nassau, the highest Dutch award bestowed on a citizen of a foreign nation.

In November 1977, the year before his death, Jonas was awarded the Alexander Hamilton Medal, the highest award given by Columbia University to a former student, member of the faculty, or distinguished college figure. Other recipients of the award include Lionel Trilling, Meyer Schapiro, Dwight D. Eisenhower, Richard Rodgers and Oscar Hammerstein.

== Legacy ==
In his lifetime, Jonas worked with over 2,000 boys from 37 countries. Even decades after attending former campers frequently celebrated how he and the camp had changed their lives.

The Camp Rising Sun Alumni Association of Denmark created a foundation to operate a European version of CRS and named its foundation after Jonas.
