= Abram J. Dittenhoefer =

American judge

Abraham Jesse Dittenhoefer
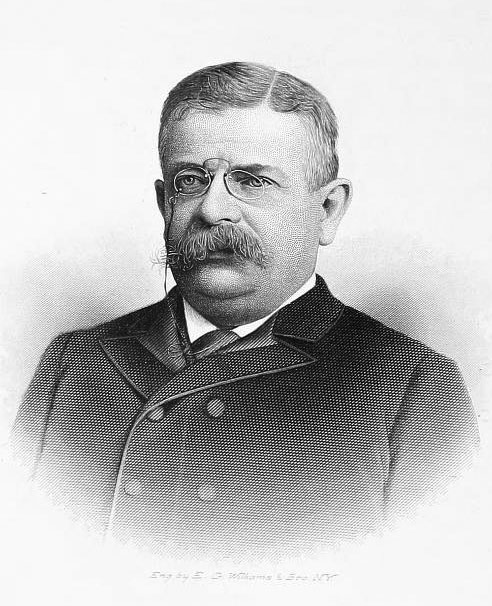
- Portrait from 1897
- Born: March 17, 1836; Charleston, South Carolina
- Died: February 23, 1919 (aged 82); New York, New York
- Occupations: Lawyer, judge
- Political party: Republican

Signature
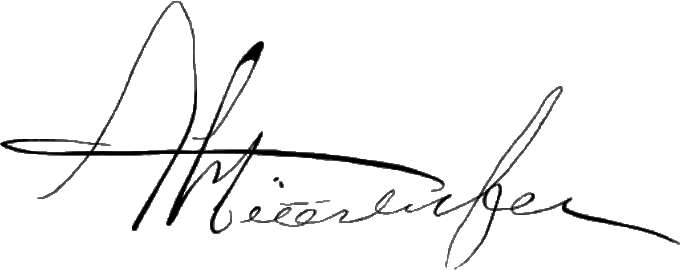

Abram Jesse Dittenhoefer (March 17, 1836 – February 23, 1919) was a Jewish-American lawyer and judge from New York.

== Life ==
=== Early life and education ===
Dittenhoefer was born on March 17, 1836, in Charleston, South Carolina, the son of German immigrants Isaac Dittenhoefer and Babette Englehart. In 1840, he moved with his parents to New York City, New York, where his father worked as a merchant.

Dittenhoefer attended local public schools the Columbia Grammar School and graduated from Columbia College in 1855. While there, he was distinguished for his proficiency in Latin and Greek, with Latin Professor Charles Anthon called him "Ultima Thule."

=== Career ===
After graduating he entered the law office of Benedict & Boardman, which John E. Parsons was the managing clerk of at the time. He was admitted to the bar when he was twenty-one. A year later, he was the unsuccessful Republican candidate for Justice of the Marine Court (later known as the City Court). Although his friends and family urged him to become a Democrat, he became a Republican due to his strong anti-slavery convictions. He served as chairman of the German Republican Central Committee of New York for twelve consecutive years. During the New York City draft riots, the rioters asked him to leave, although he refused to do so. He was a New York presidential elector in the 1864 presidential election for Abraham Lincoln. President Lincoln offered to nominate him a judge of the District Court of South Carolina, but he declined to continue his New York City law practice. He was a delegate the 1876 Republican National Convention, and for eight weeks stumped without compensation for Republican presidential candidate Rutherford B. Hayes for president in Ohio and Indiana. In 1862, Governor Reuben Fenton appointed him Judge of the City Court to fill a vacancy caused by the death of Judge Florence McCarthy. He donated his salary from the position to McCarthy's widow. He served as Judge on the City Court until 1864. In 1916, he wrote How We Elected Lincoln: Personal Recollections of Lincoln and Men of his Time.

Dittenhoefer was involved in all branches of the legal profession, although he was especially active in theatrical litigations and was considered an authority on laws related to drama and stage. One of his notable legal victories was in the "Mikado" litigation, where he succeeded on behalf of James C. Duff of the Standard Theatre in preventing an injunction for which Joseph H. Choate applied on behalf of Gilbert and Sullivan. He helped secure the repeal of a law that for twenty-five years gave license fees collected from New York City theaters to the Society for the Reformation of Juvenile Delinquents. A large portion of the fees were then donated to the Actors Guild, which he helped incorporate and aided with no compensation. In recognition of his service for the Actors Guild, he was presented with a testimonial and was elected an honorary member.

Dittenhoefer was counsel for the Lincoln National Bank, the Franklin National Bank, the Mercantile Credit Guarantee Company, and other institutions. The Board of Aldermen appointed him as a counsel when they were indicted for granting permits to encumber the streets with newspaper stands, and he managed to squash the indictment. He was counsel for Excise Commissioners Dr. Nerkle, Richard, and Mapelson when they were indicted for an infraction of the law, and he obtained their acquittal. He was also a leading counsel for Excise Commissioners Meakim, Fitzpatrick, and Koch when they were indicted, and after years of litigation he had their indictments dismissed on a motion he argued. He was counsel for newspaper correspondents, Elverton R. Chapman of the New York firm Moore & Schley, and others who were criminally prosecuted for refusing to answer questions put to them by a United States Senate committee that was investigating a sugar scandal. During the trial he established the principle that newspapers were protected from disclosing the source of confidential information.

One of Dittenhoefer's most notable cases involved the rights of an extradited American citizen. There was a controversy that lasted nearly fifty years between the United States and the United Kingdom over the right to try a person for a different crime than the one for which they were extradited, with the British insisting it could not be done while the Americans argued such a right existed. A case presented itself to settle the issue when a man named Rauscher was extradited for murder on the high seas but tried and convicted for cruel and unusual punishment of a seaman. Dittenhoefer defended Rauscher and argued the charge should be dismissed on the grounds he was not extradited for that offense. The court initially decided against the contention, but the case was ultimately appealed to the Supreme Court of the United States, who reversed the lower court's decision and ruled Rauscher could only be tried for the crime for which he was extradited.

Dittenhoefer served as counsel for the directors and captain of the General Slocum, Rosenthal & Company when they were prosecuted for their connection to a Japanese silk smuggling fraud, and the Metropolitan Opera House when Richard Wagner's widow Cosima Wagner unsuccessfully applied for an injunction to restrain the opera house from producing Parsifal. He was also a successful counsel in the matter of the application for a mandamus to compel the Consolidated Telegraph & Electric Subway Company, which was owned by the Consolidated Gas Company, to give space in its subway ducts for the distribution of electricity to the Long Acre Electric Light & Power Company. He secured the enactment of amendments to the United States Copyright Law and the New York State Penal Code that made it a misdemeanor to pirate plays. He was senior member of the law firm Dittenhoefer, Gerber & James, and one of his partners was his son Irving M.

=== Other activities and personal life ===
Dittenhoefer was a Master of his Freemason lodge and was appointed the state's Commissioner of Appeals by Grand Master J. Edward Simmons. He was a trustee of Temple Emanu-El and was a Reform Jew. In 1858, he married Sophie Englehart of Cleveland, Ohio. Their children were Irving Meade, Estelle, Belle (who married Theodore Richard Denzer), Edith (who married Leon Hirsch), and Blanche Rosalind (who married Percy William Darbyshire).

Dittenhoefer died at home from a cerebral hemorrhage on February 23, 1919. He was the last surviving presidential elector for Abraham Lincoln. He was buried in Salem Fields Cemetery.
