= Bernard Museum of Judaica =

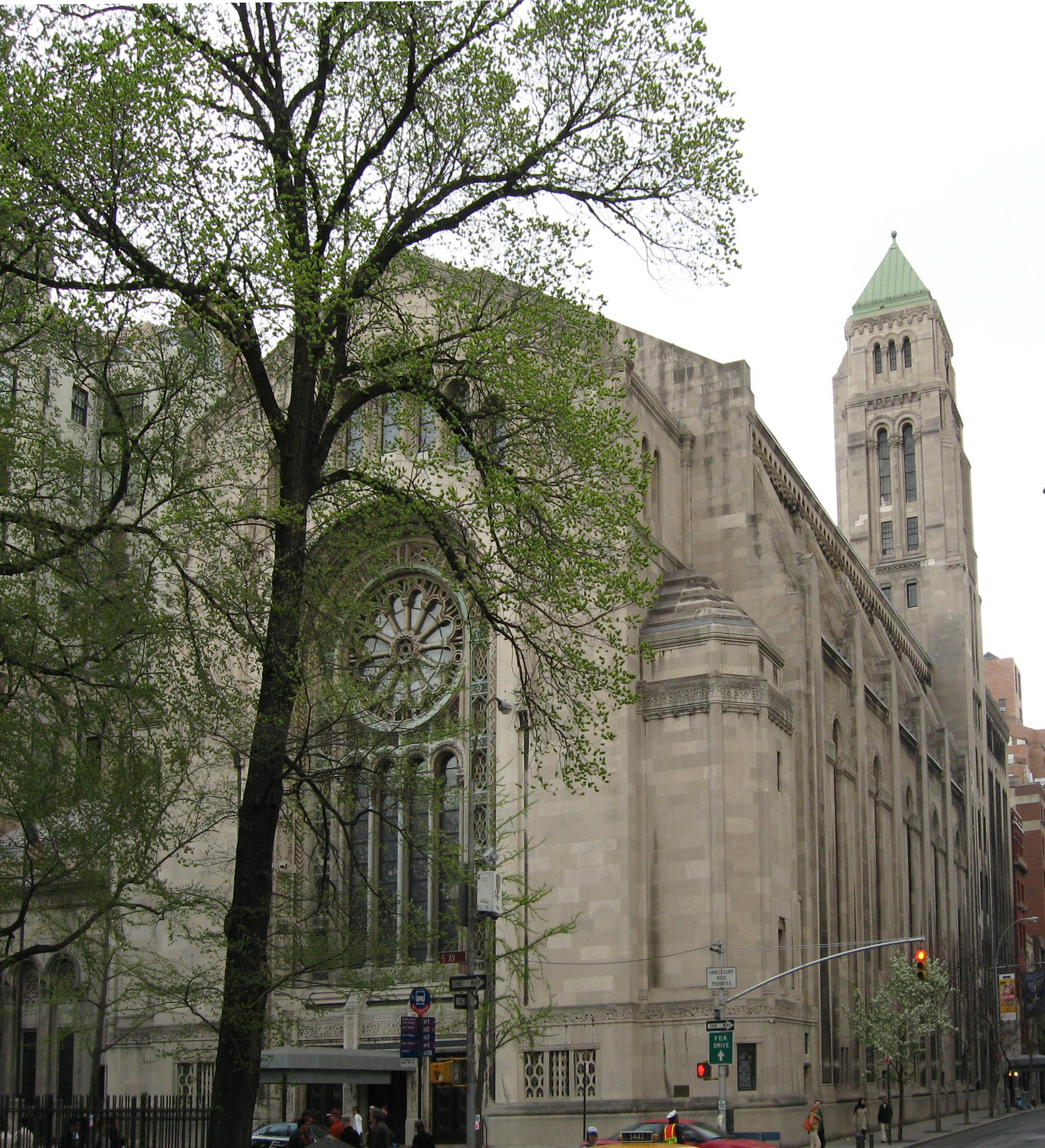
- The museum is located inside Temple Emanu-El

- Location within Manhattan Bernard Museum of Judaica (New York City) Bernard Museum of Judaica (New York) Bernard Museum of Judaica (the United States)
- Location: 1 E 65th St; New York, NY
- Coordinates: 40.767994°N 73.969656°W
- Type: Jewish museum
- Website: www.emanuelnyc.org/museum/

The Bernard Museum of Judaica, formally the Herbert & Eileen Bernard Museum of Judaica, is part of Temple Emanu-El on Manhattan's Upper East Side. Their museum hosts temporary exhibits on various aspects of Jewish life, faith, and culture.

The museum consists of three galleries which are housed in three relatively small rooms on the second floor. The first two galleries are often used for temporary exhibitions. The third gallery is the permanent collection which contains items of Judaica and Temple memorabilia. Some of the museum's more than 1,000 objects date back to the 14th century. Not limited to items from Emanu-El's history, the collection also includes items from the histories of Temple Emanu-El, Temple Beth-El (merged with Temple Emanu-El in 1927), Ansche Chesed and Adas Jeshurun who merged to form Beth-El in 1874.

Among the list of artifacts in the third room are a vast number of silver items, a large collection of menorahs, and pieces spanning a broad historical and global geographic range. Among the items is an 1891 silver, copper, and gilt torah case from Calcutta. Silversmiths in China made it for use by a congregation of Jewish ex-patriots from Baghdad.

Other objects and topics include:

- A contemporary maker illuminated books
- Information and descriptions of Jewish communities around the world
- Fashion
- Jewish marriage contracts (ketubot) as art objects
- A statue of Golda Meir that greets visitors at the entrance
- Descriptions and depictions of Jewish life in the early 1900s as reflected in old postcards
- Kabbalah
- Stereoscopic images of the Holy Land in the 19th century
