= Nick Salafsky =

American scientist (born 1965)

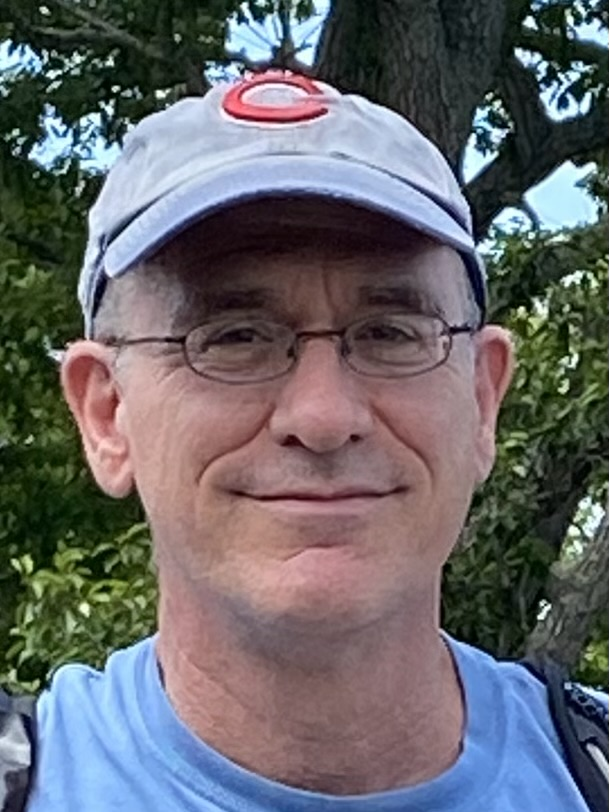
- Born: 1965 (age 60–61); Chicago, IL, U.S.
- Education: Harvard College (AB 1988); Duke University (PhD 1993)
- Scientific career
- Doctoral advisor: John Terborgh

Nick Salafsky (born 1965) is an American scientist known for his work in adaptive management and evidence-based conservation.

== Life ==
Salafsky was born in Chicago, Illinois. He graduated from Harvard College in 1988, where he participated in field research at the Cabang Panti Research Camp in Mount Palung National Park in West Kalimantan, Indonesia. He later earned a Ph.D. in Environmental Studies from Duke University. His doctoral research focused on the ecological and economic characteristics of locally developed land-use systems in West Kalimantan.

== Career ==
In 2000, Salafsky co-founded Foundations of Success, a non-profit organization involved in environmental conservation. His work with the organization has involved developing approaches for evaluating conservation outcomes and identifying principles for the implementation of conservation strategies.

Salafsky is also a co-author, with Richard Margoluis, of the book Measures of Success, which addresses the evaluation of conservation initiatives.

== Publications ==
- Salafsky, Nick; Margoluis, Richard (1998). Measures of Success. Island Press. ISBN 9781559636124.
- Salafsky, Nick; Margoluis, Richard (2021). Pathways to Success. Island Press. ISBN 9781642831368.
