= Adaptive management =

Adaptive environmental assessment and management (AEAM)

Adaptive management, also known as adaptive resource management or adaptive environmental assessment and management, is a structured, iterative process of robust decision making in the face of uncertainty, with an aim to reducing uncertainty over time via system monitoring. In this way, decision making simultaneously meets one or more resource management objectives and, either passively or actively, accrues information needed to improve future management. Adaptive management is a tool which should be used not only to change a system, but also to learn about the system. Because adaptive management is based on a learning process, it improves long-run management outcomes. The challenge in using the adaptive management approach lies in finding the correct balance between gaining knowledge to improve management in the future and achieving the best short-term outcome based on current knowledge. This approach has more recently been employed in implementing international development programs.

== Objectives ==
There are a number of scientific and social processes which are vital components of adaptive management, including:

- Management is linked to appropriate temporal and spatial scales
- Management retains a focus on statistical power and controls
- Use of computer models to build synthesis and an embodied ecological consensus
- Use of embodied ecological consensus to evaluate strategic alternatives
- Communication of alternatives to political arena for negotiation of a selection

The achievement of these objectives requires an open management process which seeks to include past, present and future stakeholders. Adaptive management needs to at least maintain political openness, but usually aims to create it. Adaptive management must therefore be a scientific and social process. It must focus on the development of new institutions and institutional strategies in balance with scientific hypothesis and experimental frameworks (resilience.org).

Adaptive management can proceed as either passive or active adaptive management, depending on how learning takes place. Passive adaptive management values learning only insofar as it improves decision outcomes (i.e. passively), as measured by the specified utility function. In contrast, active adaptive management explicitly incorporates learning as part of the objective function, and hence, decisions which improve learning are valued over those which do not. In both cases, as new knowledge is gained, the models are updated and optimal management strategies are derived accordingly. Thus, while learning occurs in both cases, it is treated differently. Often, deriving actively adaptive policies is technically very difficult, which prevents it being more commonly applied.

== Features ==
Key features of both passive and active adaptive management are:

- Iterative decision-making (evaluating results and adjusting actions on the basis of what has been learned)
- Feedback between monitoring and decisions (learning)
- Explicit characterization of system uncertainty through multi-model inference
- Bayesian inference
- Embracing risk and uncertainty as a way of building understanding

However, a number of process failures related to information feedback can prevent effective adaptive management decision making:

- data collection is never completely implemented
- data are collected but not analyzed
- data are analyzed but results are inconclusive
- data are analyzed and are interesting, but are not presented to decision makers
- data are analyzed and presented, but are not used for decision-making because of internal or external factors

== History ==
The use of adaptive management techniques can be traced back to peoples from ancient civilisations. For example, the Yap people of Micronesia have been using adaptive management techniques to sustain high population densities in the face of resource scarcity for thousands of years (Falanruw 1984). In using these techniques, the Yap people have altered their environment creating, for example, coastal mangrove depressions and seagrass meadows to support fishing and termite resistant wood (Stankey and Shinder 1997).

The origin of the adaptive management concept can be traced back to ideas of scientific management pioneered by Frederick Taylor in the early 1900s (Haber 1964). While the term "adaptive management" evolved in natural resource management workshops through decision makers, managers and scientists focussing on building simulation models to uncover key assumptions and uncertainties.

Two ecologists at The University of British Columbia, C.S. Holling and C.J Walters further developed the adaptive management approach as they distinguished between passive and active adaptive management practice. Kai Lee, notable Princeton physicist, expanded upon the approach in the late 1970s and early 1980s while pursuing a post-doctorate degree at UC Berkeley. The approach was further developed at the International Institute for Applied Systems Analysis (IIASA) in Vienna, Austria, while C.S. Holling was director of the institute. In 1992, Hilbourne described three learning models for federal land managers, around which adaptive management approaches could be developed, these are reactive, passive and active.

Adaptive management has probably been most frequently applied in Yap, Australia and North America, initially applied in fishery management, but received more broad application in the 1990s and 2000s. One of the most successful applications of adaptive management has been in the area of waterfowl harvest management in North America, most notably for the mallard.

Adaptive management in a conservation project and program context can trace its roots back to at least the early 1990s, with the establishment of the Biodiversity Support Program (BSP) in 1989. BSP was a USAID-funded consortium of WWF, The Nature Conservancy (TNC), and World Resources Institute (WRI). Its Analysis and Adaptive Management Program sought to understand the conditions under which certain conservation strategies were most effective and to identify lessons learned across conservation projects. When BSP ended in 2001, TNC and Foundations of Success (FOS, a non-profit which grew out of BSP) continued to actively work in promoting adaptive management for conservation projects and programs. The approaches used included Conservation by Design (TNC) and Measures of Success (FOS).

In 2004, the Conservation Measures Partnership (CMP) – which includes several former BSP members – developed a common set of standards and guidelines for applying adaptive management to conservation projects and programs.

== Use in environmental practices ==
Applying adaptive management in a conservation or ecosystem management project involves the integration of project/program design, management, and monitoring to systematically test assumptions in order to adapt and learn. The three components of adaptive management in environmental practice are:

- Testing assumptions is about systematically trying different actions to achieve a desired outcome. It is not, however, a random trial-and-error process. Rather, it involves using knowledge about the specific site to pick the best known strategy, laying out the assumptions behind how that strategy will work, and then collecting monitoring data to determine if the assumptions hold true.
- Adaptation involves changing assumptions and interventions to respond to new or different information obtained through monitoring and project experience.
- Learning is about explicitly documenting a team's planning and implementation processes and its successes and failures for internal learning as well as learning across the conservation community. This learning enables conservation practitioners to design and manage projects better and avoid some of the perils others have encountered. Learning about a managed system is only useful in cases where management decisions are repeated.

== Application to environmental projects and programs ==
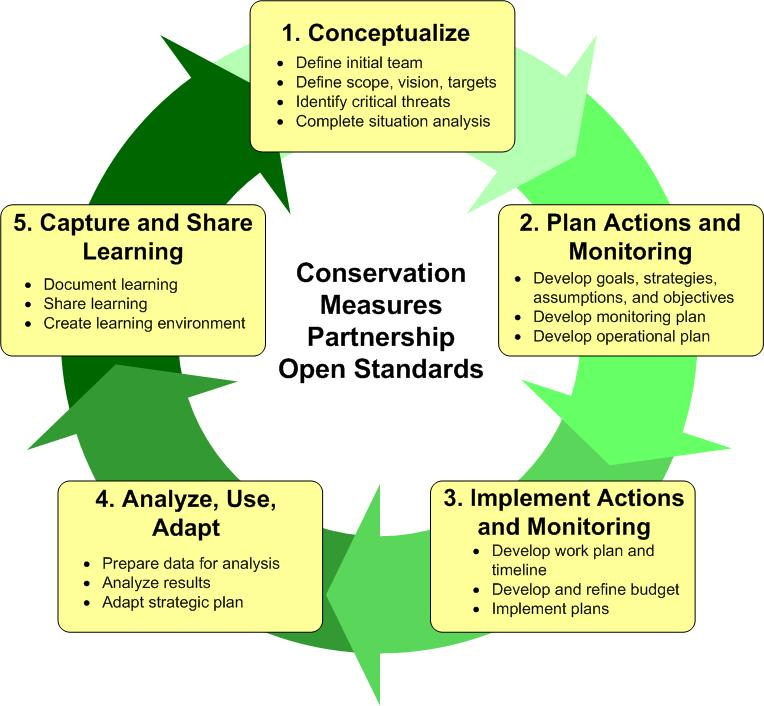
Figure 1: CMP Adaptive Management Cycle

Open Standards for the Practice of Conservation lays out five main steps to an adaptive management project cycle (see Figure 1). The Open Standards represent a compilation and adaptation of best practices and guidelines across several fields and across several organizations within the conservation community. Since the release of the initial Open Standards (updated to version 5.0 in 2025), thousands of project teams from conservation organizations (e.g., TNC, Rare, and WWF), local conservation groups, and donors alike have begun applying these Open Standards to their work. In addition, several CMP members have developed training materials and courses to help apply the Standards.

Some recent write-ups of adaptive management in conservation include wildlife protection (SWAP, 2008), forests ecosystem protection (CMER, 2010), coastal protection and restoration (LACPR, 2009), natural resource management (water, land and soil), species conservation especially, fish conservation from overfishing (FOS, 2007) and climate change (DFG, 2010). In addition, some other examples follow:

- In 2006–2007, FOS worked with The National Fish and Wildlife Foundation (NFWF) to develop an evaluation system help NFWF gauge impact across the various coral reef habitat and species conservation projects;
- In 2007, FOS worked with the Ocean Conservancy (OC) to evaluate the effectiveness of this Scorecard in helping to end overfishing in domestic fisheries.
- Between 1999 and 2004, FOS worked for WWF's Asian Rhino and Elephant Action Strategy (AREAS) Program to ensure that Asian elephants and rhinos thrive in secure habitats within their historical range and in harmony with people.
- The Department of Fish and Game (DFG) is developing and implementing adaptation strategies to help protect, restore and manage fish and wildlife, with the understanding that some level of climate change will occur and that it will have profound effects on ecosystems in the United States.
- The Adaptive Management program was created by CMR to provide science-based recommendations and technical information to assist the Forest Practices Board. In April 2010, the Forest Practices Adaptive Management Annual Science Conference was held in Washington.
- In 2009, The Louisiana Coastal Protection and Restoration (LACPR) Technical Report has been developed by the United States Army Corps of Engineers (USACE) according to adaptive management process.
- Since 2009, the Kenya Wildlife Service has been managing its marine protected areas using adaptive management in an ongoing process of learning through the Science for Active Management (SAM) Program.

== In international development ==
The concept of adaptive management is not restricted to natural resources or ecosystem management, as similar concepts have been applied to international development programming. This has often been a recognition to the "wicked" nature of many development challenges and the limits of traditional planning processes. One of the principal changes facing international development organizations is the need to be more flexible, adaptable and focused on learning. This is reflected in international development approaches such as Doing Development Differently, Politically Informed Programming and Problem Driven Iterative Adaptation.

One recent example of the use of adaptive management by international development donors is the planned Global Learning for Adaptive Management (GLAM) programme to support adaptive management in Department for International Development and USAID. The program is establishing a centre for learning about adaptive management to support the utilization and accessibility of adaptive management. In addition, donors have been focused on amending their own programmatic guidance to reflect the importance of learning within programs: for instance, USAID's recent focus in their ADS guidance on the importance of collaborating, learning and adapting. This is also reflected in Department for International Development's Smart Rules that provide the operating framework for their programs including the use of evidence to inform their decisions. There are a variety of tools used to operationalize adaptive management in programs, such as learning agendas and decision cycles.

Collaborating, learning and adapting (CLA) is a concept related to the operationalizing of adaptive management in international development that describes a specific way of designing, implementing, adapting and evaluating programs. CLA involves three concepts:

1. collaborating intentionally with stakeholders to share knowledge and reduce duplication of effort,
2. learning systematically by drawing on evidence from a variety of sources and taking the time to reflect on implementation, and
3. adapting strategically based on applied learning. CLA practices have tangible benefits; for instance, a recent study recently found that companies "which apply more data-driven and adaptive leadership practices perform better" when examined against those which focus less on those practices.

CLA integrates three closely connected concepts within the organizational theory literature: namely collaborating, learning and adapting. There is evidence of the benefits of collaborating internally within an organization and externally with organizations. Much of the production and transmission of knowledge—both explicit knowledge and tacit knowledge—occurs through collaboration. There is evidence for the importance of collaboration among individuals and groups for innovation, knowledge production, and diffusion—for example, the benefits of staff interacting with one another and transmitting knowledge. The importance of collaboration is closely linked to the ability of organizations to collectively learn from each other, a concept noted in the literature on learning organizations.

CLA, an adaptive management practice, is being employed by implementing partners that receive funding from the federal government of the United States, but it is primarily a framework for internal change efforts that aim at incorporating collaboration, learning, and adaptation within the United States Agency for International Development (USAID) including its missions located around the world. CLA has been linked to a part of USAID's commitment to becoming a learning organization. CLA represents an approach to combine strategic collaboration, continuous learning, and adaptive management. A part of integrating the CLA approach is providing tools and resources, such as the Learning Lab, to staff and partner organizations. The CLA approach is detailed for USAID staff in the recently revised program policy guidance.

== Use in other practices as a tool for sustainability ==
Adaptive management as a systematic process for improving environmental management policies and practices is the traditional application however, the adaptive management framework can also be applied to other sectors seeking sustainability solutions such as business and community development. Adaptive management as a strategy emphasizes the need to change with the environment and to learn from doing. Adaptive management applied to ecosystems makes overt sense when considering ever changing environmental conditions. The flexibility and constant learning of an adaptive management approach is also a logical application for organizations seeking sustainability methodologies.

Businesses pursuing sustainability strategies would employ an adaptive management framework to ensure that the organization is prepared for the unexpected and geared for change. By applying an adaptive management approach the business begins to function as an integrated system adjusting and learning from a multi-faceted network of influences not just environmental but also, economic and social (Dunphy, Griffths, & Benn, 2007). The goal of any sustainable organization guided by adaptive management principals must be to engage in active learning to direct change towards sustainability (Verine, 2008). This "learning to manage by managing to learn" (Bormann BT, 1993) will be at the core of a sustainable business strategy.

Sustainable community development requires recognition of the relationship between environment, economics and social instruments within the community. An adaptive management approach to creating sustainable community policy and practice also emphasizes the connection and confluence of those elements. Looking into the cultural mechanisms which contribute to a community value system often highlights the parallel to adaptive management practices, "with [an] emphasis on feedback learning, and its treatment of uncertainty and unpredictability." Often this is the result of indigenous knowledge and historical decisions of societies deeply rooted in ecological practices. By applying an adaptive management approach to community development the resulting systems can develop built in sustainable practice as explained by the Environmental Advisory Council (2002), "active adaptive management views policy as a set of experiments designed to reveal processes that build or sustain resilience. It requires, and facilitates, a social context with flexible and open institutions and multi-level governance systems that allow for learning and increase adaptive capacity without foreclosing future development options."

A practical example of adaptive management as a tool for sustainability was the application of a modified variation of adaptive management using artvoice, photovoice, and agent-based modeling in a participatory social framework of action. This application was used in field research on tribal lands to first identify the environmental issue and impact of illegal trash dumping and then to discover a solution through iterative agent-based modeling using NetLogo on a theoretical "regional cooperative clean-energy economy". This cooperative economy incorporated a mixed application of: traditional trash recycling and a waste-to-fuels process of carbon recycling of non-recyclable trash into ethanol fuel. This industrial waste-to-fuels application was inspired by pioneering work of the Canadian-based company, Enerkem. See Bruss, 2012 - PhD dissertation: Human Environment Interactions and Collaborative Adaptive Capacity Building in a Resilience Framework, GDPE Colorado State University.

In an ever-changing world, adaptive management appeals to many practices seeking sustainable solutions by offering a framework for decision making that proposes to support a sustainable future which, "conserves and nurtures the diversity—of species, of human opportunity, of learning institutions and of economic options."

== Effectiveness ==
It is difficult to test the effectiveness of adaptive management in comparison to other management approaches. One challenge is that once a system is managed using one approach it is difficult to determine how another approach would have performed in exactly the same situation. One study tested the effectiveness of formal passive adaptive management in comparison to human intuition by having natural resource management students make decisions about how to harvest a hypothetical fish population in an online computer game. The students on average performed poorly in comparison to the computer programs implementing passive adaptive management.

Collaborative adaptive management is often celebrated as an effective way to deal with natural resource management under high levels of conflict, uncertainty and complexity. The effectiveness of these efforts can be constrained by both social and technical barriers. As the case of the Glenn Canyon Dam Adaptive Management Program in the US illustrates, effective collaborative adaptive management efforts require clear and measurable goals and objectives, incentives and tools to foster collaboration, long-term commitment to monitoring and adaptation, and straightforward joint fact-finding protocols.

In Colorado, USA, a ten-year, ranch-scale (2590 ha) experiment began in 2012 at the Agricultural Research Service (ARS) Central Plains Experimental range to evaluate the effectiveness and process of collaborative adaptive management on rangelands. The Collaborative Adaptive Rangeland Management or “CARM” project monitors outcomes from yearling steer grazing management on 10, 130 ha pastures conducted by a group of conservationists, ranchers, and public employees, and researchers. This team compares ecological monitoring data tracking profitability and conservation outcomes with outcomes from a “traditional” management treatment: a second set of ten pastures managed without adaptive decision making but with the same stocking rate. Early evaluations of the project by social scientists offer insights for more effective adaptive management.

First, trust is primary and essential to learning in adaptive management, not a side benefit. Second, practitioners cannot assume that extensive monitoring data or large-scale efforts will automatically facilitate successful collaborative adaptive management. Active, long-term efforts to build trust among scientists and stakeholders are also important. Finally, explicit efforts to understand, share and respect multiple types of manager knowledge, including place-based ecological knowledge practiced by local managers, is necessary to manage adaptively for multiple conservation and livelihood goals on rangelands. Practitioners can expect adaptive management to be a complex, non-linear process shaped by social, political and ecological processes, as well as by data collection and interpretation.

== General resources ==
Information and guidance on the entire adaptive management process is available from CMP members' websites and other online sources:

- The Conservation Measures Partnership's Open Standards for the Practice of Conservation provide general guidance and principles for good adaptive management in conservation.
- Miradi Adaptive Management Software for Conservation Projects is user friendly software developed through a joint venture between CMP and Benetech. The software walks conservation teams through each step of the Open Standards.
- Foundations of Success (FOS) Resources and Training web pages list reference materials on adaptive management and monitoring and evaluation, as well as information about online or in-person courses in adaptive management.
- The Nature Conservancy's Conservation Action Planning (CAP) Resources page includes detailed guidance and tools for implementing the CAP adaptive management process. See also TNC's CAP Standards.
- The Wildlife Conservation Society's Living Landscapes page contains extensive guidance materials on WCS's approach to adaptive management.
- WWF's web page on the WWF Standards of Conservation Project and Programme Management contains detailed guidance, resources, and tools for the steps in WWF's adaptive management process.
- Measures of Success: Designing, Managing, and Monitoring Conservation and Development Projects, written in 1998 by Richard Margoluis and Nick Salafsky, was one of the first detailed manuals about applying adaptive management to conservation projects. Also available in Spanish.
- Foundations of Success (FOS) web pages list Asian Rhino and Elephant Program Evaluation in 2004.
- Foundations of Success (FOS) web pages list National Fish & Wildlife Foundation's Coral Fund in 2007.
- Foundations of Success (FOS) web pages list Ocean Conservancy's Overfishing Scorecard in 2007.
- The Department of Fish and Game (DFG) web pages list Adapting to Climate Change programme.
- U.S. Army Corps of Engineers web pages list Louisiana Coastal Protection and Restoration Final Technical Report in 2009.
- Washington State Department of Natural Resource (CMR) web pages list Forest Practices Adaptive Management Program in 2010.

== See also ==
- Conservation biology
- Decision cycle
- Decision theory
- Ecology
- Fisheries
- Forestry
- Learning cycle
- Operations research
- Optimization (mathematics)
- Silviculture
