= Louis H. Hahlo =

American politician

Louis Herbert Hahlo
- Born: January 17, 1865; New York City, New York, U.S.
- Died: May 25, 1932 (aged 67); New York City, New York, U.S.
- Resting place: Salem Fields Cemetery
- Education: City College of New York; Columbia Law School
- Occupations: Lawyer; Politician
- Political party: Democratic Party
- Parent(s): Herman Hahlo; Rebecca Hoexter

Louis Herbert Hahlo (January 17, 1865 – May 25, 1932) was an American lawyer and politician from New York.

== Life ==
Hahlo was born on January 17, 1865, in New York City, New York, the son of German immigrants Herman Hahlo and Rebecca Hoexter.

Hahlo attended the New York City public schools and graduated from the College of the City of New York in 1884. He then began studying law in the office of Blumenstiel & Hirsch. He also attended Columbia Law School, graduating from there in 1886. He was admitted to the bar later that year and practiced commercial law in New York City. By 1892, he had a law office at 280 Broadway.

In 1891, Hahlo was elected to the New York State Assembly as a Democrat, representing the New York County 21st District. He served in the Assembly in 1892 and 1893. While in the Assembly, he submitted bills that prevented debtors from giving preferences in judgement, provided for the recording of certificates showing mortgage payments, concerned the pavement of New York City streets, amended the Code of Civil Procedures for appeals, authorized the Commissioners of the Sinking Fund of New York to cancel certain assessments, and allowed the substitution of other fireproof material in buildings than stone, brick, or terra-cotta. He also served on the judiciary committee to investigate charges against New York Court of Appeals Justice Isaac H. Maynard.

Hahlo served as Assistant Corporation Counsel from 1898 to 1901 and from 1904 to 1917. During that time, he was in charge of all legal matters in the Department of Finance for seven years. In 1917, he became Deputy Comptroller of New York City. He resigned from the position in 1920, allegedly due to differences with Comptroller Charles L. Craig. He maintained a private law practice later in life.

Hahlo died from a heart attack in his hotel suite at the Hotel Martinique on May 25, 1932. He was unmarried. He was buried in Salem Fields Cemetery.

New York State Assembly
Preceded by Dabid M. Hildreth Jr.	New York State Assembly; New York County, 21st District; 1892-1893	Succeeded by Moses Herrman
