= Candlepower =

Unit of measurement

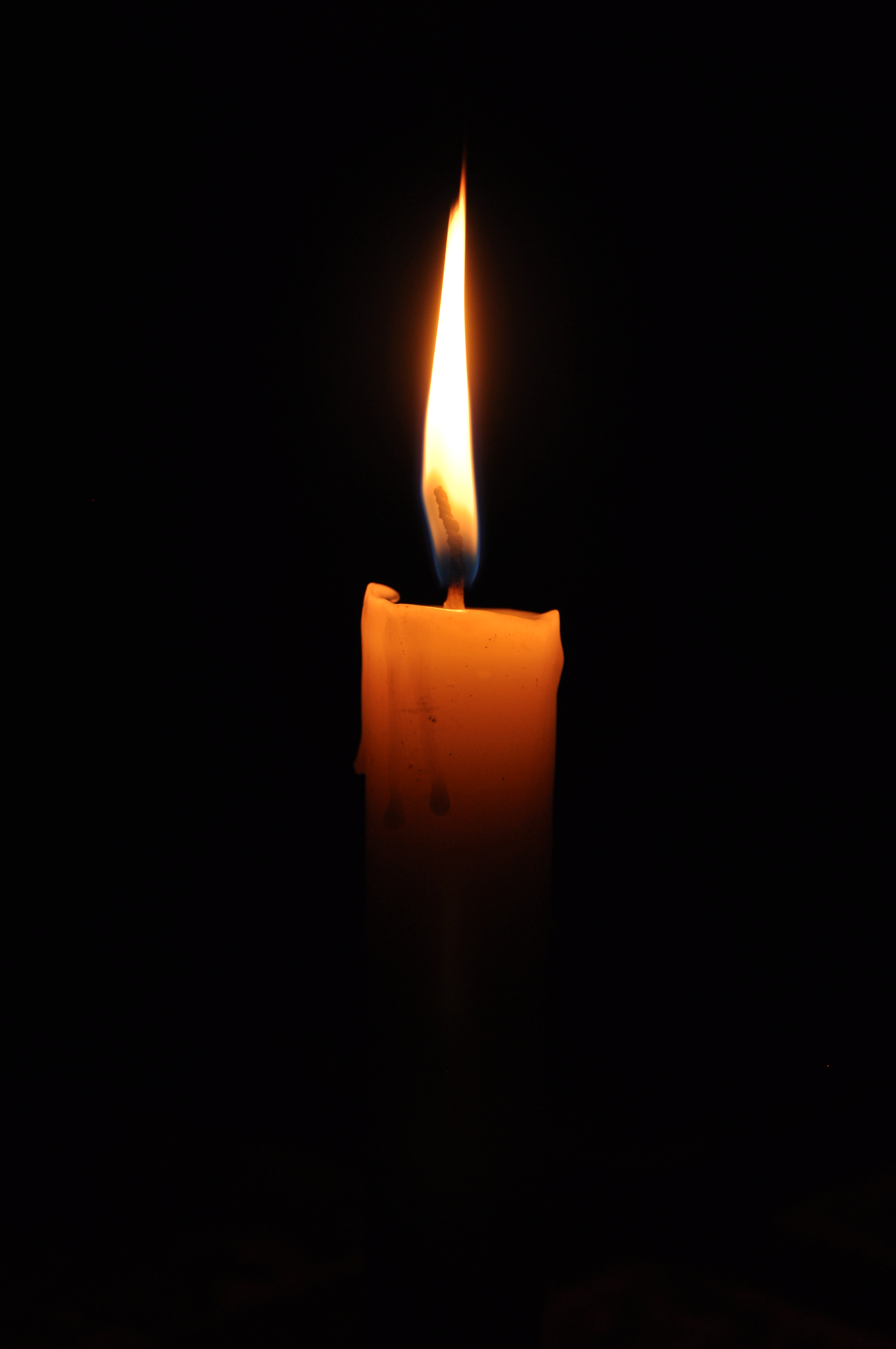
- The candlepower was based on the light emitted from a candle

General information
- Unit system: international standard (obsolete)
- Unit of: Luminous intensity
- Symbol: cp

Conversions
1 cp in ...	... is equal to ...
- SI units: 1 candela (modern definition)

Candlepower (abbreviated as cp or CP) is the unit of luminous intensity in the United States customary systems of measurement. It is currently defined as being equal to 0.981 candela.

== History ==
The term candlepower was originally defined in the United Kingdom, by the Metropolitan Gas Act 1860, as the light produced by a pure spermaceti candle that weighs 1/6 pound (76 grams) and burns at a rate of 120 grains per hour (7.8 grams per hour). Spermaceti is a material from the heads of sperm whales, and was once used to make high-quality candles.

== Calibration of lamps ==
To measure the candlepower of a lamp, a person judged by eye the relative brightness of adjacent surfaces—one illuminated only by a standard lamp (or candle) and the other only by the lamp under test. They adjusted the distance of one of the lamps until the two surfaces appeared to be of equal brightness. Then they calculated the candlepower of the lamp under test from the two distances and the inverse square law.

== See also ==
- Candela
- Lumen (unit)
