= Leo C. Dessar =

American politician (1847–1924)

Leo Charles Dessar (February 15, 1847 – April 20, 1924) was a Kingdom of Bavaria-born Jewish-American lawyer, politician, and judge from New York City.

== Life ==
Dessar was born on February 15, 1847 in the Kingdom of Bavaria. He immigrated to America with his family when he was infant. His father was Dr Julius H. Dessar, president of a Hebrew Institute in Cincinnati, Ohio.

Dessar received his early education from his father's school in Cincinnati. When he was old enough to enlist in the American Civil War, he became a drummer boy in the Union Army and went to the front. After the war, he attended Columbia College and graduated from there with a B.A. in 1868. He then went to Columbia Law School, graduating from there in 1870. He became active in politics shortly afterwards, joining Tammany Hall in what was then the Eleventh Assembly District. At one point, he was associated with Simon M. Ehrlich.

After the Civil War, he served as Lieutenant and Adjutant of the 96th Regiment, New York National Guard. In 1872, he was one of the lawyers in the contested Assembly seat case of Kilian v. Frear. He served as Corresponding Secretary of the Tammany Hall General Committee for two years. In 1874, he was elected to the New York State Assembly as a Democrat, representing the New York County 17th District. He served in the Assembly in 1875. In the Assembly, he was active in passing the Elevated Railroad bills and was appointed to the Committee on Crime.

In 1884, when an additional District Court was created in New York City, Dessar was the Tammany candidate and elected the first Judge of the court. He was judge for three years, after which he resumed his law practice. The elevated railway was being installed during that time, so he made a specialty of representing property owners in the proceedings to obtain indemnity for injury to their holdings caused by erecting elevated structures in front of their property. He became successful and respected in that specialty, but when the proceedings were exhausted he ceased an active law practice and while he maintained a law office until his death he only used it to keep in touch with interests he was safeguarding.

In 1900, Dessar wrote The Royal Enchantress: A Romance of the Last Queen of the Berbers, a fictional account of the part-Jewish Berber queen Kahina who opposed the Muslim conquest of the Maghreb. He was a member of the New York County Lawyers' Association since its organization and served on its Membership Committee from 1910 to 1912. He was also a member of the Freemasons, the Democratic Club, the Harmonie Club, the Nyack Club, the Rockland County Association, and the Freemasons.

Dessar died at home on April 20, 1924. He was buried in Salem Fields Cemetery.

New York State Assembly
| Preceded by Andrew Blessing | New York State Assembly; New York County, 17th District; 1875 | Succeeded by William T. Graff |
