= Simon M. Ehrlich =

Jewish-American lawyer

Simon M. Ehrlich (January 6, 1852 – July 16, 1895) was a Jewish-American lawyer and judge from New York City.

== Life ==
Ehrlich was born on January 6, 1852, in Boston, Massachusetts, the son of German Jewish immigrants. He moved to New York City, New York, with his family when he was five.

Ehrlich was admitted to the bar in January 1872, after which he practiced law at 294 Broadway. He initially practiced law with Leo C. Dessar and later associated with criminal lawyer Charles W. Brooke. He previously studied in the law office of Samuel L. Hirsch, and following Hirsch's death he succeeded his law practice. He practiced exclusively in the civil courts. In 1885, he was elected Judge of the City Court as a Democrat. In 1890, he succeeded David McAdam as Chief Judge of the City Court when McAdam joined the Superior Court. He was re-elected to the City Court in 1891, and in 1892 City Court judges re-elected him Chief Judge. Deeply interested in Jewish welfare matters, he was also a member of several Jewish fraternal organizations and charitable groups.

Ehrlich died at his summer residence in Throggs Neck from typhoid fever on July 16, 1895. It was believed his illness was caused by the unsanitary conditions of the court rooms at City Hall, which the Board of Health previously called attention to. Rabbi Gustav Gottheil conducted his funeral service at Temple Emanu-El, with Rabbi Joseph Silverman assisting. The pallbearers included City Court Justices Robert A. Van Wyck, Joseph E. Newburger, James M. FitzSimons, John H. McCarthy, and Lewis J. Conlan, Court of Common Pleas Judge Leonard A. Giegerich, Superior Court Judge David McAdam, Recorder John W. Goff, S. Burdett Hyatt, Ernest Hall, Edward Browne, Henry P. McGown, ex-State Senator Charles G. Cornell, Lawrence Delmour, Washington L. Jacques, David Leventritt, Albert J. Elias, Michael F. Daly, and ex-Immigration Commissioner Edward L. Ridgeway. He was buried in the family plot at Salem Fields Cemetery in Cypress Hills.
