= Moses Herrman =

Jewish-American lawyer

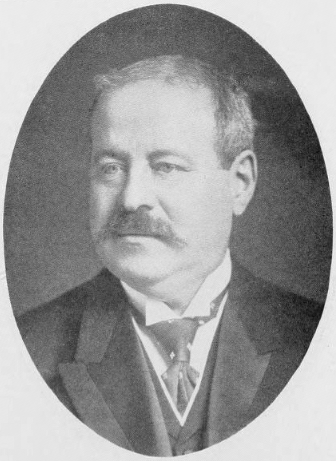

Member of the New York State Assembly
- In office 1894
- Constituency: New York County 21st District

Personal details
- Born: April 29, 1858 New York, New York, US
- Died: February 14, 1927 (aged 68) New York, New York, US
- Resting place: Beth-El Cemetery, Brooklyn
- Party: Democratic
- Occupation: Lawyer, politician, judge

Moses Herrman (April 29, 1858 – February 14, 1927) was a Jewish-American lawyer, politician, and judge from New York.

== Life ==
Herrman was born on April 29, 1858, in New York City, New York, the son of Gerson N. Herrman and Celia Moses.

Herrman attended public school and the College of the City of New York. He began studying law in the office of former United States Attorney Samuel G. Courtney. He then went to the New York University School of Law, graduating from there with an LL.B. in 1878. He began practicing as a lawyer afterwards, and by 1906 he had a law office at 229 Broadway.

In 1893, he was elected to the New York State Assembly as a Democrat, representing the New York County 21st District. He served in the Assembly in 1894, during which time he presented bills that indefinitely extended commissioners' terms of office to secure uniformity of laws in the United States, provided for the appointment of inspector of meters, was related to the assignment of debtors, and prevented to the erection of costly buildings by savings banks. He lost the 1894 re-election to the Assembly to Republican Howard Payson Wilds, and in 1895 he lost an Assembly election to represent the 29th District to Republican Samuel G. French.

In 1898, New York County District Attorney Asa Bird Gardiner appointed Herrman Deputy District Attorney. He also served as Deputy District Attorney under Eugene A. Philbin. In 1905, he ran for Municipal Court Justice, only to lose the election to Republican Edgar J. Lauer. In 1906, Mayor George B. McClellan Jr. appointed him Commissioner of Parks for Manhattan and Richmond. In 1907, McClellan appointed him a City Magistrate. He was reappointed City Magistrate by Mayor William Jay Gaynor in 1912. In 1913, Mayor Gaynor appointed him Justice of the Court of Special Sessions. He was reappointed Justice by Mayor John Francis Hylan in 1921. He was still serving as Justice until a few days before his death.

Active in political and fraternal circles prior to becoming a Special Sessions Justice, Herrman was vice-president of the Young Men's Hebrew Association of New York, secretary of the Purim Association, treasurer of the National Democratic Club, president of the Osceola Club and his B'nai B'rith lodge.

Herrman died in his apartment at the Great Northern Hotel on February 14, 1927, a few days after suffering a stroke of apoplexy. Rabbi Samuel Schulman officiated his funeral at Temple Beth-El and Special Sessions Justice Frederic Kernochan delivered the eulogy. The honorary pallbearers included Kernochan, Arthur C. Salmon, Joseph D. Kelly, A. V. B. Voorhees, James J. McInerney, William T. Fetherston, Daniel A. Direnzo, Henry W. Herbert, Charles P. Caldwell, and former Special Sessions Justice Joseph F. Moss. Around 500 people attended the funeral, including General Sessions Judges Otto A. Rosalsky, Max S. Levine, and Cornelius F. Collins, New York Supreme Court Justice Isidor Wasservogel, Tammany Hall Secretary James F. Egan, Criminal Bar Association President Ely Rosenberg, Assistant District Attorney Harold W. Hastings, Edward L. Garvan, Magistrate Morris Gottlieb, Frank Briarly, former Magistrate Henry W. Unger, Assemblyman Frederick L. Hackenburg, and Chief Clerk of the General Sessions Court Frank Smith. He was buried in the Beth-El Cemetery in Brooklyn.

New York State Assembly
Preceded by Louis H. Hahlo	New York State Assembly; New York County, 21st District; 1894	Succeeded by Howard Payson Wilds
