= David M. Posner =

American rabbi (1947–2018)

Rabbi David M. Posner
- Born: November 4, 1947; Brooklyn, NY
- Died: October 19, 2018 (aged 70); New York, NY
- Occupation: Rabbi
- Years active: 1973 - 2018
- Known for: Congressional Rabbi at Temple Emanu-El, New York

David M. Posner (November 4, 1947 - October 19, 2018) was an American rabbi who led the flagship Reform temple, Temple Emanu-El, in New York, NY for 40 years as a congregational rabbi.

Posner was a scholar of comparative Semitic languages, including Aramaic and Syriac.

== Biography ==
Posner was born in Atlantic City to Ralph and Doris (Silver) Posner. His mother was a homemaker who later became a schoolteacher. His father was an executive at a shipping logistics company. When he was a child, the family moved to Brownsville, Brooklyn, where he attended Meyer Levin Junior High School and Samuel J. Tilden High.

Immediately following his ordination from Hebrew Union College in Cincinnati in 1973, Posner joined the rabbinical staff of Temple Emanu-El. Known as the consummate congregational rabbi, the New York Times wrote that he was "a thoughtful, meticulous man, not a showboat", and that "rather than forming institutes or posing with politicians, he liked to stay at the temple — his battle station, as he called it — waiting for his congregants to call." In 1998, he received the Doctor of Divinity degree, honoris causa from Hebrew Union College. He died of Alzheimer's disease in 2018.

== Awards and recognition ==
- 2007, ranked 23rd most influential rabbi in America in Newsweek's Top 50 Rabbis in America
- 2014, received Dr. Bernard Heller Prize from Hebrew Union College - Institute of Religion
