= Alfred Steckler =

American judge (1856–1929)

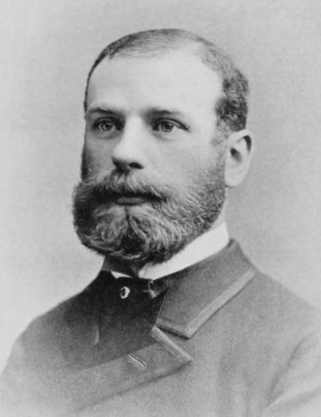
- Born: December 18, 1856; New York, New York, US
- Died: June 10, 1929 (aged 72); New York, New York, US
- Burial place: Salem Fields Cemetery
- Education: Columbia Law School
- Occupations: Lawyer, Judge
- Spouses: Carrie Seligman (m. 1886; died 1907) Gussie Nordlinger Westheimer (m. 1909)

Alfred Steckler (December 18, 1856 – June 10, 1929) was a Jewish-American lawyer and judge from New York.

== Life ==
Steckler was born on December 18, 1856, in New York City, New York, the son of Louis Steckler and Henrietta Lyon.

Steckler attended public schools. When he was seventeen, he was appointed managing clerk in the office of a prominent law firm. He went to Columbia Law School, graduating from there in 1877. He then began practicing law with his brother Charles. He was considered an authority on matters related to the rights of benevolent and fraternal organizations and their members. He was counsel for a majority of labor unions in Manhattan, including the Musical Mutual Protective Union, the Bricklayers' Union, the Cigar Maker's Union, and the Tailors' Union. In one court case, he established the principle that the endowment due to widows and orphans of deceased members couldn't be attached or levied upon to satisfy the deceased members' debts.

In 1881, Steckler was elected Judge of the Fourth District Court as an Independent. He served as Judge until 1893. As Judge, he abolished the dispossess bureau, introduced reforms regarding how the district courts drew juries in jury trials, and considered the needs of the immigrant communities on the Lower East Side. In 1895, he unsuccessfully ran as an Independent candidate for the New York Supreme Court. In 1901, Governor Benjamin Odell appointed him to the New York Supreme Court to fill a vacancy.

As a young man, Steckler was president of the Peter Cooper Literary Society and Hebrew Union. He was a member of various charitable institutions, including the Hebrew Orphan Asylum, the Isabella Heimath, the Montefiore Home, the Hebrew Sheltering Society, Mount Sinai Hospital, and the Home for Aged and Infirm Hebrews. He was also a member of the Freemasons, the Free Sons of Israel, B'nai B'rith, the Odd Fellows, and the Knights of Pythias. In 1886, he married Carrie Seligman. They had one child, Alfred Jr. Carrie was killed in 1907 when a locomotive struck their car at a crossing near Harrington, New Jersey. Steckler was seriously injured in the accident. In 1909, he married Gussie Nordlinger Westheimer.

Steckler died in Mount Sinai Hospital on June 10, 1929. Rabbi Joseph Silverman led the funeral service at Temple Emanu-El. He was buried in Salem Fields Cemetery.
