= Mel Sachs =

American criminal defense attorney (1946–2006)

- Born: June 3, 1946; New York City
- Died: August 30, 2006 (aged 60); New York City
- Education: Boston University
- Occupation: Criminal defense attorney

Mel Sachs (June 3, 1946 – August 30, 2006) was an American criminal defense attorney in New York City.

== Early life and education ==
Sachs was born on June 3, 1946, in New York City. He went to Boston University for college and continued on to Brooklyn Law School. Sachs first worked at The Legal Aid Society.

== Career ==
During his career, he represented many prominent celebrities including Mike Tyson. One of his most famous cases was representing Sante Kimes. Two other high-profile cases were that of convicted serial killer Alejandro Henriquez and American rapper Lil' Kim. He was a frequent guest on talk shows hosted by Bill O'Reilly, Sean Hannity, Larry King, and Greta Van Susteren. Sean Penn used him as his role model in the making of the film Carlito's Way. He was famous for incorporating his passion for magic into his court room arguments. He taught at Cornell University Law School, Emory University Law School, Hofstra University School of Law, and the University of Colorado Law School. Sachs also served on the corporate boards of the Inland Fiber Group LLC and the U.S. Timberlands Services Company LLC. He was an active member of Congregation Emanu-El of New York.

Sachs died on August 30, 2006, in New York City.
