= Edgar J. Lauer =

US lawyer and judge (1871–1948)

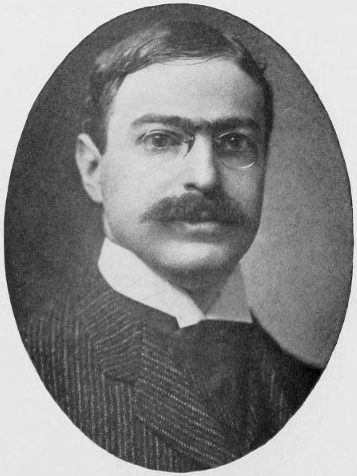
- Born: Edgar Jay Lauer; November 10, 1871; New York, New York, US
- Died: November 9, 1948 (aged 76); New York, New York, US
- Burial place: Salem Fields Cemetery
- Education: Columbia Law School
- Occupations: Lawyer, judge
- Political party: Republican
- Spouse: Elma M. Kramer (m. 1932)

Edgar Jay Lauer (November 10, 1871 – November 9, 1948) was a lawyer and judge from New York City.

== Life ==
Lauer was born on November 10, 1871, in New York City, New York, the son of William Emanuel Lauer and Cecilia Hornthal.

Lauer attended Columbia Grammar School and Columbia University. He graduated from Columbia Law School with an LL.B. in 1891, studied law in the office of Hoadly, Lauterbach & Johnson, and was admitted to the bar in 1892. He practiced law with Mortimer Stiefel from 1895 to 1897. He was appointed private secretary of New York Supreme Court Justice James A. Blanchard. in 1900. In 1905, he was the Republican candidate for Justice of the Municipal Court. He also ran with the Municipal Ownership League and was elected Justice over Democratic candidate Moses Herrman. He was re-elected Justice in 1915 and 1925. In January 1933, Mayor John P. O'Brien appointed him President Justice of the Municipal Court. He was an authority on conciliation arbitration, especially in connection with labor disputes, and wrote a number of articles in legal journals on the subject. He also wrote Lauer's Municipal Court Practice in 1916 and The Tenant and his Landlord with Victor House in 1921.

In 1933, Lauer was elected Justice of the New York Supreme Court, First District as a Republican-Fusion candidate, the only person elected Justice. He was inducted as Justice in January 1934. In September 1937, he paid over ten thousand dollars in duties and penalties on jewelry, furs, and wearable apparel his wife Elma failed to declare when they returned from a trip to Europe. In the fall of 1938, the maid, outraged at anti-Hitler remarks made at a Lauer dinner party, informed the federal authorities that Elma smuggled again. A search of the Lauer apartment revealed undeclared finery, which led to an intensive federal investigation. Elma, Jack Benny, and George Burns were all revealed to have received articles smuggled into the country by the self-styled diplomat Albert N. Chaperau. Chaperau was sent to prison for two years while Benny and Burns pleaded guilty to smuggling indictments and paid fines. Since it was Elma's second offense, she received a three-month jail sentence and a $2,500 fine in April 1939. In that month, Federal Attorney John T. Cahill sent a letter to Governor Herbert H. Lehman charging Laurer with being involved in the second smuggling. Lehman forwarded the letter to the State Legislature to decide what actions should be done to him, and the Senate and Assembly's Judiciary Committees convened to discuss the issue. In response, in May 1939 he announced he would resign effective June 15 that year; he insisted he was innocent, but he believed the accusation compromised his usefulness as judge and it was necessary for him to resign. His resignation led to the investigation against him to be dropped.

In 1936, Portuguese Consul General Verdades de Faria decorated Lauer with the cross of the Officer of Devotement of the Republic of Portugal. He was a director of Surprise Lake Camp, vice-president and trustee of the Educational Alliance, a national council member of the Boy Scouts of America and vice-president of its Manhattan council, receiver of the Silver Beaver Award for his service to the Boy Scouts, and a member of the American Bar Association, the New York State Bar Association, the New York City Bar Association, and the National Republican Club. He attended Temple Emanu-El. In 1932, he married Elma M. Kramer, the widow of Albert M. Kramer and a prominent member of the American colony in Paris.

Lauer moved to Paris, France, in 1945, but when he fell ill he flew back to New York City. He died a month later in Mount Sinai Hospital on November 9, 1948. He was buried in Salem Fields Cemetery.
