= Kai Lee =

Kai N. Lee
- Born: New York, NY
- Education: Columbia University, Princeton, UC Berkeley
- Known for: adaptive management theory
- Title: Program Officer of Science, Conservation and Science Program, Packard Foundation

Kai Lee is the program officer of science for the Conservation and Science Program of the Packard Foundation. Lee's work focuses on science-based environmental issues. Lee is well regarded for his advocacy of Adaptive Management.

== Early life ==
Kai N. Lee grew up in Manhattan, New York, the single child of Chofeng Lin, a United Nations employee, and Hsin Chih Lee, an accountant for businesses in Chinatown.

Growing up, Lee's parents encouraged him to do well in school.

== Education ==
In 1966, Lee graduated from Columbia with a degree in Experimental Physics, and in 1971, he received his Ph.D. in physics from Princeton. After finishing his doctorate, he pursued a post-doctoral fellowship at UC Berkeley. At UC Berkeley, Lee met Dr. Todd Laporte, who became his mentor and introduced him to the environmental movement. Even though Lee's primary field of research was not based in Political Science, Dr. Todd Laporte, a political scientist at UC Berkeley, saw great potential in Kai Lee.

Following his research at UC Berkeley, Lee went on to the University of Washington in Seattle, where he met two colleagues, Dr. Gordon Oreans, a biologist, and Dr. Don Matthews, a political scientist.

Lee believes that minority students bring important and sometimes beneficially different cultural and psychological perspectives to the field of environmental studies. For this reason Lee has worked with many minority students through summer research projects during his academic career.

== Academic career ==
Kai Lee served as a professor at the University of Washington in Seattle from 1973 to 1991. During this time, he sat on the board of the Northwest Power Planning Council.

Kai Lee published his first major works while in Seattle. The first was a book, published in 1980, concerning the role of electric power in the Pacific Northwest. The second was a discussion paper published by the Northwest Power Planning Council in 1982 concerning the approach taken by future energy policy in the region. In the paper, Lee argued that because any plan for a regional system has uncertainties, there would be risks involved with the plan. These risks could be managed by selecting a combination of programs that would minimize the risk taken. Lee also recognized that this approach was different from previous approaches, so he asserted that discussion and criticism of this plan was greatly needed. These ideas would greatly inform his later thinking.

Kai Lee then accepted a professorship as the Director of the Center of Environmental Studies at Williams College in Williamstown, Massachusetts. He would hold the post twice, from 1991 to 1998 and 2001–2002. When he left Williams College in 2007, he held the title of Rosenburg Professor of Environmental Studies emeritus.

Kai Lee's best-known book, Compass and Gyroscope (1993), would be published during his time at Williams College. A treatise on public policy, Compass and Gyroscope argued that the best way for public policy to serve humanity in the future would be to adopt “social learning” into policymaking.

Social learning combined the theory of adaptive management with a pragmatic approach to politics. The theory of adaptive management views public policy experimentally: any policy has to be constructed to obtain knowledge through trial and error. If a policy works, it would be left alone. Conversely, if a policy didn't work, it would be easily reversible. Lee described the process as similar to using a compass: if the compass gave the right bearing, the user could continue to follow the path, and if the compass gave the wrong bearing, the user could easily retrace his steps and obtain another, more correct bearing. Adaptive management would be supplemented by politics, which Lee described as “bounded conflict.” The process of adaptive management would inevitably create conflict; it was the role of the political process to discuss and criticize a policy that was not working in order to create better policy. This would be similar to a gyroscope, which charts a ship's course independent of external influences. Social learning would essentially be a feedback loop between adaptive management and the political process.

Kai Lee also served on the Board of Sustainable Development of the National Research Council during his time at Williams College, and incorporated his ideas into Our Common Journey (1999), a book that outlines the purpose of the Board of Sustainable Development. The book illustrates the best practical application of social learning toward public policy; in this case social learning would help the board achieve a goal of global sustainability, which it defined as “a concept that linked global peace, freedom, improved living conditions and a healthy environment.”

== The Packard Foundation ==
The "David and Lucile Packard Foundation" was created in 1964 by David Packard (1912–1996), the co-founder of the Hewlett-Packard Company, and Lucile Salter Packard (1914–1987)” (“About the Foundation”). The Packard Foundation is an organization that provides volunteer leadership and private funding for the benefit of the public. "The Packard Foundation is committed to advancing collaborative research and grant-making in the sciences as a critical component of long-term conservation” (Foster: 2006). The organization focuses its grant-making into three program areas: Conservation and Science Program, Population and Reproductive Health Program, and Children, Families, and Communities Program.

In June 2007, Kai Lee was assigned the position of program officer for Science in the Conservation and Science Program. His “role at the Foundation [focuses] largely on supporting the development and application of an ecosystem-based management (EBM) framework for coastal-marine conservation and fisheries management” (Foster: 2006). Lee also works “closely with Conservation and Science Program Director Walter V. Reid to develop a long-range grant-making strategy to strengthen the contribution of science to public and private sector decision-making concerning conservation and the environment” (Foster: 2006). Kai Lee wishes to establish a link between those conducting this research and the politicians who have the power to enforce long-term conservation policies.
