= Ephraim Arnold Jacob =

Jewish-American lawyer and judge

Ephraim Arnold Jacob (January 14, 1845 – August 24, 1905) was a Jewish-American lawyer and judge from New York.

== Life ==
Jacob was born on January 14, 1845, in Philadelphia, Pennsylvania, the son of Julius Jacob.

Jacob moved to New York City, New York, with his family shortly after his birth and went to school there. He graduated from the College of the City of New York in 1864 and from Columbia Law School in 1866. He was admitted to the bar in 1867 and began a private law practice in New York City. He also edited a number of legal works, including eleven volumes of the Digest of the English Common Law from 1879 to 1886 and New York Common Pleas Report in volumes ten through seventeen of Daly's Reports in 1894.

Jacob was consul of the Central National Bank of New York City. The bank's president was William Lafayette Strong, who became Mayor of New York City in January 1895. In June of that year, Strong appointed Jacob, a Democrat, Justice of the new Court of Special Sessions for a six-year term. His term as Justice expired in 1901, after which he returned to his law practice.

Jacob died at home from a short illness on August 24, 1905. He had a wife and two daughters. He was buried in Salem Fields Cemetery.
