= Raymond Wagner =

Luxembourgish footballer

Personal information
- Date of birth: 10 November 1921
- Place of birth: Dudelange, Luxembourg
- Date of death: 24 September 1997 (aged 75)
- Place of death: Lullange, Luxembourg

International career
Years	Team	Apps	(Gls)
- Luxembourg

Raymond Wagner (10 November 1921 – 24 September 1997) was a Luxembourgish footballer. He competed in the men's tournament at the 1948 Summer Olympics. He was also President of the Luxembourg Football Federation from 1981 until 1986
