= Congregation Emanu-El of New York =

Reform Jewish congregation in New York City

Coordinates: 40°46′4.89″N 73°58′10.89″W

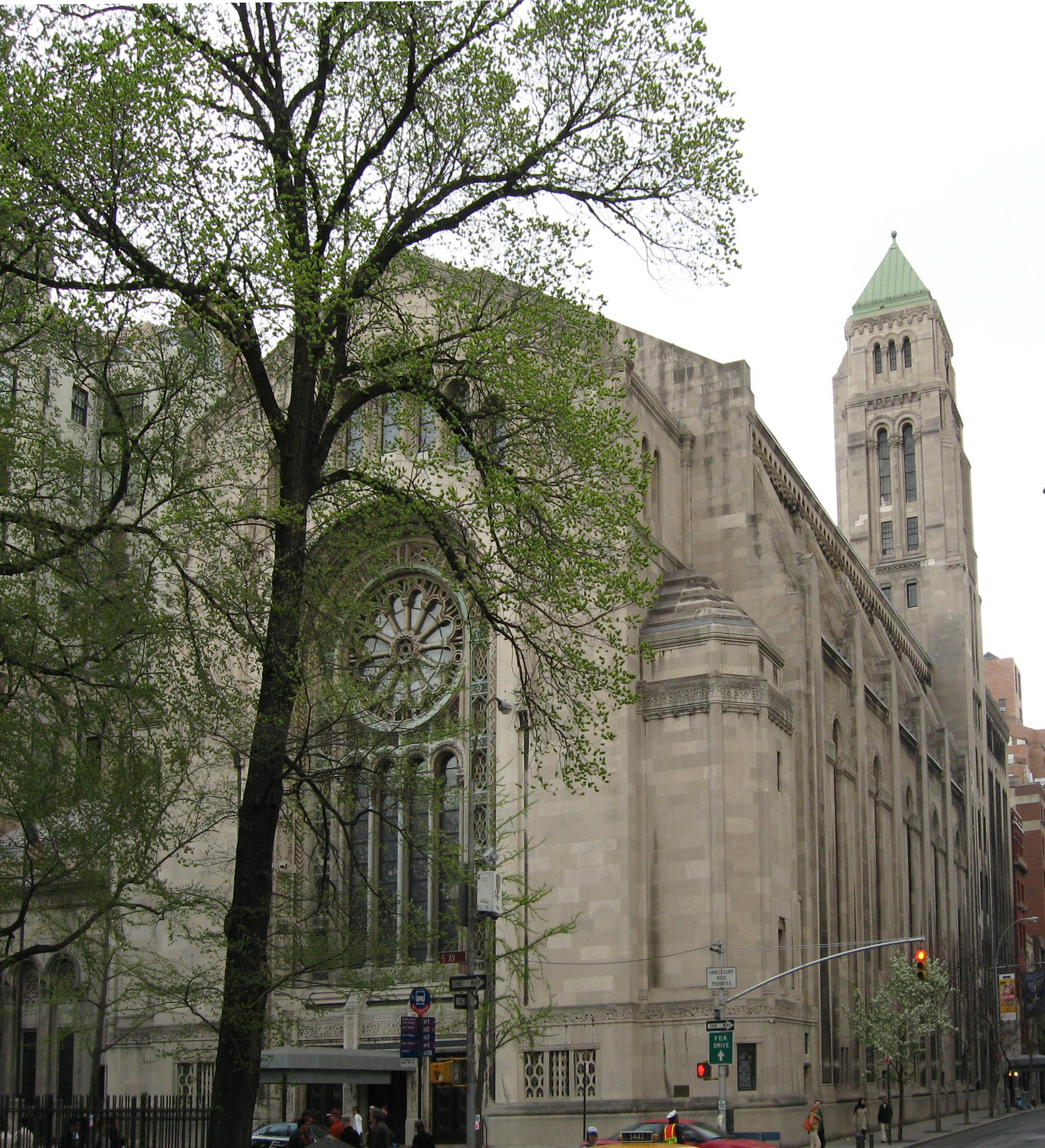
- The current synagogue building, completed in 1930
- Formation: 1845; 181 years ago
- Type: Religious congregation
- Purpose: Reform Judaism
- Location: Upper East Side, Manhattan, New York City
- Members: About 2,500 families
- Senior Rabbi: Joshua M. Davidson
- Main organ: Board of Directors
- Volunteers: Yes
- Website: emanuelnyc.org

Congregation Emanu-El of New York is the oldest Reform Jewish congregation in New York City. It has served as a flagship congregation in the Reform branch of Judaism since its founding in 1845. The Art Deco building it uses – (called "Temple Emanu-El of New York") – was built in 1928–1930 and is one of the largest synagogue buildings in the world.

The congregation currently comprises about 2,500 families and has been led by Senior Rabbi Joshua M. Davidson since July 2013. The congregation is located at 1 East 65th Street on the Upper East Side of Manhattan. The Temple houses the Bernard Museum of Judaica, the congregation's collection of more than 1,000 Jewish ceremonial art objects.

== History ==
=== 1845–1926 ===
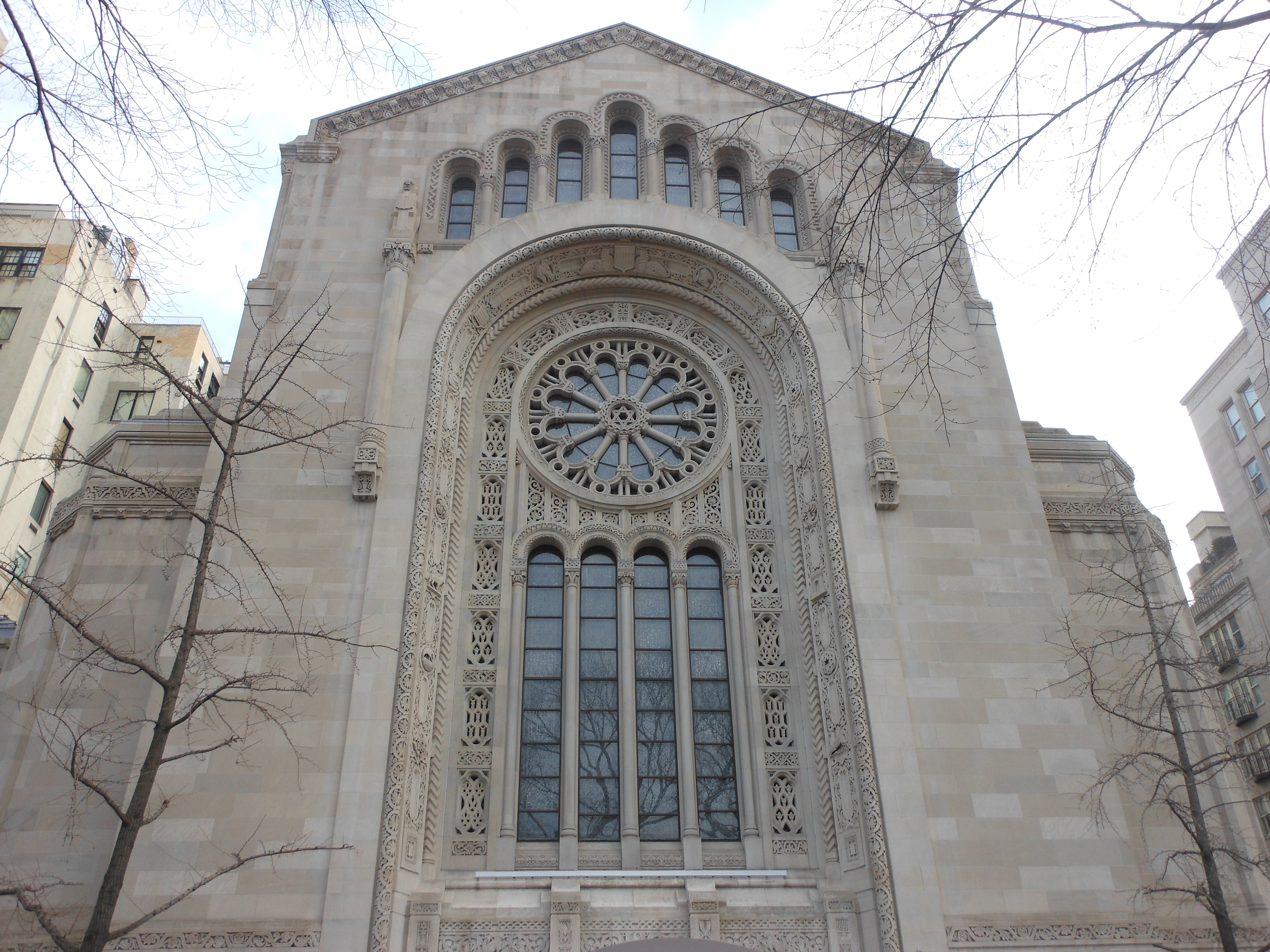
Temple Emanu-El Front Facade

The congregation was founded by 33 mainly German Jews who assembled for services in April 1845 in a rented hall near Grand and Clinton Streets in Manhattan's Lower East Side. The first services they held were highly traditional. The Temple (as it became known) moved several times as the congregation grew larger and wealthier.

In October 1847, the congregation moved to a former Methodist church at 56 Chrystie Street. The congregation commissioned architect Leopold Eidlitz to draw up plans for the renovation of the church into a synagogue. Radical departures from Orthodox religious practice were soon introduced to Temple Emanu-El, setting precedents that proclaimed the principles of "classical" Reform Judaism in America. In 1848, the German vernacular spoken by the congregants replaced the traditional liturgical language of Hebrew in prayer books. Instrumental music, formerly banished from synagogues, was first played during services in 1849 when an organ was installed. In 1853, the tradition of calling congregants for aliyot was abolished (but retained for bar mitzvah ceremonies), leaving the reading of the Torah exclusively to the presiding rabbi. By 1869 the Chrystie Street building became the home of Congregation Beth Israel Bikur Cholim.

Further changes were made in 1854 when Temple Emanu-El moved to 12th Street. Most controversially, mixed seating was adopted, allowing families to sit together, instead of segregating the sexes on opposite sides of a mechitza. After much heated debate, the congregation also resolved to observe Rosh Hashanah for only one day rather than the customary two.

In 1857, after the death of founding Rabbi Leo Merzbacher, German speakers still formed a majority of the congregation and appointed another German Jew, Samuel Adler, to be his successor.

In 1868, Emanu-El erected a new building for the first time, a Moorish Revival structure by Leopold Eidlitz, assisted by Henry Fernbach at 43rd Street and 5th Avenue after raising about $650,000.

The congregation hired its first English-speaking rabbi, Gustav Gottheil, in 1873, from Manchester, England.

In 1888, Joseph Silverman became the first American-born rabbi to officiate at the Temple. He was a member of the second class to graduate from Hebrew Union College.

The 1870s and 1880s witnessed further departures from traditional ritual. Men could now pray without wearing kippot to cover their heads. Bar mitzvah ceremonies were no longer held. The Union Prayer Book was adopted in 1895.

Felix Adler, the founder of the Ethical Culture movement, came to New York as a child when his father, Samuel L. Adler, took over as the rabbi of Temple Emanu-El, an appointment that placed him among the most influential figures in Reform Judaism.

In 1924, Lazare Saminsky became music director of the Temple, and made it a center of Jewish music. He also composed and commissioned music for the Temple services.

=== 1926–present ===
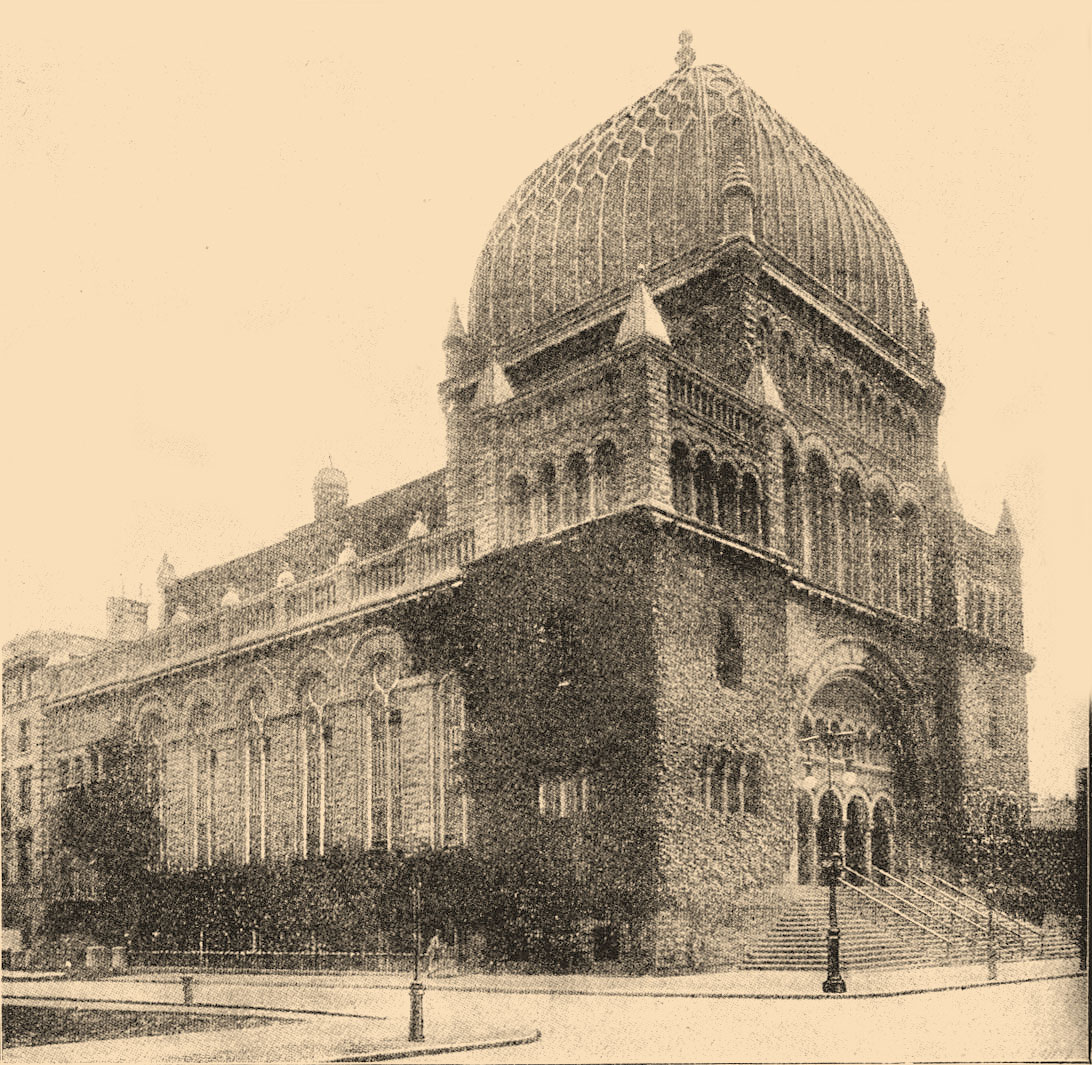
The Temple Beth-El congregation (synagogue pictured) at 76th Street merged in 1927 with Congregation Emanu-El.

In January 1926, the 1868 synagogue building was sold for $6,500,000 to the developer Benjamin Winter Sr., who sold it to Joseph Durst in December 1926 for $7,000,000. In 1927, Durst demolished the building to make room for commercial development.

Emanu-El merged with New York's Temple Beth-El on April 11, 1927; they are considered co-equal parents of the current Emanu-El. The new synagogue was built in 1928 to 1930.

By the 1930s, Emanu-El began to absorb large numbers of Jews whose families had arrived in poverty from Eastern Europe and brought with them their Yiddish language and devoutly Orthodox religious heritage. In contrast, Emanu-El was dominated by affluent German-speaking Jews whose liberal approaches to Judaism originated in Western Europe, where civic emancipation had enticed Jews to discard many of their ethnoreligious customs and embrace the lifestyles of their neighbors. For the descendants of Eastern European immigrants, joining Temple Emanu-El often signified their upward mobility and progress in assimilating into American society. However, the intake of these new congregants also helped to slow or halt, if not force, a limited retreat from, the 'rejectionist' attitude which "classical" Reform had espoused towards traditional ritual.

From 1934 to 1947, Samuel H. Goldenson (1878–1962) was the senior rabbi of Temple Emanu-El. He was president of the Central Conference of American Rabbis from 1933 to 1935.

In 1973, David M. Posner joined the rabbinical staff. Known for his active involvement in the community, he served as the congregation's Senior Emeritus rabbi after his retirement.

== Synagogues of Congregation Emanu-El ==
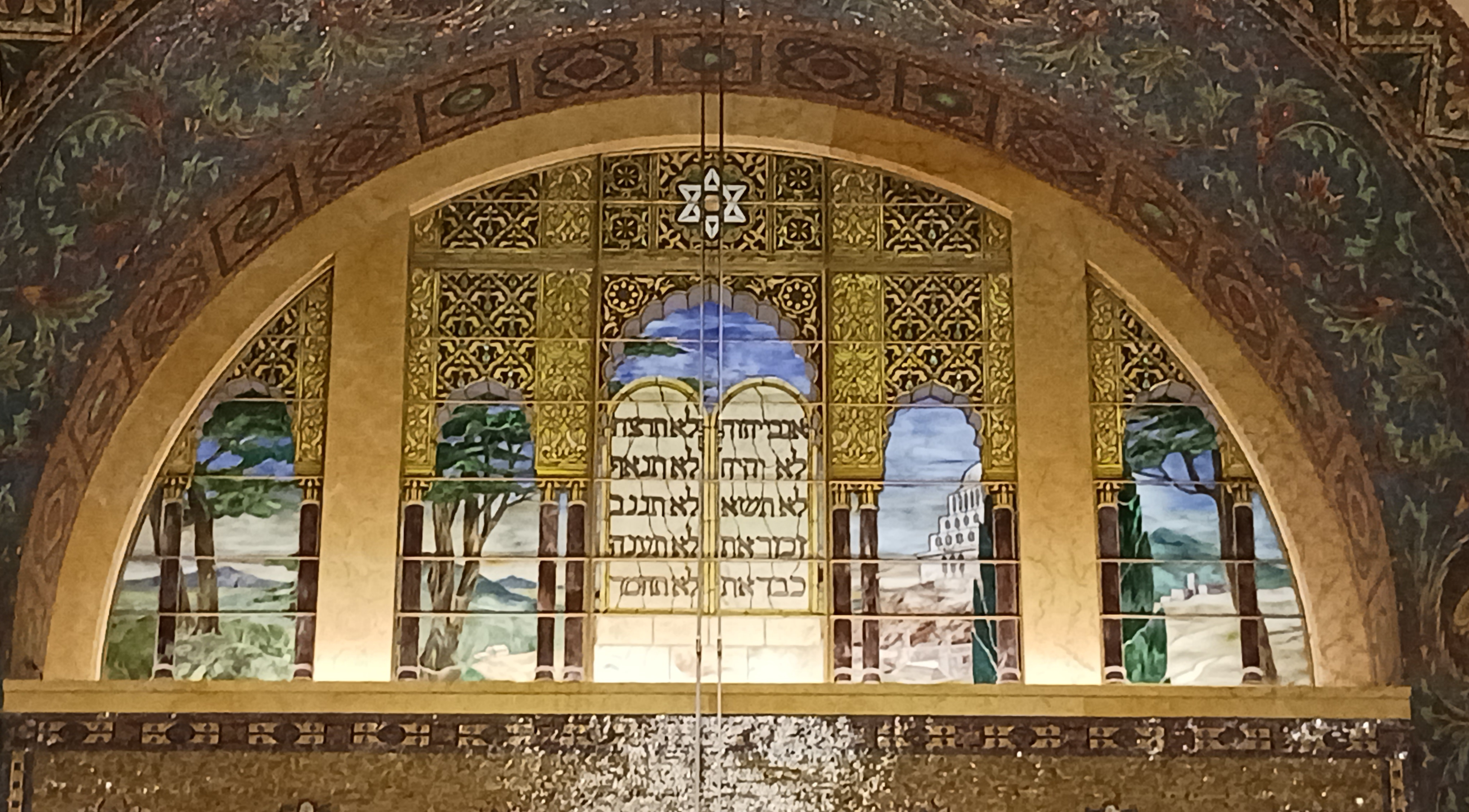
Stained glass windows designed by Louis Comfort Tiffany for the 1868 Temple Emanu-El; now installed in the current building's chapel

Congregation Emanu-El has occupied five buildings throughout its history:

- Temple Emanu-El (New York, 1847)
- Temple Emanu-El (New York, 1854)
- Temple Emanu-El (New York, 1868)
- Temple Beth-El (New York City)
- Temple Emanu-El of New York (1930)

The current building at Fifth Avenue and 65th Street was built between 1928 and 1929 and consecrated in 1930.

== Notable members and funerals ==
- Benjamin Altheimer
- Charles Benenson
- Robert A. Bernhard
- Dorothy Lehman Bernhard
- Milton H. Biow
- Leon Black
- Harvey R. Blau
- Paul Block
- Michael Bloomberg
- Lyman Bloomingdale
- Samuel Bloomingdale
- Nathan Burkan
- Benjamin Buttenwieser
- Barbaralee Diamonstein-Spielvogel
- Simon M. Ehrlich
- Lee K. Frankel
- Alfred Frankenthaler
- Charles Frohman
- Bernard Gimbel
- Alan "Ace" Greenberg
- Joseph B. Greenhut
- David M. Heyman
- Martin Kimmel
- Ed Koch
- Alfred J. Koeppel
- Andrew Lack
- Edgar J. Lauer
- Abraham E. Lefcourt
- Adele Lewisohn Lehman
- Herbert H. Lehman
- Irving Lehman
- Samuel D. Levy
- Walter Lippmann
- Solomon Loeb
- Louis Marshall
- Paul McCartney
- Bernard H. Mendik
- William A. Moses
- Adolph Ochs
- Milton Petrie
- Victor Potamkin
- Joan Rivers
- Chester H. Roth
- Simon F. Rothschild
- Frank Russek
- Mel Sachs
- David Sarnoff
- Jesse Seligman
- Jacob Schiff
- M. Lincoln Schuster
- Sime Silverman
- Carl Spielvogel
- Eliot Spitzer
- Alfred Steckler
- Oscar S. Straus
- Lewis L. Strauss
- Sarah Lavanburg Straus
- Kay Thompson
- Harold Uris
- Felix M. Warburg
- Frieda Schiff Warburg
- Paul F. Warburg
- Jeff Zucker
