= Naomi Gleit =

American technology executive

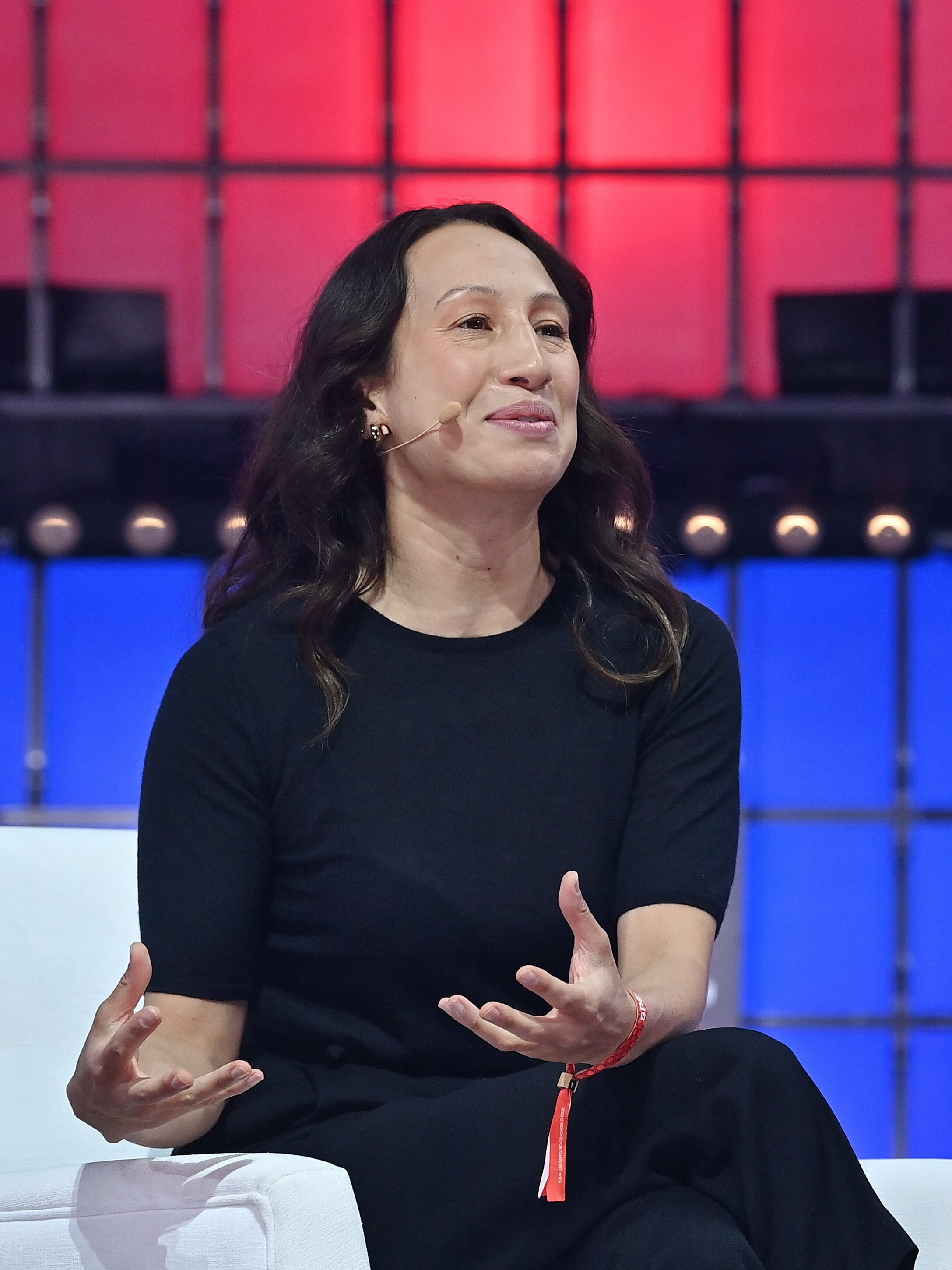
- Naomi Gleit in 2022
- Education: Stanford University (BA)
- Title: Head of product at Meta Platforms

Naomi Gleit is head of product at Meta, formerly Facebook. She was previously the vice president of social good, growth, engagement, and identity at the company. She has been identified as Meta's longest-serving employee after CEO Mark Zuckerberg, having been at the company from July 18, 2005 to present.

== Early life and education ==
Gleit was born to an Asian-American mother and a Jewish father and was raised in New York City. She described her mother as a "tiger mom" who ferried her to ballet, piano, karate and Chinese lessons. Her father was an immigration lawyer by profession who took her to Hebrew school growing up. Gleit has spoken extensively about how her identity as a half-Asian, half-Jewish woman has shaped her life, stating that:

"I have permission to say what is true for me: I am not half, I am whole. I identify with my mom and my dad, and instead of being half of each, I am fully both."

Gleit majored in Science, Technology, and Society at Stanford University, where she wrote her senior thesis on Facebook, and how it beat out rival social networking service Club Nexus at Stanford University (the creator of Club Nexus would later go on to create Orkut).

== Career ==
Gleit has spent her entire career at Meta.

After writing her senior thesis about Facebook, Gleit was bullish on Facebook's potential and applied to work there. She began work as a marketing associate and helping with administrative duties on July 18, 2005, which was also her birthday. She came on board shortly after the company had hit 1 million users. In her role, Gleit promoted Facebook beyond colleges and to high schools, facilitating the eventual opening up of Facebook to all users.

In 2007, Zuckerberg asked Gleit to become a product manager for the growth team, and she accepted. The growth team was led by Chamath Palihapitiya. In 2009, Gleit, describing her job to Newsweek, said "My job isn't done until literally everyone in the world is on the site."

Gleit was part of the team that worked on and released Facebook Safety Check in 2014, inspired by people's use of social media to connect with friends and family in the wake of the 2011 Tōhoku earthquake and tsunami. Putting this initiative in a broader context, Gleit later told Fast Company: "[Zuckerberg] wants us to take this data-driven, product-driven approach and apply that to other problems because it’s not unique, per se, to growth." As of 2017, Gleit continued to be in charge of Facebook Safety Check.

At the Social Good Summit in New York City on September 27, 2015, Gleit announced that Facebook was creating a team dedicated to social good. Gleit's title changed to vice president for social good.

Under Gleit's leadership, Facebook, in 2016 and 2017, rolled out support for Fundraisers, including nonprofits fundraising for themselves, as well as individuals setting up fundraisers for personal causes and nonprofits they want to support. Gleit also led Facebook's efforts to team up with other social good efforts, such as Chimehack, a partnership with Gucci and Global Citizen. In 2024, Gold House recognized her as one of the most impactful Asians.

Gleit subsequently became head of product at Facebook, which had rebranded to Meta in 2021.

Gleit serves on the board of The Primary School, serving children and their families in East Palo Alto.
