= Sonnenschein =

Sonnenschein is a German surname meaning 'sunshine' and may refer to:

- Carl Sonnenschein (1876–1929), German priest and social activist
- Carlos Alberto Sonnenschein (born 1961), Bolivian politician
- Edward Adolf Sonnenschein (1851–1929), English Classical Scholar and writer on Latin grammar and verse
- Franz Leopold Sonnenschein (1817–1879), German chemist
- Hugo Sonnenschein (1889–1953), Austrian writer
- Hugo F. Sonnenschein (born 1940), American economist
- Jannah Sonnenschein (born 1996), Dutch–Mozambican swimmer
- Rosa Sonnenschein (1847–1932), Austria-Hungary-born American founder and editor of The American Jewess
- William Swan Sonnenschein (1855–1934), English publisher
- William Teulon Swan Sonnenschein (1883–1948), barrister, Principal of Brasenose College, Vice-Chancellor of the University of Oxford

== See also ==
- Sonnenschein Nath & Rosenthal, an international law firm
- Solomon H. Sonneschein, Hungarian-American rabbi
- "Wochenend und Sonnenschein", a song with German lyrics
- Sunshine (1999 film), a 1999 film about members of Sonnenschein family of Budapest
