= Ferdinand M. Isserman =

American Reform rabbi and interfaith activist (1898–1972)

- Born: Ferdinand Myron Isserman; March 4, 1898; Antwerp, Belgium
- Died: March 7, 1972 (aged 74); St. Louis, Missouri, U.S.
- Resting place: New Mount Sinai Cemetery, Affton, Missouri
- Citizenship: United States (naturalized 1918)
- Education: Hebrew Union College (B.H.L., 1917; ordination, 1922); University of Cincinnati (B.A., 1919); University of Pennsylvania (M.A., 1924)
- Occupation: Rabbi
- Years active: 1922–1966
- Spouse: Ruth J. Frankenstein (m. 1923)
- Children: 2
- Relatives: Abraham J. Isserman (brother)

Ferdinand Myron Isserman (March 4, 1898 – March 7, 1972) was a Belgian-born American Reform rabbi who served as senior rabbi of Congregation Temple Israel in St. Louis, Missouri, from 1929 to 1963. He traveled to Nazi Germany three times during the 1930s and published early warnings about the persecution of German Jews. In Canada, he organized what has been described as the first pulpit exchange between a rabbi and a Christian minister in the British Empire. He served with the American Red Cross in North Africa during World War II and was involved in the civil rights movement and interfaith work in St. Louis for over three decades.

== Early life and education ==
Isserman was born on March 4, 1898, in Antwerp, Belgium, to Alexander and Bettl (Brodheim) Isserman. His family immigrated to the United States in 1906 and settled in Newark, New Jersey, where he attended public schools. He graduated from Central High School in June 1914. He became a naturalized citizen in 1918. His brother Abraham J. Isserman became a lawyer who defended Communist Party leaders in the Smith Act trial of 1949.

Isserman enrolled at Hebrew Union College (HUC) in Cincinnati in September 1914. He received a Bachelor of Hebrew Letters in 1917 and rabbinical ordination in June 1922. He earned a Bachelor of Arts from the University of Cincinnati in 1919, where he lettered in basketball. He served as president of the HUC student body in 1921–22. During World War I, he volunteered for the United States Army infantry despite holding an exemption as a theology student. He later received a Master of Arts from the University of Pennsylvania in 1924 and undertook postgraduate studies at the University of Toronto (1926–27) and the University of Chicago (1928).

== Career ==
=== Toronto and early interfaith work ===
Isserman began his career as assistant rabbi at Rodeph Shalom Congregation in Philadelphia (1922–1925) under Rabbi Harry W. Ettelson. In 1925, he was called to Holy Blossom Temple in Toronto, where he served until 1929.

In Toronto, Isserman organized what has been described as the first pulpit exchange between a rabbi and a Christian minister in the British Empire. He also arranged the first goodwill dinner among Catholics, Protestants, and Jews in Canadian history and the first interdenominational Armistice Day service in Toronto. He inaugurated Sunday services at Holy Blossom Temple and led a campaign against corporal punishment in the city's public schools.

=== Congregation Temple Israel, St. Louis ===
In 1929, Isserman succeeded the late Leon Harrison as rabbi of Congregation Temple Israel in St. Louis. He held the position for over 34 years, serving as senior rabbi until 1963 and in an emeritus capacity thereafter.

Beginning in 1932, Isserman conducted weekly Jewish programs on radio station KSK on Sunday mornings, broadcasting for approximately 30 years. He initiated an annual Institute on Judaism for the Christian Clergy (1937–1962), at which Christian ministers attended lectures by Jewish scholars at the temple. Together with Episcopal Bishop William Scarlett and Methodist Bishop Ivan Lee Holt, he co-founded the Social Justice Commission of St. Louis (1930–1935). He founded the first St. Louis chapter of the National Conference of Christians and Jews.

In 1942, on the tenth anniversary of Bishop Scarlett's consecration, Isserman arranged for Temple Israel to present hand-carved oak baptistry doors inscribed with Deuteronomy 6:5 in Hebrew and English to Christ Church Cathedral. In November 1962, Christ Church reciprocated with a sculpture by Robert Cronbach depicting Noah's rainbow.

=== Trips to Nazi Germany ===
Isserman traveled to Nazi Germany three times, in 1933, 1935, and 1937, to observe the persecution of Jews firsthand.

In the summer of 1933, as chairman of the American section of the World Union for Progressive Judaism, Isserman spent a month in the Third Reich. He returned to publish Sentenced to Death! The Jews in Nazi Germany (1933), a pamphlet that warned of the Nazi government's aim to destroy German Jewry. The pamphlet is held by the St. Louis Kaplan Feldman Holocaust Museum.

His 1935 return trip was undertaken without a visa; according to a Missouri S&T research guide, he created false trails to avoid detection. He made a third visit in 1937 and delivered a sermon about his observations. During his visits, he consulted with Leo Baeck, the leader of German Jewry. Upon returning, he spoke at United Jewish Appeal fundraising rallies across the country.

=== World War II service ===
During World War II, Isserman took a leave of absence from Temple Israel to serve as a field director with the American Red Cross during the Tunisian campaign with the First Armored Division in 1943. He conducted Passover services for American Jewish soldiers at the Red Cross club in Algiers. He received citations from the U.S. Treasury Department and the American Red Cross for his service. He later attended the Nuremberg trials. His wartime experiences formed the basis of his 1958 book A Rabbi with the American Red Cross.

=== Civil rights activism ===
Isserman was an advocate for racial equality in St. Louis. He served as chairman of the Inter-Racial Commission of the Synagogue Council of America and sat on the board of the Urban League of St. Louis. As chairman of the Central Conference of American Rabbis (CCAR) Commission on Justice and Peace (1942–1945), he organized the Institute on Judaism and Race Relations in 1945.

He worked to establish an inter-racial nursery in Missouri. The Nursery Foundation of St. Louis was admitted to the St. Louis Community Chest in February 1951, and the nursery at 1218 N. Euclid was dedicated in February 1952. He regularly invited NAACP speakers to address Temple Israel's confirmation classes.

In 1968, Isserman received the Distinguished Public Service Award from the St. Louis Argus, St. Louis's African-American newspaper.

=== Congregation Temple Israel v. City of Creve Coeur ===
When Temple Israel sought to relocate to suburban Creve Coeur in the 1950s, the city attempted to block construction through zoning amendments. The congregation had purchased a 23.66-acre tract on April 28, 1954; two weeks later, a petition was filed to amend the zoning ordinance to prevent the synagogue from being built.

The Supreme Court of Missouri ruled on January 12, 1959, that Missouri's zoning laws did not authorize municipalities to exclude churches or schools from residential districts. The decision was cited as precedent in 2007, when members of Temple Israel assisted the Islamic Community Center of St. Louis in a similar zoning dispute.

=== Later career ===
After stepping down from Temple Israel's active pulpit in 1963, Isserman served as guest rabbi for the Jewish community of Hong Kong (1963–1964) and as Jewish chaplain and assistant professor of religion at the University of the Seven Seas (1964–1965), a floating university.

== Personal life and death ==
On June 6, 1923, Isserman married Ruth J. Frankenstein. They had two children: a daughter, Irma (Mrs. Stanley Gertz), and a son, Ferdinand Myron Isserman Jr.

Isserman died on March 7, 1972, three days after his 74th birthday.

== Legacy ==
The Rabbi Ferdinand M. Isserman Memorial Lecture was established at Washington University in St. Louis in 1972, with the inaugural lecture delivered in 1973 by former United States Attorney General Ramsey Clark. In 1992, his widow and children established the Rabbi Ferdinand M. Isserman Prize at Washington University, awarded annually to a student contributing to interfaith activities.

His papers are held at the Jacob Rader Marcus Center of the American Jewish Archives in Cincinnati as the Ferdinand M. Isserman Papers (MS-0006), spanning 1870–1971. Notable correspondents in the collection include Albert Einstein and Senator Thomas Eagleton.

== Honours and awards ==
- Doctor of Laws (honorary), Douglass University, 1941
- Doctor of Divinity (honorary), Central College, 1945
- Doctor of Hebrew Letters (honorary), Hebrew Union College, 1950
- Regional Clergyman of the Year, Religious Heritage of America, 1967
- Distinguished Public Service Award, St. Louis Argus, 1968

== Selected works ==
- Sentenced to Death: The Jews in Nazi Germany (1933; revised edition, 1961)
- Rebels and Saints: The Social Message of the Prophets of Israel (Bethany Press, 1933)
- This Is Judaism (Willett, Clark & Company, 1944)
- The Jewish Jesus and the Christian Christ (1950; reprinted 1956)
- A Rabbi with the American Red Cross (1958)
