= Congregation Shaare Emeth =

Reform synagogue in Creve Coeur, Missouri, United States

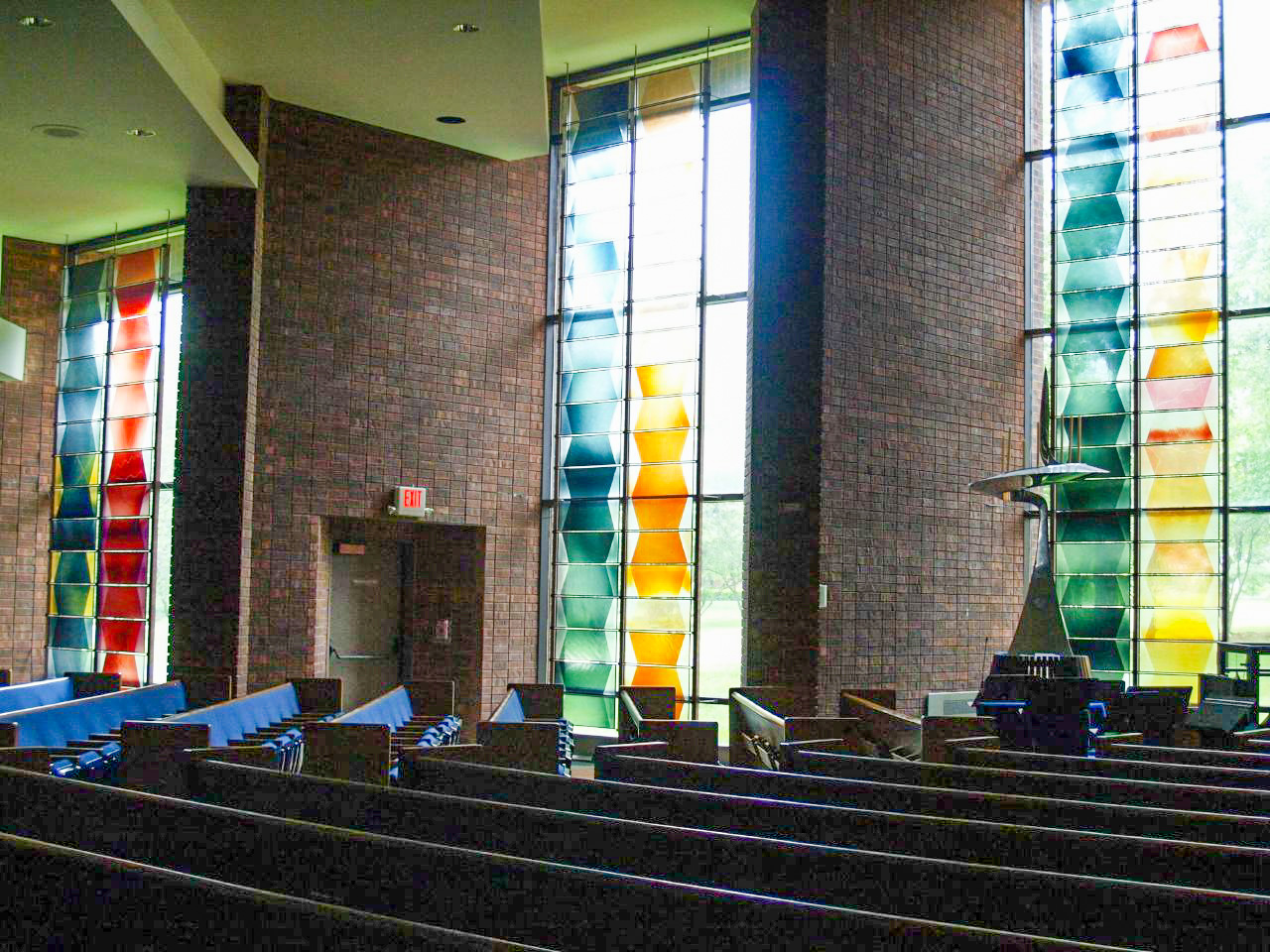
- Interior of the synagogue, in 2007

- Location in Missouri

Religion
- Affiliation: Reform Judaism
- Ecclesiastical or organizational status: Synagogue
- Leadership: Rabbi Jim Bennett; Rabbi Andrea Goldstein; Rabbi Rachel Bearman; Rabbi Lori Levine (Education); Rabbi Jeffrey Stiffman (Emeritus)
- Status: Active

Location
- Location: 11645 Ladue Road, Creve Coeur, St. Louis County, Missouri 63141
- Country: United States
- Interactive map of Congregation Shaare Emeth
- Coordinates: 38°39′23″N 90°26′28″W

Architecture
- Type: Synagogue
- Established: 1867 (as a congregation)
- Completed: 1869 (17th and Pine Sts.); 1897 (Lindell Street); 1934 (University City); 1980 (Creve Coeur)

Website
- sestl.org

Congregation Shaare Emeth (transliterated from Hebrew as "Gates of Truth") is a Reform Jewish congregation and synagogue located at 11645 Ladue Road, in Creve Coeur, St. Louis County, Missouri, in the United States.

== History ==
Founded in St. Louis in 1867, out of the Orthodox B’nai El congregation, Shaare Emeth constructed its first synagogue building at 17th and Pine Streets in 1869, designed by Thomas Brady and Otto H. Stickel in the Moorish Revival style, with tow onion domes. Rabbi Solomon H. Sonneschein was the congregation's first rabbi, who later went on to be founding rabbi at Congregation Temple Israel.

The 1869 synagogue was replaced by the Richardsonian Romanesque-style building designed by Link, Rosenheim, and Ittner, completed in 1897. With seating for 1,000 worshippers, the building was notable due to its 25-square-foot (2.3 m^{2}) tower, some 140 feet (43 m) high. Alfred S. Alschuler of Chicago designed the congregation's third synagogue, located in University City, completed in 1934. In 1980, the congregation moved to Creve Coeur.

Shaare Emeth is a member of the Union for Reform Judaism. It is the oldest Reform and largest congregation in the greater St. Louis area. In addition to religious services, the Shaare Emeth has a religious school, Shirlee Green Preschool, and two summer camps, Camp Micah and Camp Emeth. In 2016, the former Orthodox B’nai El and the Reform Shaare Emeth congregations merged.

Clergy include Senior Rabbi Jim Bennett, Rabbi Andrea Goldstein, Rabbi Rachel Bearman, Cantor Seth Warner, and Rabbi Educator Lori Levine; and Rabbi Emeritus is Jeffrey Stiffman.

== Notable members ==
- Rosa Sonneschein, rebbetzin, editor, and activist for female synagogal rights
- Solomon H. Sonneschein, founding and controversial rabbi
