= Leon Harrison =

English-born American rabbi

Dr. Leon Harrison
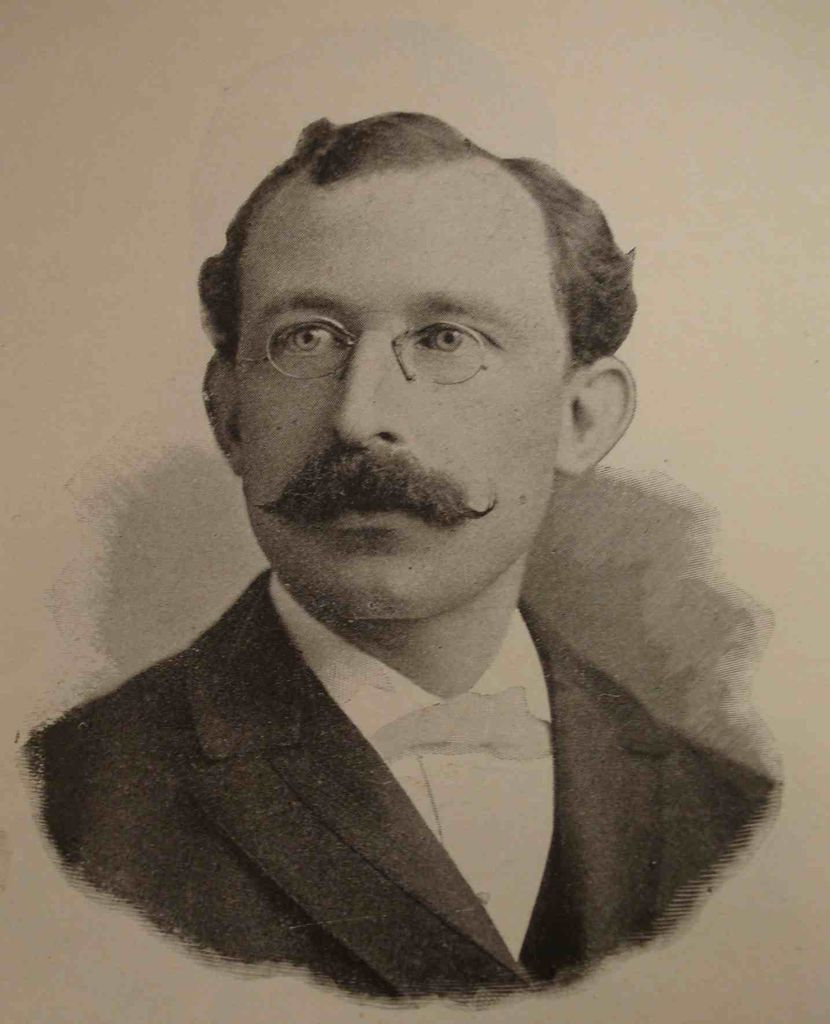
- Born: August 13, 1886; Liverpool, England
- Died: November 1, 1928 (aged 42); New York City, United States
- Resting place: New Mount Sinai Cemetery
- Occupation: Rabbi
- Employer: Temple Israel of St. Louis

Leon Harrison (August 13, 1866 – September 1, 1928) was an English-born American rabbi who led Temple Israel of St. Louis from 1891 until his death in 1928.

== Early life and education ==
Harrison was born on August 13, 1866, in Liverpool, England, the son of Gustave and Louisa (né Nelson) Harrison. Harrison's siblings included his brother Abraham Harrison and sister Theresa Goldman.

Harrison attended the St. James School in Liverpool. He immigrated to America when he was young. In 1880, he was admitted to New York City College at the head of 920 candidates, ranking above every other student. In 1882, he continued his studies at Columbia University, where he graduated with a B.A. and first honors of his class in 1886. He then spent three years doing postgraduate study in philosophy at Columbia. In 1886, he graduated from the Emanu-El Theological Seminary in New York City and was ordained a rabbi by Rabbi Kaufmann Kohler and Rabbi Gustav Gottheil.

== Career ==
Harrison then began serving as rabbi of Temple Israel in Brooklyn when he was twenty, making him one of the youngest rabbis in America at the time. As Temple Israel's rabbi for the next five years, he helped grow the small synagogue into one of the leading congregations in Brooklyn and get a new temple building built. At 21 years old, Harrison gave a eulogy at Henry Ward Beecher's funeral service in Brooklyn.

In 1890, he was invited to deliver a sermon at Temple Israel in St. Louis, Missouri. This led the Temple, which at the time was trying to fill a vacancy caused by the resignation of Rabbi Solomon H. Sonneschein, to unanimously name him their new rabbi over 27 other candidates. He moved to St. Louis and began working as Temple Israel's rabbi in 1891.

In St. Louis, Harrison was deeply involved in social reform movements. He was vice-president of the Anti-Tuberculosis Society, director of the Tenement House Improvement Association, a founder of the Sisterhood of Personal Service, Social Settlement League, and the Fresh Air Society in St. Louis. He also served as co-editor of the Semitics section of the Editor's Encyclopedia.

At Temple Israel introduced Sunday services—as opposed to the common Saturday sabbath service. From his pulpit he delivered sermons that would be syndicated in newspapers monthly. He also delivered a memorial address for William McKinley in St. Louis, and delivered the Thanksgiving oration as a representative of the Jewish community in the 1904 Louisiana Purchase Exposition.

== Death and legacy ==
On September 1, 1928, Harrison fell in front of a subway car at the 116th Street–Columbia University station in New York City. He had returned from a European trip a week earlier and was staying with his sister. The death was initially considered a suicide but was later ruled an accident.

A funeral service was held at Temple Israel in New York City, where Rabbi Samuel Thurman of the United Hebrew Congregation in St. Louis, Rabbi Maximilian Heller of Temple Sinai in New Orleans, and Rabbi Simon Cohen of Union Temple of Brooklyn officiated the service and delivered eulogies. The funeral was attended by prominent members of the New York City Jewish community and representatives of his St. Louis congregation, including Rabbi Samuel Schulman of Congregation Emanu-El, Rabbi Nathan Stern of the West End Synagogue, Rabbi Aaron Eiseman of Mt. Neboh Congregation, Rabbi A. B. Tintner of Unity Congregation, Rabbi Clifton H. Levy of the Jewish Science Congregation, and Rabbi Irving Reichert of Tremont Temple. Following the funeral service, Harrison's body was brought to Pennsylvania Station, where a train brought it back to St. Louis accompanied by congregants.

Harrison's body lie in state prior to another funeral service in St. Louis, and burial in New Mount Sinai Cemetery.

In 1931, his sermons were posthumously published in a volume called The Religion of a Modern Liberal.
