= Benjamin Altheimer =

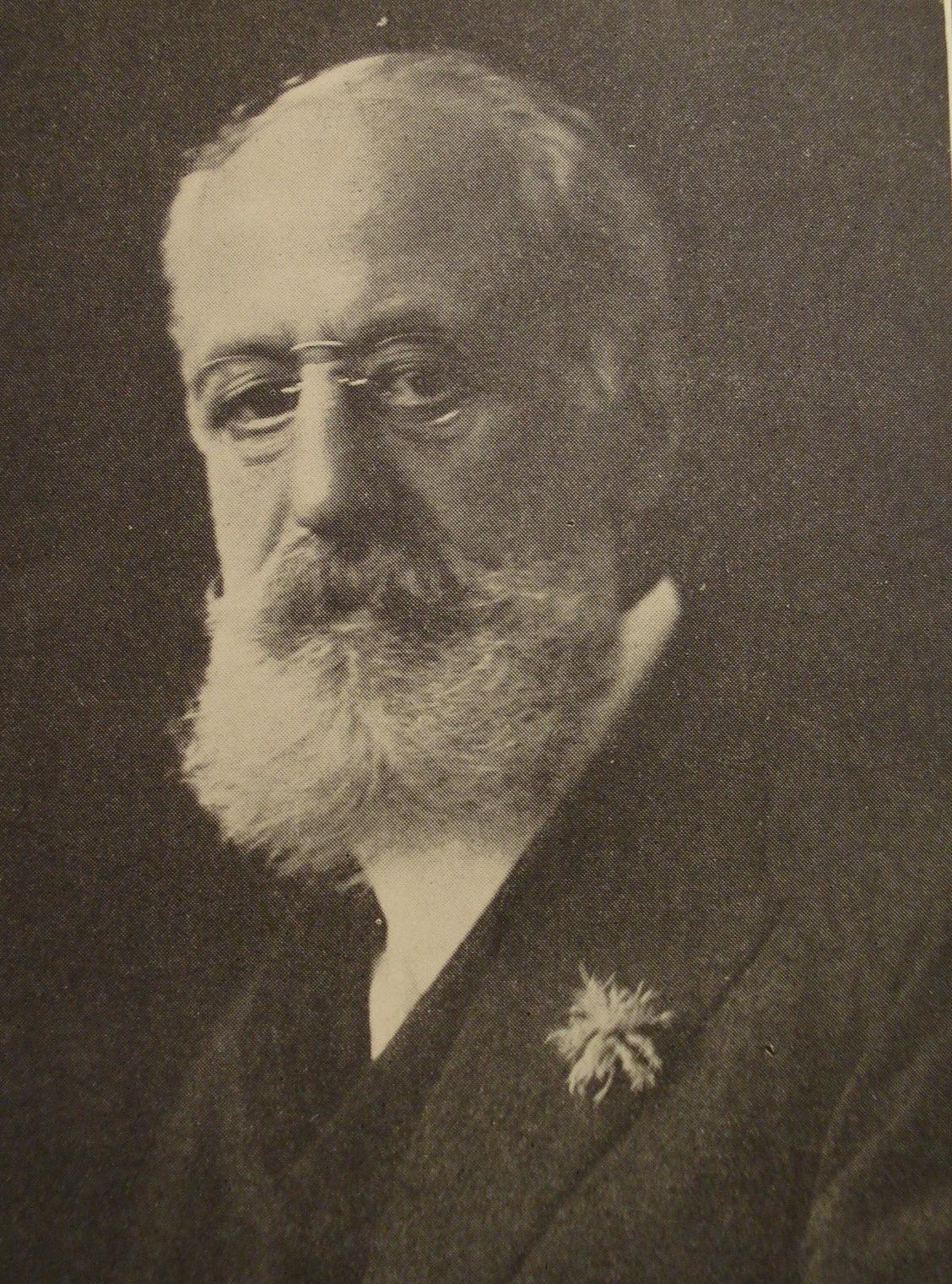
Benjamin Altheimer

Benjamin Altheimer (March 6, 1850 – April 30, 1938), was a German-born Jewish-American banker and philanthropist.

== Life ==
Altheimer was born on March 6, 1850, in Darmstadt, the Grand Duchy of Hesse, the son of Moses Altheimer and Salome Loew.

Altheimer attended the Reinhardt Institute and the Darmstadt Realschule, after which he received private instruction in mathematics and languages at Darmstadt and Frankfurt. In 1868, he immigrated to America and worked as a cotton merchant in Forest City and Memphis, Tennessee. He lived there for some time, after which he returned to Germany and lived there for a year. He then returned to America and moved to St. Louis in 1874. There, he became an investment banker and established the Altheimer & Rawlings Investment Co., which he was president of. In 1916, when his business partner died, he sold his bank, retired from the business, and moved to New York City. He lived there for the rest of his life.

In 1918, Altheimer proposed the institution of Flag Day to President Woodrow Wilson, who declared it a national holiday shortly afterwards. On the 150th anniversary of the adoption of the American flag two years later, the American Flag Association awarded him with the Cross of Honor. During the great blizzard of 1912, he introduced the Emergency Relief Association and Bundle Day, which were credited in successfully clothing the poor. The Emergency Relief Association later became a permanent body. During the yellow fever epidemic in the South, he called for the first meeting for the relief of victims of the disease and was appointed by the mayor of St. Louis to a three-person commission to take charge of the movement. He was also an organizer of the Missouri Charity Week, a director of the Cleveland Jewish Orphanage, a co-founder and treasurer of the National Jewish Hospital for Consumptives, and a co-founder and chairman of the Pretorius Memorial Library of Washington University in St. Louis.

While living in St. Louis, Altheimer was a founder and trustee of Temple Israel, president of the YMHA, a director of the United Jewish Charities, and vice-chairman of the Mt. Rose Roman Catholic Hospital. In New York City, he served as a treasurer and honorary life trustee of the New York executive committee of the Union of American Hebrew Congregations, an American Jewish committee member of the Synagogue Council of America, and a member of the Federation of Jewish Charities of New York City and the Karl Schurz Praetorius Association. On his 80th birthday, his friends gave him a $30,000 check to establish the Ben Altheimer Fund for the National Jewish Hospital and its research work (to which he gave an additional $5,000). On his 85th birthday, his friends raised an additional $40,000 for the fund. For his work in establishing Bundle Day, he was presented with a loving cup by John J. Glennon, the Archbishop of St. Louis, who referred to him on that occasion as the "Napoleon of charity." For his work in connection to Flag Day, he was made an honorary member of Jewish War Veterans. He also wrote poetry and contributed articles to various magazines on Jewish and religious topics.

Altheimer was a member of the Freemasons, the Harmonie Club, the Midday Club of New York City, the Noonday, Columbian and Town and Gown clubs of St. Louis, the Glen Echo Country Club, and the West Wood Country Club. Politically, he was a Republican. He was president of Temple Beth-El in New York City. When that congregation merged with Congregation Emanu-El, he became the latter congregation's vice-president, an honorary life trustee, and, following Louis Marshall's death in 1929, acting president. In 1880, he married Jenny Eisenstadt, daughter of St. Louis jewelry manufacturer Michael Eisenstadt. They had one daughter, Selma, who married Arthur William Weil.

Altheimer died at home from colon cancer on April 30, 1938. He was buried in New Mount Sinai Cemetery in St. Louis.
