= Albert Stern =

Albert Stern may refer to:

- Albert Stern (rabbi) (1826–1888), Hungarian rabbi
- Albert Stern (violinist), American violinist
- Albert Gerald Stern (1878–1966), British banker and secretary of the Landships Committee responsible for developing the first British tanks
