= Bertha Schaefer =

American artist and designer

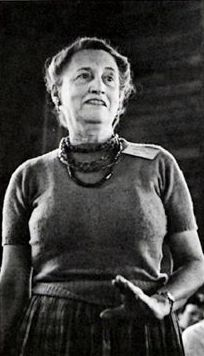
- Born: 1895; Yazoo City, Mississippi, U.S.
- Died: May 24, 1971 (aged 75–76); New York City, U.S.
- Known for: Design

Bertha Schaefer (1895–1971) was an American designer and gallery director, she was known for her furniture designs, and as an interior designer.

== Biography ==
Schaefer was born in Yazoo City, Mississippi in 1895. Her father Emil Schaefer was a refugee from Germany and worked as a board of trustees for a public school. She attended Mississippi State College for Women and Parsons School of Design. She briefly traveled to Paris after graduation from school and after she returned to New York City to work with interior designer Helen Criss for a few months. Schaefer died in New York City on May 24, 1971. Her paper are in the Archives of American Art at the Smithsonian Institution. The Sheldon Museum of Art was the recipient of paintings, prints, sculpture, and ceramics from her estate.

== Design ==
In 1924 Schaefer founded Bertha Schaefer Interiors. Her company designed Bauhaus-inspired furniture and interiors for both residences and businesses. In 1952 Schaefer's work was included in MoMA's exhibition Good Design. The same year she won a design award from MoMA. From 1950 through 1961 Schaefer designed furniture for M. Singer and Sons Furniture Company. Schaefer was a member of the Decorators Club of New York, serving two terms as president and, in 1959, receiving their design award.

== Gallery ==
In 1944 Schaefer founded the Bertha Schaefer Gallery of Contemporary Art in New York City, which exhibited contemporary American and European painting and sculpture. The gallery represented Will Barnet, William Clutz, Robert Cronbach, Elisabeth Frink, Terry Frost, Patrick Heron, Morris Kantor, Joseph Konzal, Charles Green Shaw, Raymond Rocklin, Joop Sanders, John von Wicht, and Irwin Rubin. They also exhibited works by Eric Beynon, Manuel Felguerez, Zvi Gali, María Luisa Pacheco, Mimmo Rotella, Eusebio Sempere, Glen Michaels, Sheldon Machlin, and Karin Van Leyden. In the early 1960s, the gallery presented group exhibitions that focused on young, international artists working with hybrid forms between painting and sculpture, such as "Six Techniques: Six Nationalities" (September–October 1960), and "The Wall" (January 1962). Examples include “Relieve Luminoso Movil," electrically illuminated, plastic reliefs by Spanish artist, Eusebio Sempere, as well as carved, colorfully painted wood constructions by New York based Irwin Rubin.

In 1972, following Schaefer's death, the gallery was renamed the New Bertha Schaefer Gallery.
