= Hirsch Bär Fassel =

Rabbi

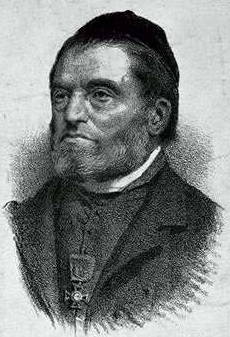
Hirsch Bär Fassel

Hirsch Bär Fassel (21 August 1802 – 27 December 1883; also known as Hirsch Baer Fassel or Hirsch B. Fassel) was an influential rabbi and philosopher.

== Biography ==
He was born in Boskovice. His book Mozene Zedek, a manual for rabbis on Talmudic decisions on practical matters, urged other rabbis to be lenient in making rulings against individuals in non-criminal matters. Fassel believed that reforms in Judaism were legitimate, so long as they were brought about by rabbis. He preached in German and allowed the consumption of kitniyot during Passover. He served as the rabbi of Prostějov until 1851 and then in Nagykanizsa until his death in 1883.

Hirsch was a prolific writer who often had his sermons published in the Jewish press, and who was a frequent contributor to Austrian Jewish newspapers. In addition to Mozene Zedek, he wrote and published at least a dozen other books.

His manuscript of Mozene Zedek is on display at the Hebrew Union College.

His daughter Rosa Sonneschein was the founder of the American Jewess.

== Books ==
- Mozene Zedek
- Zwei Gottesdienstliche Vorträge, Gehalten in der Synagoge zu Prossnitz
- Ḥoreb Beẓayon: Briefe eines Jüdischen Gelehrten und Rabbinen über das Werk "Ḥoreb" von S. R. Hirsch
- Reis- und Hülsenfrüchte am Pesach Erlaubte Speisen
- Ein Wort zur Zeit beim Dankfeste für die Errungenschaft der Freiheit
- Ẓedeḳ u-Mishpaṭ, Tugend- und Rechtslehre, Bearbeitet nach den Principien des Talmuds und nach der Form der Philosophie
- Die Epidemie: Trauer- und Gedenkrede
- Mishpeṭe El: das Mosaisch-Rabbinische Civilrecht, Bearbeitet nach Anordnung und Eintheilung der Gerichtsordnungen der Neuzeit und Erläutert mit Angabe der Quellen.
- Ḳol Adonai: die Zehn Worte des Bundes
- 'Asot Mishpaṭ: das Mosaisch-Rabbinische Gerichtsverfahren in Civilrechtlichen Sachen, Bearbeitet nach Anordnung und Eintheilung der Gerichtsordnungen der Neuzeit und Erläutert mit Angabe der Quellen
- Dat Mosheh we-Yisrael: die Mosaisch-Rabbinische Religionslehre, Katechetisch für den Unterricht Bearbeitet.
- Dibre Elohim Ḥay, Neun Derusch-Vorträge
- We-Shafeṭu we-Hiẓẓilu: das Mosaisch-Rabbinische Strafrecht und Strafrechtliche Gerichtsverfahren, Bearbeitet nach Anordnung und Eintheilung der Gesetzbücher der Neuzeit und Erläutert mit Angabe der Quellen
