= Congregation Temple Israel (Creve Coeur, Missouri) =

Reform synagogue in Creve Coeur, Missouri, United States

- Location of the current synagogue in greater St. Louis, Missouri

Religion
- Affiliation: Reform Judaism
- Ecclesiastical or organisational status: Synagogue
- Leadership: Rabbi Amy Feder; Rabbi Michael Alper; Rabbi Mark L. Shook (Emeritus)
- Status: Active
- Notable artworks by: Rodney Winfield; Robert Cronbach

Location
- Location: 1 Rabbi Alvan D. Rubin Drive, Creve Coeur, St. Louis County, Missouri 63141
- Country: United States
- Coordinates: 38°37′36″N 90°25′10″W

Architecture
- Architects: Gyo Obata (Hellmuth, Obata, and Kassabaum)
- Type: Synagogue
- Style: Modernist
- Established: 1886 (as a congregation)
- Completed: 1888 (28th and Pine Sts.); 1907 (Washington Ave); 1962 (Creve Coeur)

Specifications
- Capacity: 2,200 worshippers
- Site area: 24 acres (9.7 ha)

Website
- ti-stl.org
- Temple Israel (1907)
- U.S. Historic district – Contributing property
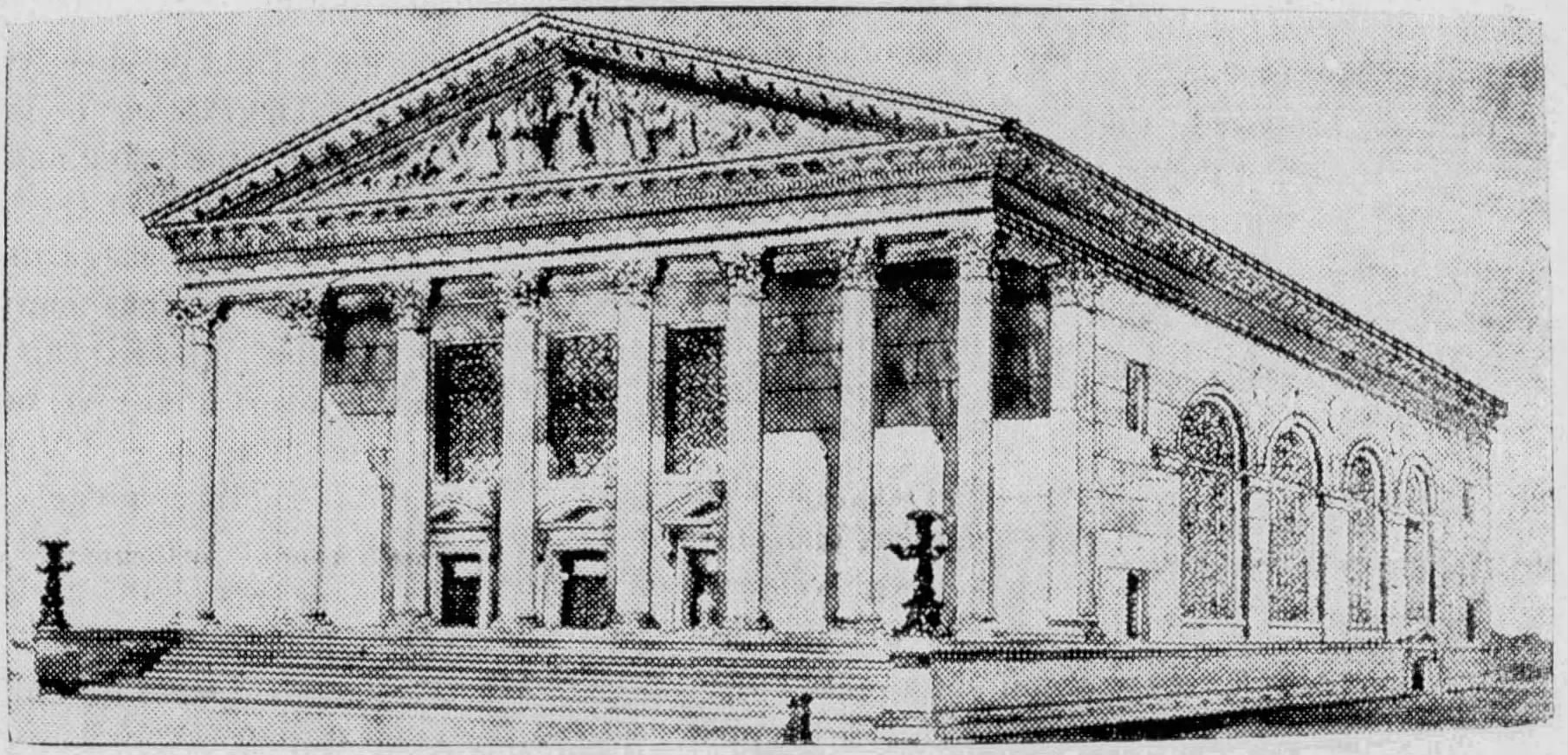
- Temple Israel second synagogue, built in 1907

- Location within St. Louis
- Location: 5001 Washington Avenue, St. Louis, Missouri
- Coordinates: 38°38′57″N 90°15′52″W
- Built: 1907
- Architectural style: Romanesque Revival
- Part of: Holy Corners Historic District (ID75002138)
- Added to NRHP: December 29, 1975

Congregation Temple Israel is a Reform Jewish synagogue located at 1 Rabbi Alvan D. Rubin Drive, in Creve Coeur, St. Louis County, Missouri, in the United States. Constructing three different synagogue buildings during its history, the second synagogue, built in 1907, is a contributing property to the National Register of Historic Places-listing for the Holy Corners Historic District in the center of St. Louis.

== History ==
Temple Israel's founders differed in opinion from the leadership of Shaare Emeth, favoring the more liberal political and theological view point that was sweeping parts of Europe and the United States at the time. One of these founders was Rabbi Solomon H. Sonneschein, who became Temple Israel's first rabbi. During the first year of operation (1886), Temple Israel had between 60 and 70 members and 604 persons attended the first Erev Rosh Hashanah services.

The first Temple Israel building, a stone temple located off 28th and Pine Street, was completed in 1888, designed by Grable and Weber in the Richardsonian Romanesque style. As Temple Israel's membership grew, the downtown location became inconvenient, and so a lot was purchased on Kingshighway and Washington Boulevards. The second synagogue was located at 5001 Washington Avenue, completed in the Romanesque Revival style in 1907. In 1931, Temple Israel House, an education building was erected next door at 5011 Washington Avenue. The building, no longer a synagogue, is located in what is now called Holy Corners Historic District, added to the added to the National Register of Historic Places in 1975.

In 1957, membership had grown to 1,358, and a larger facility was needed to accommodate. The cornerstone of a new Temple Israel building was laid on June 18, 1960, though only after a legal battle with the city when the congregation chose its new home. The synagogue was involved in litigation against the City of Creve Coeur when the City changed its zoning rules to prohibit any churches, including the synagogue, just after the synagogue purchased land for a new building. The Supreme Court of Missouri ruled that state law did not authorize municipalities to regulate the location of churches.

The Creve Coeur synagogue was completed in 1962 and is located on a 24-acre (9.7 ha) site in suburban greater St. Louis. Designed in the Modernist style by Gyo Obata of Hellmuth, Obata, and Kassabaum with a floor plan in a dual hexagon pattern, the building has capacity for 2,200 worshippers for peak High Holiday services. The synagogue contains notable artworks by Rodney Winfield and Robert Cronbach.

The congregation has attracted a number of notable speakers to address the congregation including Dr. Martin Luther King, Jr., Abba Eben, Henry Kissinger, and Simon Wiesenthal.

The synagogue conducted its first wedding for an LGBT couple in 2008. In 2010, Temple Israel made history by promoting assistant rabbi, Amy Feder, 31, to senior rabbi, making her the youngest female senior rabbi to lead a large Reform congregation in North America. In 2018, the Temple had approximately 900 member households.

== Rabbis ==
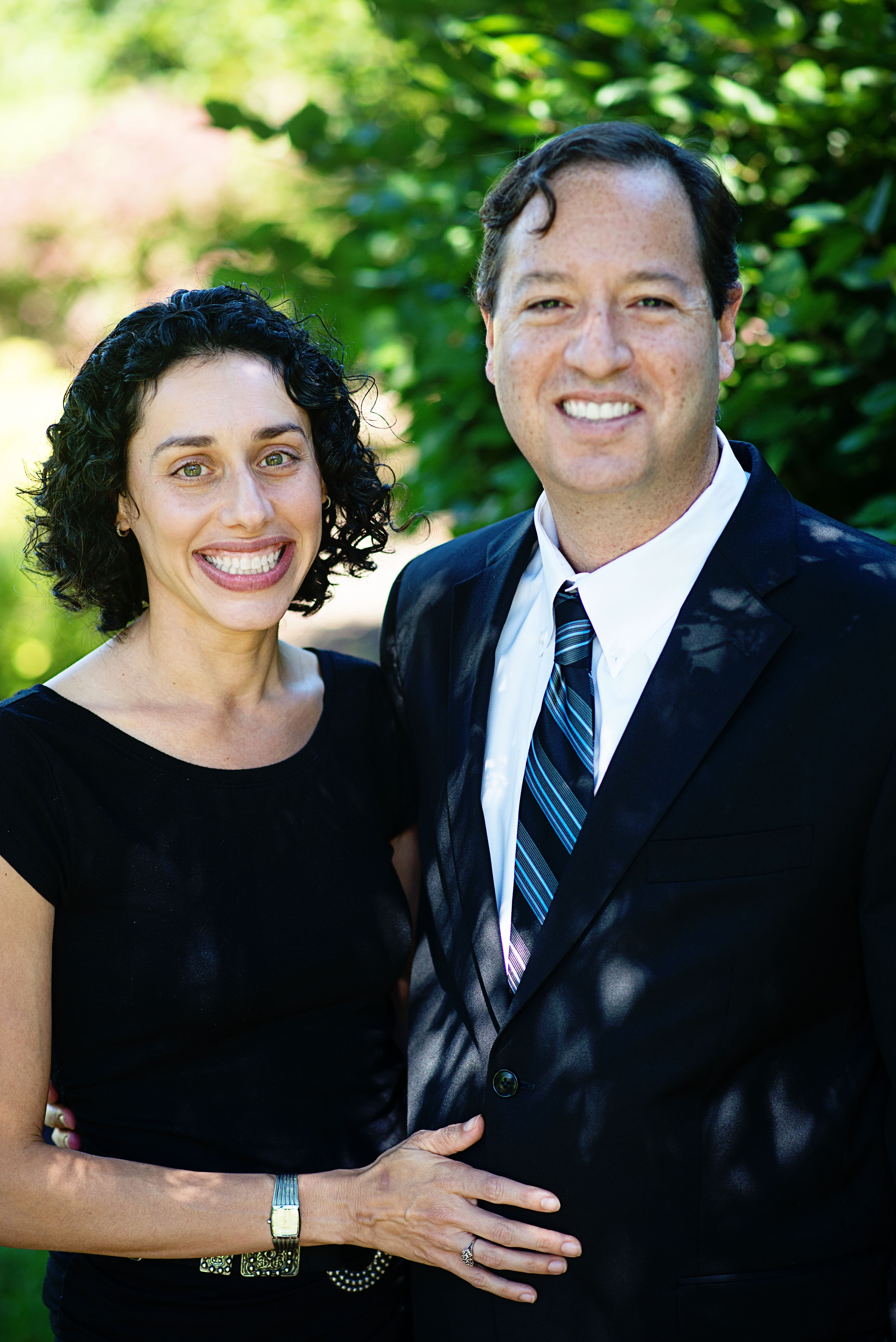
Amy Feder and Michael Alper, Senior Rabbis

The following individuals have served as rabbi of the congregation:

- Solomon H. Sonneschein, 1886–1890
- Leon Harrison, 1891–1928
- Ferdinand M. Isserman, 1929–1963
- Martin E. Katzenstein, 1963–1967
- Alvan D. Rubin, 1967–1987
- Mark L. Shook, 1987–2010
- Amy Feder, 2010–present
- Michael Alper, 2023–present

== Notable members ==
- Benjamin Altheimer
- Kurt Deutsch
- Sam Fox
- Tom Gallop
