= Eye of Fashion =

Sculpture in Manhattan, New York, U.S.

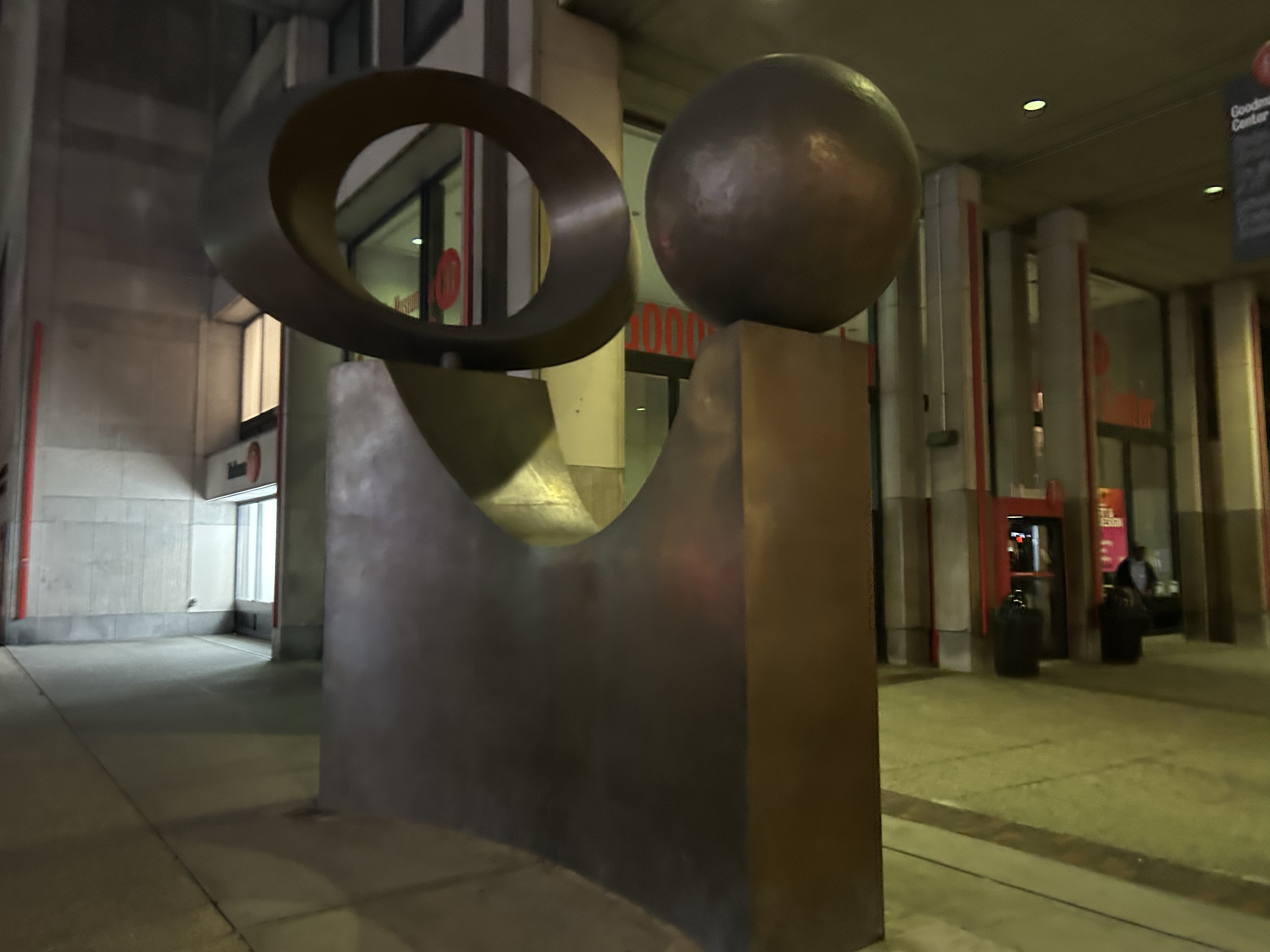
- The sculpture in May 2023
- Artist: Robert Cronbach
- Year: 1976
- Medium: Bronze sculpture
- Location: New York City, New York, U.S.
- 40°44′47.8″N 73°59′38.7″W

Eye of Fashion is an 18 x 10 foot bronze sculpture by Robert Cronbach in 1978, installed outside the Fashion Institute of Technology's Goodman Center, in Manhattan, New York City.

== About Robert Cronbach ==
An artist and political activist, Robert Cronbach, was hired by the Works Progress Administration to create public art. His style of art dealt with the working class, social statements, and the relationship between art and landscape. He was known for his art at the Social Security Building in Washington, D.C., and the University of Minnesota Frederick R. Weisman Art Museum. Cronbach was also commissioned to create sculptures for the Smithsonian American Art Museum in Washington and the U.N. General Assembly Meditation Room in New York.

== Restoration ==
In 2017, the beloved sculpture spent approximately a year and a half at a Bronx-based art restoration facility to fix damages. The steel armature had rusted and the gold finish was showing major signs of deterioration. Cronbach had originally intended for the sculpture to oxidize over time but environmental effects had rapidly aged the FIT monument.

The restoration was performed by Wilson Conservation, LLC, a conservation firm owned by FIT alumna, Jackie Wilson. She has overseen many outdoor sculpture restorations in places such as at Herald Square, Madison Square Park, Princeton University, and the New York Public Library on Fifth Avenue. The restoration process included restoring the armature, cleaning of the exterior, and finishing the sculpture with a protective patina.

== Eye of Fashion Returns ==
On September 22, 2018, the Eye of Fashion was returned to its home outside the Goodman Center, on the southwest corner of 27th Street and Seventh Avenue.

== See also ==
- 1976 in art
