= William Clutz =

American artist (1933–2021)

- Born: William Hartman Clutz; March 19, 1933; Gettysburg, Pennsylvania, US
- Died: July 26, 2021 (aged 88); Rhinebeck, New York, US
- Education: Mercersburg Academy, University of Iowa, Art Students League

William Clutz (March 19, 1933 – July 26, 2021) was an American artist known for urban paintings, pastels, and charcoal drawings of pedestrian scenes transformed by light. (Note: Gerrit Henry, Review, Art in America, Feb 1998. "… Clutz is nothing short of brilliant in the way he manages with exactness to capture New York light …". Bloomfield, Arthur, Review, San Francisco Sun, 1967. "[Clutz] draws with a free but meaningful hand, catching the Manhattan winter scene in an effortlessly vivid manner.") He was associated with a revival in figurative representation in American art during the 1950s and 1960s. (Note: "The "Return of the Figure" means many things. Back it comes in William Clutz' strangely moving paintings at the David Herbert Gallery ... " This revival is characterized by three major exhibitions: "The Emerging Figure", Contemporary Arts Museum Houston, Texas, 1961; "Recent Painting USA: The Figure", Museum of Modern Art, NY, 1962; and "The Figure in Contemporary American Painting", American Federation of Arts (travelling), 1960-61,"The Figure-International", American Federation of Arts (travelling),1965-66 which all include works by Clutz.)

Clutz was born in Gettysburg, Pennsylvania, and he grew up in Mercersburg, Pennsylvania. He attended Mercersburg Academy and University of Iowa. He moved to New York City in 1955 to begin his career as a professional artist, and lived there until 1996 when he moved to Rhinebeck, New York.

== Early life ==
In 1933, Dr. and Mrs. Paul A. Clutz, moved from their parents' homes in Gettysburg, PA to Mercersburg, PA, only a few months after the birth of their second son, William. Dr. Clutz was a recent graduate of the University of Pennsylvania Medical School. He enlisted in the navy in 1941, returning from the Pacific Theater in 1946. Mrs. Clutz received a B.A. in Art History from Barnard College, and was aware of the contemporary art world of the time.

William Clutz indicated an early interest in the arts as a child. At age 11, it was suggested that he study art with a recent Mercersburg resident, Thomas Danaher. (Note: "He was most fortunate; Tom Danaher, a former student of Hans Hoffmann, lived and taught art in the same small village at that time and it was Tom Danaher who trained the young artist and introduced him to the New York Art World", Helen Thomas.) Danaher (1908–1975) and his wife, Ellen, had moved to Mercersburg in 1944, soon after Thomas had finished his tour of duty in the Navy. He was a New York City native, and had studied art at the Cooper Union and at the Art Students League. He had studied under Hans Hoffman and Rockwell Kent. Clutz continued to study with Danaher when the latter began teaching at the nearby Washington County Museum of Fine Arts. (Note: "Under the direction of Tom Danaher, Service Division, the school is now in its fifth year. [Thomas] Danaher, well qualified in his field, looks back on studies with Adolph Dehn, Rockwell Kent and Hans Hoffman". Danaher was an illustrator for Fairchild Aircraft, Hagerstown, MD.) Clutz attended Mercersburg Academy from 1947 to 1951 and continued his studies with Danaher, as the academy offered no art courses at that time.

Clutz attended the University of Iowa from 1951 to 1955. During this time, he began exhibiting his own paintings in local shows, winning 1st prize at the annual Washington County Museum Regional Cumberland Valley Artists Exhibition in 1952, 1953, 1957 and an honorable mention at the 1954 Iowa Annual in Des Moines, Iowa.

== Career ==
In 1955, Clutz moved to New York City, and began his career as a professional artist. Situated in an area of other struggling artists, he lived on East 9th St. between Avenues B and C near Tompkins Square Park, the subject of several of his early works. (Note: His participation in this local artistic community was displayed by his inclusion of "Tompkins Square" (ca. 1956) in "The Gathering of the Avant-Garde: The Lower East Side 1950-1970", at the Kenkeleba House, 1984. For images of Tompkins Square, see his paintings in the Hirshhorn Museum, such as "Figures 1960" or "Figures in Street 1961".) He supported his painting career by working a number of part-time jobs. In 1957, he briefly took classes at the Art Students League in Manhattan. (Note: Clutz studied under Robert Brackmann, who offered classes on "Long Figure Poses" and "Color Composition")

In New York, abstract expressionism was the orthodox approach to art at the time. However, Clutz was committed to his personal style that focused on abstracted human figures within urban tableaux. Working in a context of artists who challenged abstract expressionism's popularity in New York, Clutz established himself as a significant proponent of abstract figuration. (Note: Alfred H. Barr Jr. writes: "It is therefore not surprising to discover young painters concerned once more with "the figure" as an organizing principle. The sudden prominence, in the work of the children of the de Kooning generation, of the First Idea will inevitably be applauded as a sign that the revolutionary impulse of contemporary American painting has run its course." See also: The Emerging Figure: Contemporary Arts Museum, May–June, 1961. Houston, Texas: The Museum, 1961.) His paintings focus on human figures within the urban environment, often exposing the transfiguration of his subjects as they travel through the complex light of city streets or summer parks, as shown in two of his early works, "Figures, 1960" and "Summer Park, 1960".

"Big Street City Light", 1991–1992. Held in private collection.

Clutz's interest in working from direct observation of urban life was influenced by a long-standing interest in German Expressionism, as well as artists like Henri Matisse, Arshile Gorky, and Nicholas De Stael, and also Albert Ryder's series of reductive seascapes.

If there ever was an Impressionist of the contemporary metropolis, it is surely Clutz, an artist who has rejected the niceties of representation in favor of the quintessences.

— Gerrit Henry, Art News, December 1979

At points in his career, interest in Clutz's charcoal drawings or his pastels competed with interest in his paintings. In 1961, he began producing a series of large charcoal drawings at the request of his dealer, David Herbert. In 1962, Clutz joined the Bertha Schaefer Gallery on 57th Street, where his drawings continued to be in demand throughout the 1960s. (Note: See: Clutz, Four People in a Doorway ca. 1962, in the Lois Orswell Coll. at the Fogg Museum, Harvard University; Clutz, Drawing, 1964 Coll. at the Guggenheim Museum; Clutz, Drawing, Coll. at the Museum of Modern Art; Clutz, Light on a Dark Street, Francis Lehman Loeb Museum, Vassar College; and others. See Arthur Bloomfield's review, "Somber Artist Gets on Whimsy Wagon", San Francisco Sun, 1967, and also Thomas Albright's review, "Recent Openings: William Clutz", S.F. Chronicle, Apr. 13, 1967, he writes: "Charcoal drawings of exceptional accomplishment and force, Triangle Gallery, 576 Sutter Street".)

In 1971, Brooke Alexander, a young contemporary print publisher and dealer, asked Clutz to create a colored print. After Clutz produced a series of large pastels, Alexander agreed to show them in his gallery. . (Note: As demonstrated by Clutz's 1973 show, "William Clutz Pastels," Brooke Alexander Gallery, New York, NY.) He continued to sell Clutz's pastels throughout the 1970s. Clutz produced some hand colored prints for Brooke Alexander during this period; some of these were exhibited by Alexander in "Hand-colored Prints", 1973. (Note: "Untitled (Summer Street)", 1973, at the Worcester Art Museum, was included in this show.)

In the 1970s, Clutz continued to sell many pastels and paintings through the Alonzo Gallery on 57th Street. (Note: See catalogue accompanying "American Pastels In The Metropolitan Museum Of Art 1989", Doreen Bolger et al., with two illustrations by Clutz, p. 157-8.) Many of these pastels were shown in his exhibition in the Walther-Rathenau-Saal, Berlin 1978.

The Alonzo Gallery closed in 1980, and in 1981 Clutz became represented by the nearby 57th St. Tatistcheff Gallery. He exhibited pastels often there in group and solo shows. Clutz left the gallery because he was more interested in showing paintings rather than pastels. After leaving Tatistcheff, Clutz continued to show pastels in Los Angeles at Terrence Rogers Fine Art.

In 1997 Clutz exhibited paintings at the Nicholas Davies Gallery in Manhattan's Greenwich Village, NY. . (Note: William Clutz, NY Retrospect 1955-1975.) He also exhibited new paintings at Carrie Haddad Gallery, Hudson, NY. After seeing these exhibitions, Katharina Rich Perlow invited Clutz to join her gallery, which happened to be located in same 57th St. building as Clutz's 1960s dealer, Bertha Schaefer. Clutz continued to show often and successfully at this gallery until it closed in 2009.

The artist was elected to the National Academy of Design in 2005.

In a review of Clutz's retrospective exhibition in 2002, "William Clutz: Five Decades of New York Streets", Ken Johnson writes:

Since the late 1950s, Mr. Clutz has been painting the street life of New York, simplifying its complexity to the brink of abstraction. The canvasses in this five-decade survey call to mind Edward Hopper's romantic nostalgia and Alex Katz's suave modernity.

— Ken Johnson, The New York Times, Nov. 29 2002

Clutz taught painting and drawing at Parsons The New School for Design from 1970 to 1994. Before that, he taught at the University of Minnesota, Duluth, from 1967 to 1968. He also participated in a teaching exchange at the Gerrit Rietveld Academie, Amsterdam, and the Royal Academy, The Hague, in 1984. He received the Distinguished Teaching Award at Parsons The New School for Design in 1989.

In 1996, Clutz moved from Manhattan to Rhinebeck, NY, where he resided. He retired in 2008. Clutz died on July 26, 2021.

John F. Sheehy, Clutz's partner for 30 years, an antiques dealer and Ireland native, died in 2007.

== Selected important works in major collections ==
Significant works by Clutz are included in the collections of Hirshhorn Museum and Sculpture Garden, DC; Washington County Museum of Fine Arts, MD; The Metropolitan Museum of Art, NY; National Academy Museum, NY; Dayton Art Institute, OH; Museum of Modern Art, NY; Newark Museum, NJ; Museum of the City of New York, NY; Tweed Museum of Art, MN; Hudson River Museum, NY; Mercersburg Academy, PA; Telfair Museum of Art, Savannah, GA; Corcoran Gallery of Art, DC; The Brooklyn Museum, NY; Huntsville Museum of Art, LA; and others.

His works are also included in many corporate collections, including Chase Bank, NY; Third National Bank and Trust, Dayton, OH; Bradley Family Foundation (Lynden Sculpture Garden), Milwaukee, WI; First Bank Minneapolis, MN; Minnesota Mutual, St. Paul, MN; Mobil Corp. Fairfax, VA; McKinsey and Co., NY, and others.

His career materials are deposited in the Archives of American Art, Smithsonian Institution, Washington, DC. Fifteen of his major works and associated documentation comprise his legacy collection at the Washington County Museum of Fine Arts.

== Selected exhibition chronology ==
- 1956 "Recent Drawings USA," Museum of Modern Art, New York, NY
- 1959 "William Clutz," Condon Riley Gallery, New York, NY
- 1961 "The Emerging Figure," Contemporary Arts Museum Houston, TX
- 1961 "The Figure in Contemporary American Painting," American Federation of Artists, (travelling)
- 1962 "Recent Painting USA: The Figure," Museum of Modern Art, New York, NY
- 1962 "William Clutz," David Herbert Gallery, New York, NY
- 1963 "William Clutz: New Paintings," Bertha Schaefer Gallery, New York, NY
- 1964 "Annual," Pennsylvania Academy of the Fine Arts, Philadelphia, PA
- 1964 "William Clutz: New Paintings," Bertha Schaefer Gallery, New York, NY
- 1965 "Annual", Sheldon Memorial Art Gallery, University of Nebraska, Lincoln, NE
- 1966 "Annual", Norfolk Museum of Arts and Science, Norfolk, VA
- 1966 "Annual", Pennsylvania Academy of the Fine Arts, Philadelphia, PA
- 1966 "William Clutz", Bertha Schaefer Gallery, New York, NY
- 1967 "William Clutz: Charcoal Drawings," Triangle Gallery, San Francisco, CA
- 1968 "William Clutz: Paintings," Tweed Gallery, University of Minnesota, Duluth, MN
- 1969 "William Clutz: Gardens," Bertha Schaefer Gallery, New York, NY
- 1972 "William Clutz," Graham Gallery, New York, NY
- 1973 "William Clutz Pastels" Brooke Alexander Gallery, New York, NY
- 1973 "Hand Colored Prints," Brooke Alexander Gallery, New York, NY
- 1977 "American Drawings," Smithsonian Institution, Washington, DC
- 1977 "William Clutz" Alonzo Gallery, New York, NY
- 1978 "Bill Clutz New York", Hans Goetsch Berlin, Walther-Rathenau-Saal, Rathaus Wedding, Berlin, Germany
- 1978 "William Clutz," Alonzo Gallery, New York, NY
- 1979 "William Clutz," Alonzo Gallery, New York, NY
- 1980 "William Clutz: Paintings," John C. Stoller Gallery, Minneapolis, MN
- 1981 "Of Time and Place, American Figurative Art from the Corcoran Gallery," Washington, DC (travelling)
- 1981 "William Clutz," Tatistcheff Gallery, New York, NY
- 1982 "William Clutz: New Pastels," Tatistcheff Gallery, New York, NY
- 1983 "William Clutz: Paintings," John C. Stoller Gallery, Minneapolis, MN
- 1984 "William Clultz: New Pastels, Chicago & Los Angeles," Tatistcheff & Co., New York, NY
- 1984 "William Clutz: Pastels," P.B. van Voorst van Beest Gallery, The Hague, Netherlands
- 1985 "American Realism; Twentieth Century Watercolors and Drawings," San Francisco Museum of Modern Art, San Francisco, CA
- 1986 "William Clutz: New Pastels," Duluth and Minneapolis, Tweed Museum of Art, University of Minnesota, Duluth, MN
- 1987 "William Clutz: New LA Pastels," Tatistcheff Gallery, Los Angeles, CA
- 1988 "William Clutz," John C. Stoller Gallery, Minneapolis, MN
- 1988 "New American Pastels," Christian A. Johnson Memorial Art Gallery, Middlebury, VT
- 1990 "Revivals and Revitalization: American Pastels in the Metropolitan," Metropolitan Museum of Art, New York, NY
- 1991 "Retrospective: William Clutz," Washington County Museum of Fine Arts, Hagerstown, MD
- 1992 "William Clutz: New LA Pastels," Tatistcheff Gallery, Los Angeles, CA
- 1997 "William Clutz: Retrospective 1955-1975," Nicholas Davies Gallery, New York, NY
- 1999 "William Clutz: Paintings," Katherina Rich Perlow Gallery, New York, NY
- 2000 "William Clutz: New Paintings," Katherina Rich Perlow Gallery, New York, NY
- 2001 William Clutz: New Paintings," Katherina Rich Perlow Gallery, New York, NY
- 2002 "William Clutz: Five Decades of New York Streets," Katharina Rich Perlow Gallery, New York, NY
- 2005 "William Clutz: New Paintings," Katharina Rich Perlow Gallery, New York, NY
- 2009 "William Clutz: 60s and 70s Paintings," Katharina Rich Perlow Gallery, New York, NY
- 2013 "William Clutz: New York Streets," Carrie Haddad Gallery, Hudson, NY

== Sources ==
- O'Doherty, Brian, Review, "Tumult of Streets: Openings by Clutz and others", The New York Times, November 6, 1963
- New York Herald Tribune, Review, November 9, 1963
- ARTnews, Review, November 1963; Arts Magazine, Review, January, 1964;
- Time Magazine Review, June 17, 1966
- Albright, Thomas, Review, San Francisco Chronicle, April 13, 1967; Cotter, Holland, review, New York Arts Journal, 1977
- Gerrit Henry, Review, Art in America, Feb 1998, Kuntz Melissa, Review, Art in America, April 2003
- Martin, Alvin, American Realism: Twentieth Century Drawings and Watercolors, Abrams, NY 1986
- Norelli, Martina Roudabush, "William Clutz", Allgemeines Kunstlerexikon, Munich, K.G. Saur Verlage, Munich, Leipsig, April 1995
- Johnson, Ken, Review, The New York Times, Nov. 29 2002
- Woods, Jean, William Clutz Retrospective, Washington County Museum of Fine Arts
- Of Time and Place: American figurative Art from the Corcoran Gallery, Smithsonian Institution, 1981, "Bill Clutz", exhibition catalogue, Walter-Rathenau-Saal, Berlin, Germany, 1978
- Mangan, Doreen, "William Clutz Captures The Soul Of a City," American Artist, February 1978.
