= First Church of Christ, Scientist (St. Louis, Missouri) =

- U.S. Historic district – Contributing property
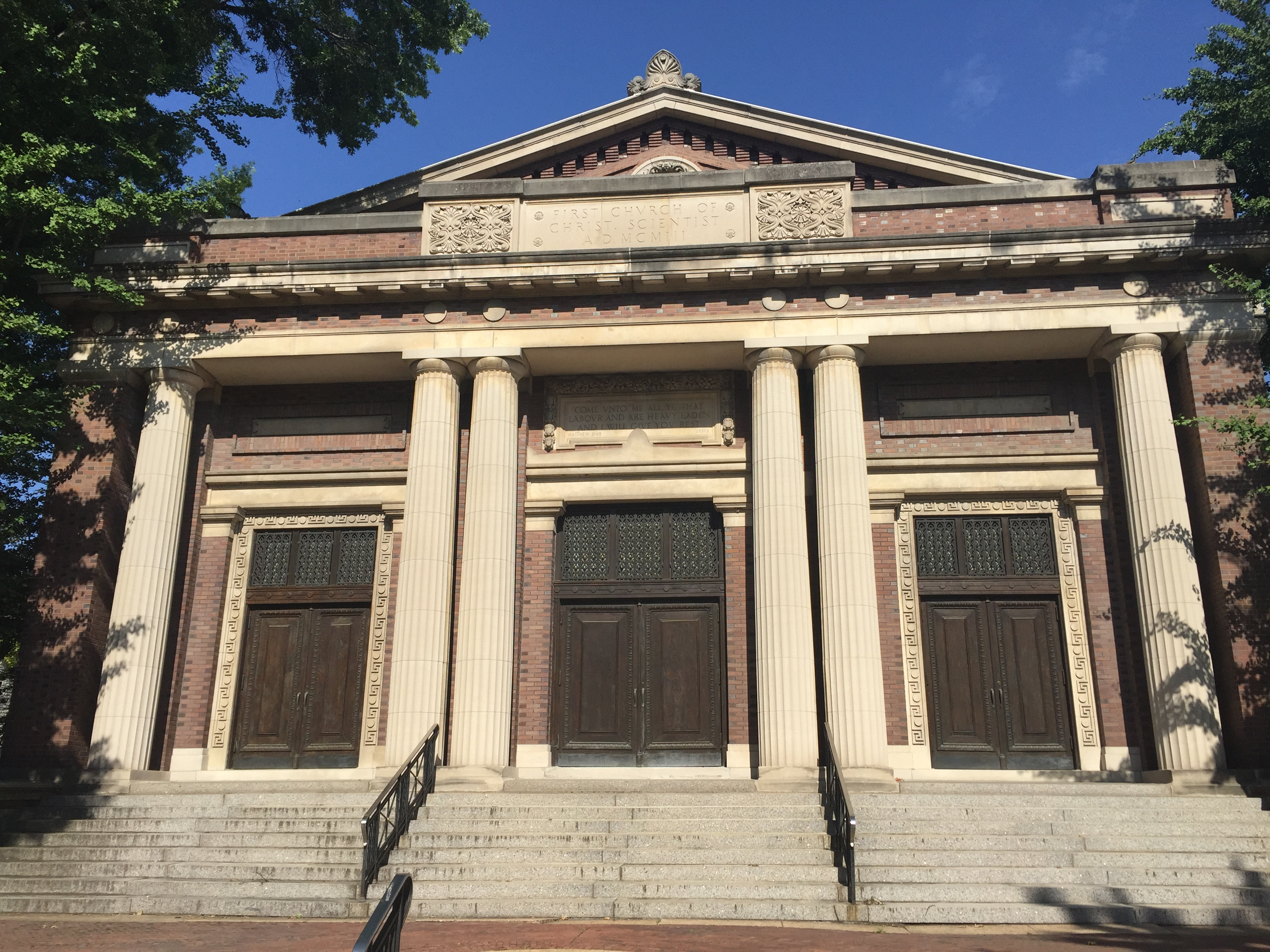

- Location within St. Louis Location within Missouri Location within the United States
- Location: 475 North Kingshighway Boulevard, corner of Westminster Place, St. Louis, Missouri
- Coordinates: 38.649077°N 90.264516°W
- Built: 1903-1904
- Architect: Mauran, Russell & Garden
- Architectural style: Classical Revival
- Part of: Holy Corners Historic District (ID75002138)
- Added to NRHP: December 29, 1975

First Church of Christ, Scientist, is an historic Christian Science church edifice located at 475 North Kingshighway Boulevard, corner of Westminster Place, in St. Louis, Missouri. Built in 1903–1904, it was designed as a stone building in the Classical Revival style of architecture by Edward Gordon Garden of Mauran, Russell & Garden and was the first institutional commission of that fledgling firm. Cost concerns, though, resulted in it being built of brick. It is a contributing property in the Holy Corners Historic District which was added to the National Register of Historic Places on December 29, 1975.

First Church of Christ, Scientist, which had been founded in 1894, still holds services in this historic building.
