= Holy Corners Historic District =

Historic district in Missouri, United States

- U.S. National Register of Historic Places
- U.S. Historic district
- St. Louis Landmark
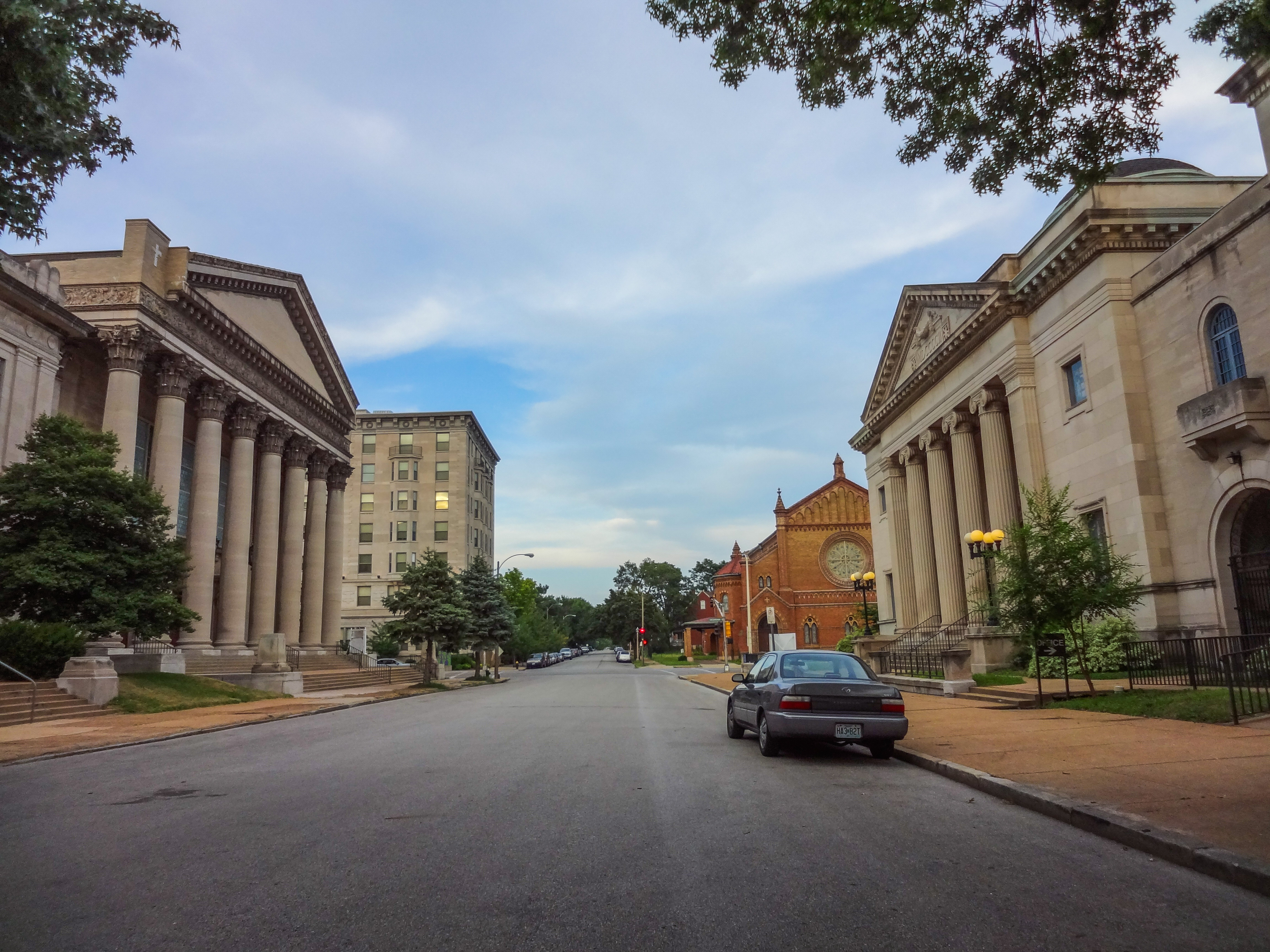
- Holy Corners Historic District as seen from Washington Avenue, July 2011

- Location within St. Louis Location within Missouri Location within the United States
- Location: Both sides of Kingshighway Boulevard between and including Westminster Place and Washington Avenue, St. Louis, Missouri
- Coordinates: 38°38′59″N 90°15′49″W
- Area: 9.8 acres (4.0 ha)
- Built: 1902
- Architect: Multiple
- Architectural style: Greek Revival, Renaissance
- NRHP reference No.: 75002138
- Added to NRHP: December 29, 1975

Holy Corners Historic District, so named because of its concentration of early 20th-century churches, temples and other large buildings of public assembly, is located on both sides of North Kingshighway Boulevard between and including Westminster Place and Washington Avenue in St. Louis, Missouri. On December 29, 1975, the district was added to the National Register of Historic Places.

== Contributing properties ==
Contributing properties in the district include:

- St. John's Methodist Church, 5000 Washington Boulevard (1902)
- First Church of Christ, Scientist, 475 North Kingshighway Boulevard (1904)
- Racquet Club, 476 North Kingshighway Boulevard (1906)
- Second Baptist Church, 520 North Kingshighway Boulevard (1907)
- Temple Israel, 5001 Washington Boulevard (1908)
- Tuscan Masonic Temple, 5015 Westminster Place (1908)
- First Unitarian Church, 5007 Waterman Blvd.
