= Albert Stern (rabbi) =

Hungarian rabbi (1826–1888)

Personal life
- Born: Áron Stern; 1826 Nagykanizsa, Kingdom of Hungary
- Died: June 16, 1888 (aged 61–62) Ofen, Austria-Hungary
- Spouse: Julia Fassel
- Children: József Szterényi; Hugó Szterényi

Religious life
- Religion: Judaism

Albert Áron Stern (Hebrew: אהרן שטרן; 1826 – June 16, 1888), later Szterényi, was a Hungarian rabbi.

== Biography ==
Albert Stern was born into a rabbinical family in Nagykanizsa, Hungary. His father, Jákob Léb Stern, was dayyan of Nagykanizsa and later of Sárvár, and his father-in-law Hirsch Bär Fassel was chief rabbi of Nagykanizsa. He was educated at the Pressburg and Óbuda Yeshivas. At the former, he studied under the Ktav Sofer, with whom later maintained a correspondence.

Stern served as the rabbi of Lengyeltóti from 1851 until 1867, when he was appointed to the rabbinate of Újpest. However, his tenure there ended in 1884 due to controversies surrounding his demands for extreme religious reform. In December 1885, now living in Budapest, Stern sought official permission to found the "Israelite Reformed Church". This request was rejected by Ágoston Trefort, Minister of Religion and Public Education.

In his desire for assimilation, Stern adopted the Hungarianized surname Szterényi in 1881. All five of his children converted to Christianity. One of his sons, József Szterényi, was a prominent politician; another, Hugó Szterényi, was a noted mineralogist.

Stern died on June 16, 1888, at the insane asylum in Ofen.

== Writing ==
As a scholar, Stern wrote on a range of topics. He founded the German-language Jewish periodical Hamechaker: Zeitschrift für jüdische Theologie und Geschichte in populär-wissenschaftlicher Form (later Die Zeit), which ran for three volumes between 1877 and 1879. In the journal, he published studies on topics such as the laws governing proselytes, the history of rabbinical seminaries, exhumation practices, ritual divorce, the life of the medieval scholar Alfasi, and the principle of dina d'malkhuta dina. Stern also wrote on the topic of Jewish names (Nagykanizsa, 1864) and a study on the law and history of burial practices (Pest, 1874).

=== Selected publications ===
- Jesaeas aller Zeiten Volkslehrer Antrittsrede ... gehalten am 8. December 1851 (in German). Groß-Kanischa: Markbreiter u. Ollop.
- Der methodische Rechner für Lehrer und Schüler zum Schul-, Privat- und Selbstunterrichte (in German). Groß-Kanischa: Markbreiter u. Ollop. 1852.
- Der methodische mosaische Religionslehrer für Knaben- und Töchterschulen (in German). Groß-Kanischa: J. Markbreiter. 1853.
- A frigy kötelmei: halachai értekezet (in Hungarian). Nagykanizsa: J. Markbreiter. 1863.
- A népünnep, vagyis Ferencz József születésnapja. Ünnepi beszéd (in Hungarian). Pest. 1867.
- Das Loesegeld fuer Judenthum und Vaterland (in German). Groß-Kanischa: P. Fischel. 1867.
- Sendschreiben an Herrn Dr. A. Stein, Rabbiner und Prediger in Prag (in German). Pest: E. Bartalits. 1870.
- Ueber ehegesetzliche Zeitfragen (in German). Pest: E. Bartalits. 1873.
- Ueber Gesetz und Geschichte der Leichenbestattung und über diesbezügliche Bräuche und Mißbräuche (in German). Budapest: E. Bartalits. 1874.
- A polgári házasság tekintettel a vegyes házasságra a szidó törvény és történelem szempntjából (in Hungarian). Budapest: Révai testvérek bizománya. 1883.
