= Rodney Winfield =

American sculptor

Rodney M Winfield
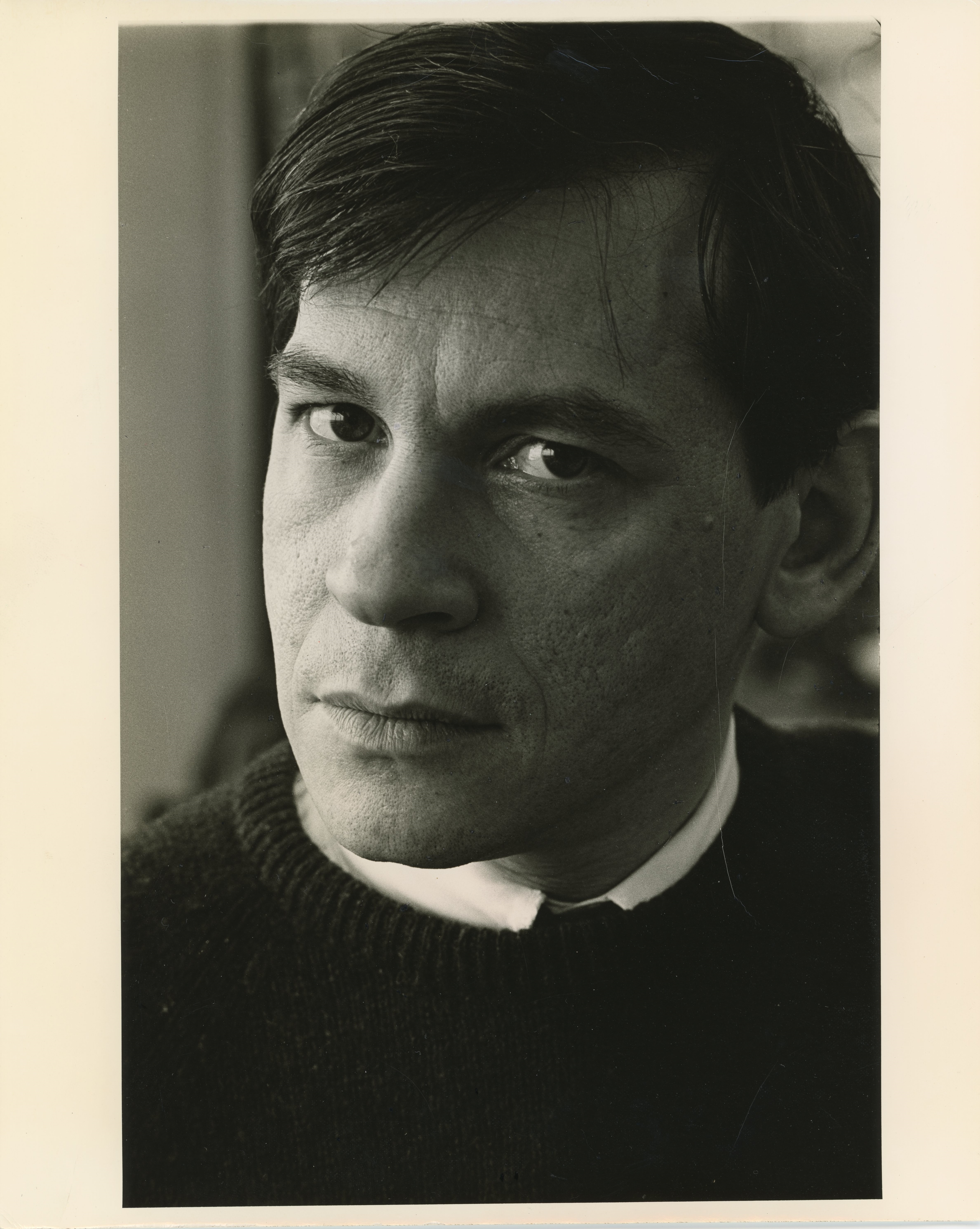
- Born: 6 February 1925; New York City
- Died: December 13, 2017 (aged 92); Monterey, California
- Known for: Sculpture, Design
- Notable work: Space Window (stained glass), National Cathedral; Brotherhood of Man (relief sculpture), Grace Cathedral
- Spouse: Betty Winfield

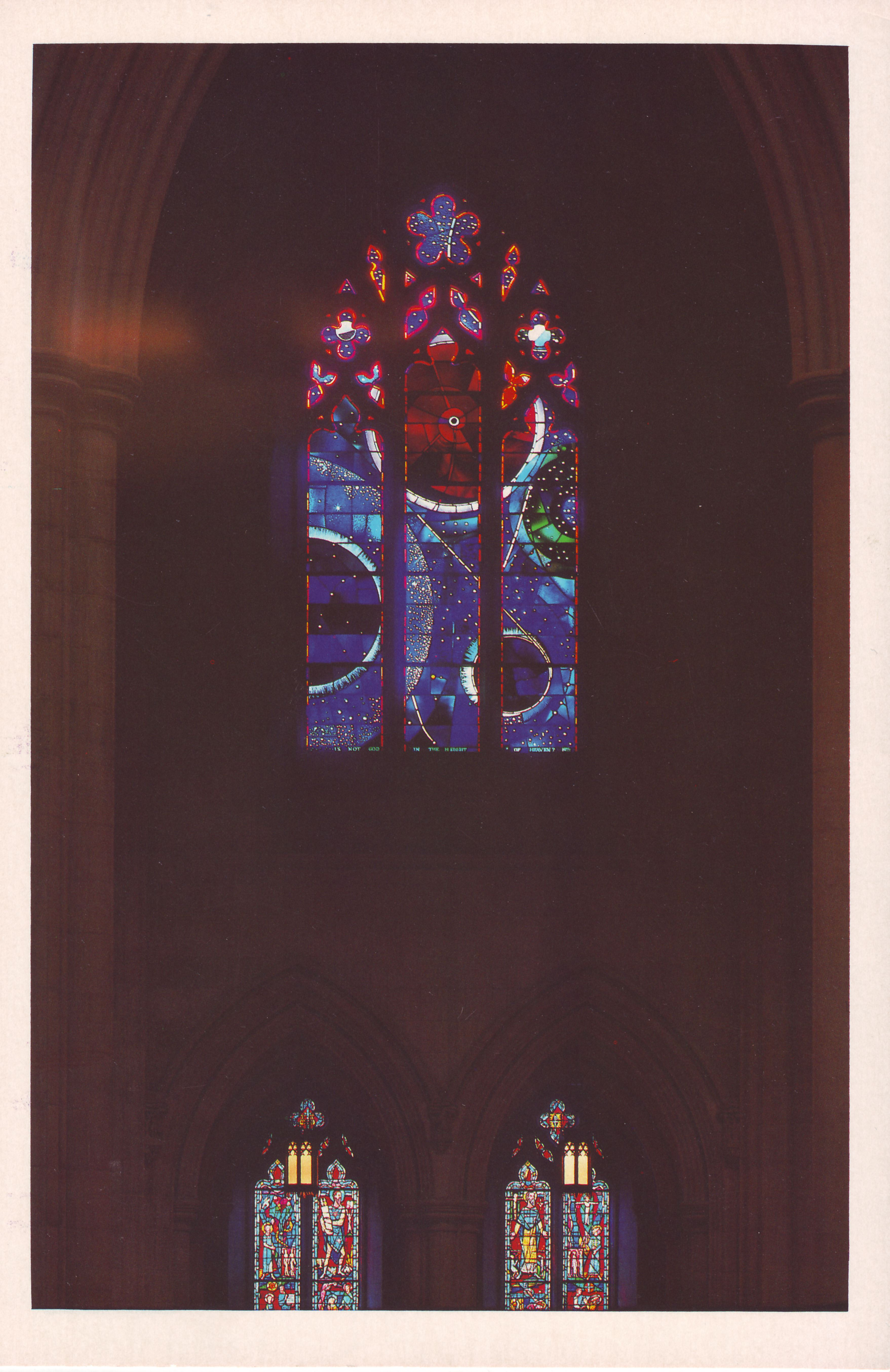
The Space Window at the National Cathedral

Rodney Winfield (1925-2017) was an American designer and artist based in St. Louis. He designed mostly stained glass as well as silver and brass repoussé, and was notably one of the first to use three dimensions in his stained glass design.

== Life and career ==
Rodney Winfield briefly studied under Carl Ruggles to become a classical musician, before attending the Cooper Union School of Art in New York City under Leo Katz and Stanley William Hayter. Winfield took a position at Emil Frei and Associates after moving to St. Louis in 1953, and was a Professor of Art at Maryville University from 1964 to 1990. In 1970, Winfield moved to Carmel, California, and opened his own studio.

While Winfield designed works almost exclusively for religious institutions, he himself was not religious. Winfield married and had four children, three of whom went on to be artists themselves.

== Major works ==
Winfield's more well known work was mostly commissions for churches and synagogues, but he also illustrated, painted, sculpted, drew, and made jewelry.

=== Stained glass ===
- Washington National Cathedral in Washington, D.C.
- Basilica of the National Shrine of the Little Flower in San Antonio, T.X.
- The Sheldon in St. Louis, M.O.
- Shaare Zedeek Synagogue in University City, M.O.
- Desloge Chapel, St. Louis University Hospital in St. Louis, M.O.
- Marquette Gallery, St. Louis University in St. Louis, M.O.

==== The Space Window ====
Officially titled the "Scientists and Technicians Window", the stained glass window at Washington National Cathedral in Washington, D.C. contains a basalt Moon rock, weighing 7.18 grams. The window was dedicated by the crew of Apollo 11, Neil Armstrong, Buzz Aldrin, and Michael Collins. The Space Window contains the only Moon rock given to a non-government agency.

=== Silver and brass repoussé and sculpture ===
- Brotherhood of Man, Grace Cathedral, San Francisco, California
- Rondelle, Christ the King Chapel, Little Rock, Arkansas
- Altarpiece, Temple Israel, St. Louis, Missouri
- Shrine Doors, National Shrine of Our Lady of the Snows, Belleville, Illinois
- Anthropomorpheus Orpheus

==== Shrine of Our Lady of the Snows ====
Winfield designed two sets of bronze double doors for the Shrine's chapel, one to represent the Old Testament of the Bible, and one to represent the New Testament. From the shrine's website:

The doors at the right side of the chapel depict the major Old Testament prophets-Moses, Isaiah Jeremiah, and Ezekiel surrounding the tree of Jesse. The New Testament doors, found on the left side of the chapel, depict the Nativity of the Child Jesus. The four Evangelists surround a palm tree that represents Christ's martyrdom. The center section of the doors illustrates the two great Sacraments of the Church (Baptism and the Eucharist).

Winfield also designed the bronze crucifix and the black marble altar and tabernacle used in outside liturgies there.

=== Illustrations ===
- Short Footsteps on a Long Journey: The Poetry of Chan Sei Ghow (by Chan Sei Ghow, 1967)
- Les Eaux Porteuses: La Decouverte Du Mississippi Par Louis Jolliet et Jacques Marquette (by Anne-Marie de Moret, 1975)
- A Love Without End (by Anne-Marie de Moret, 1976)
