= Robert Cronbach =

American sculptor, teacher (1908–2001)

- Cronbach in the 1930s
- Born: February 10, 1908; St. Louis, Missouri, United States
- Died: December 2001 (aged 93); San Miguel de Allende, Guanajuato, Mexico
- Education: St. Louis School of Fine Arts, Pennsylvania Academy of the Fine Arts
- Occupations: Visual artist, teacher
- Known for: Architectural sculpture, public fountains
- Spouse(s): Maxine Judd Silver (m. 1934–1983; her death), Anne Heathers Cronbach (m. ?–2001; his death)

Robert M. Cronbach (1908 – 2001) was an American sculptor, medalist, and teacher. He is best remembered for his medals, architectural sculpture, public fountains, and other works. He taught for many years at Adelphi University and at the Skowhegan School of Painting and Sculpture.

== Early life, family, and education ==
Robert Cronbach was born on February 10, 1908, in St. Louis, Missouri.

In St. Louis is where he began his art studies at the St. Louis School of Fine Arts. His art studies continued at the Pennsylvania Academy of the Fine Arts where he won two Cresson Traveling Scholarships and travelled to Europe in 1929 and 1930.

In 1934, Cronbach married Maxine Judd Silver; and together they had three children. His first wife died in 1983, after an illness. His second wife was Anne Heathers.

== Career ==
During 1930s, he worked as an assistant to sculptor Paul Manship in his studio in New York City.

In 1938, he was one of the 57 founding members of the Sculptors Guild. He also created sculpture under the auspices of the Works Progress Administration's Federal Art Project.

Cronbach taught sculpture at Adelphi College in Garden City, New York, from 1947 to 1961.

He was one of 250 sculptors who exhibited in the 3rd Sculpture International held at the Philadelphia Museum of Art in the summer of 1949. Cronbach was represented by the Bertha Schaefer Gallery, New York, NY.

Cronbach died in December 2001 in the city of San Miguel de Allende in Guanajuato, Mexico.

== Works ==
- Exploitation, Los Angeles County Museum of Art, Los Angeles, California, 1935
- Sculpture murals for Willert Park Courts, Buffalo, New York, with Harold Ambellan, a WPA project.
- Under the El University of Minnesota, Frederick R. Weisman Art Museum, Minneapolis, Minnesota c. 1939
- Untitled, Springfield Art Museum, Springfield, Missouri, 1959
- Prometheus, Smithsonian American Art Museum, Washington, D.C. 1970
- Eye of Fashion, Fashion Institute of Technology, New York, New York 1976
- Deep Center, Wichita State University, Edwin A. Ulrich Museum of Art, Wichita, Kansas
- Rooftree, Reynolds Aluminum Headquarters, Richmond, Virginia
