= Karin Van Leyden =

German painter (1906–1977)

Karin van Leyden
- Karin van Leyden by Man Ray, Paris, circa 1929
- Born: Elisabeth Frieda Johanna Erna Kluth; July 23, 1906; Berlin, Germany
- Died: 1977 (aged 70–71); Lugano, Switzerland
- Known for: Painting

Karin van Leyden (1906–1977) was a German painter.

Leyden was born on July 23, 1906 in Berlin, Germany. She studied at the Kölner Werkschulen in Cologne. Her teachers included Johan Thorn Prikker and Richard Seewald. She was married to fellow artist Ernst Leyden. The couple traveled through Europe and the Middle East. They moved to the United States in the early 1940s. In California, Leyden transitioned from painting to creating murals and furniture. In 1957 the couple returned to Europe to live. By the 1960s the couple no longer lived together. Leyden settled in Switzerland and created abstract paintings.

Leyden died in 1977 Lugano, Switzerland.

Her work is in the Stedelijk Museum Amsterdam.
