= Solomon H. Sonneschein =

American rabbi (1839–1908)

S. H. Sonneschein, Solomon H. Sonnenschein (June 24, 1839 in Szent Marton, Turocz megye, Hungary – 1908) was a Hungarian rabbi.

He received his education at Boskowitz, Moravia, where he obtained his rabbinical diploma in 1863, and later studied at Hamburg and at the University of Jena (Ph.D. 1864). He was successively as rabbi of congregations at Varaždin, Prague, New York City, and St. Louis (Congregation Temple Israel). From 1905 he officiated at Temple B'nai Yeshurun, Des Moines, Iowa.

In 1864, he married Rosa Sonneschein who would go on to found the magazine American Jewess.

Sonneschein contributed for more than 40 years to numerous German and English periodicals.
