= Rosa Sonneschein =

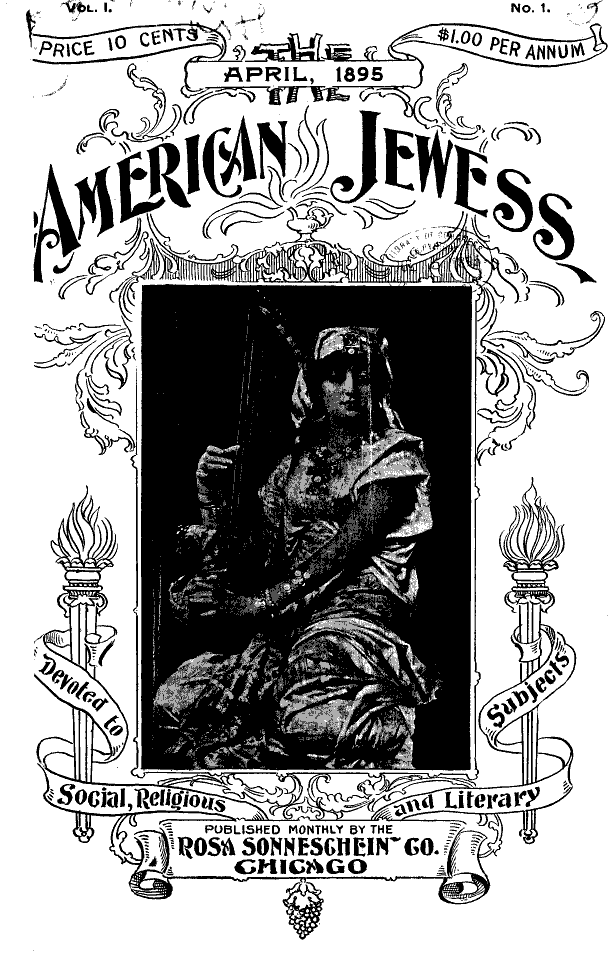
- Born: March 12, 1847; Prostějov, Moravia
- Died: May 12, 1932 (aged 85); St. Louis, Missouri, U.S.
- Occupations: Editor, journalist, activist
- Known for: Founder of American Jewess
- Spouse: Solomon Sonneschein (m. 1864)
- Relatives: Daughter of Hirsch Bär Fassel

Rosa Sonneschein (12 March 1847 – 12 May 1932) was the founder and editor of The American Jewess magazine. It was the first English-language periodical targeted to American Jewish women.

== Personal life ==
Sonneschein was born in Prostějov, Moravia in 1847 to Fannie and Hirsch Bär Fassel. In 1864, she married Rabbi Solomon Sonneschein and moved with his congregational posts to Varaždin, Prague, New York City, and finally to St. Louis, Missouri. They had four children: Ben, Fanny, Leontine, and Monroe, who would later in his life contribute to the magazine. Sonneschein was an active rebbetzin in St. Louis and helped lead ladies' meetings, choral societies, and later founded the Pioneers, a Jewish women's literary society. Rosa and Solomon divorced in 1893. Their prominence in the community and the rarity of divorce at the time caused a sensation reported on in the New York Times. The divorce was granted to Rabbi Sonneschein on the grounds of desertion and thus she was left without alimony, leading her to enterprise on her journalistic skills to support herself. She died on March 5, 1932, in St. Louis.

== Career ==
Sonneschein was a moderate liberal who was sympathetic to Zionism and believed in synagogal rights for women. In 1880, she wrote an essay "The Pioneers" which described her society by the same name. In May 1893, she participated on Press Congress panel at the World's Colombian Exposition in Chicago, where she spoke on "Newspaperwomen in Austria"." Here she described the need for a magazine specifically for American Jewish women. Later in the year, she attended the Jewish Women’s Congress at the same Exposition, and won support from prominent middle-class Jewish women interested in literary, philanthropic, and religious questions. This same congress formed the National Council of Jewish Women (NCJW), to which Sonneschein lent her support. In April 1895, she founded and edited a new magazine called The American Jewess.

From her Editor's Desk column, Sonneschein used the magazine as a platform to advocate for her political and religious views. She urged NCJW members to fight for religious equality within their synagogues, criticized the New Woman ideal, and was one of the first journalists to champion a Jewish homeland in the British Mandate of Palestine.

She was a great admirer of Theodor Herzl and he first wrote for an American audience in her magazine. She was sent as a delegate to the First Zionist Conference in Basel in 1897.

In 1898, she sold the magazine, but stayed on as editor. Over time, she grew increasingly frustrated and publicly critical of NCJW, because the organization did not take up her passion for Zionism or her religious goals. The American Jewess continued to struggle financially and its last issue was published in August 1899. Sonneschein continued to write, but she did not stay involved in the Zionist movement or Jewish women's activism.

== Selected works ==
- "The American Jewess." American Jewess (February 1898)
- "The National Council of Jewish Women and Our Dream of Nationality". American Jewess (October 1896)
- The Pioneers: An Historical Essay (May 1880)
- "Plucked from the Grave" Jewish Messenger (Marcy 1885)
- "Something About the Women's Congress in Brussles". American Jewess (October 1897)
- "Three Kisses" Translated from German by Julius Wise. American Jews' Annual (1884–85)
- "The Zionist Congress". American Jewess (October 1897)
