= The American Jewess =

American Jewish magazine

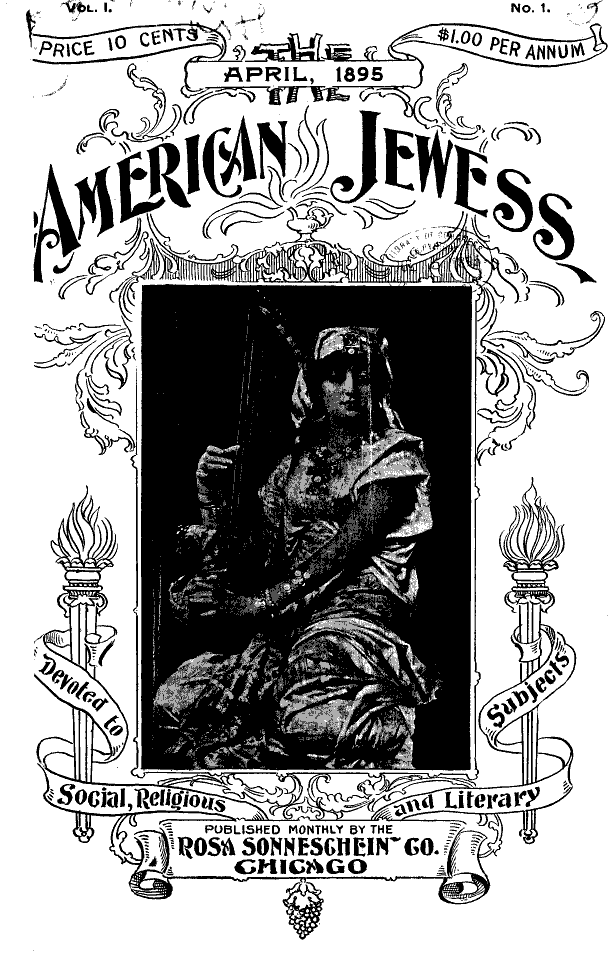
- Cover of the first issue of The American Jewess (April 1895)
- Editor: Rosa Sonneschein
- Categories: Women's magazine
- Circulation: 29,000
- Founder: Rosa Sonneschein
- First issue: April 1895
- Final issue: August 1899
- Country: United States
- Based in: Chicago
- OCLC: 5782568

The American Jewess (1895–1899) described itself as "the only magazine in the world devoted to the interests of Jewish women." It was the first English-language periodical targeted to American Jewish women, covering an evocative range of topics that ranged from women's place in the synagogue to whether women should ride bicycles. The magazine also served as the publicity arm for the newly founded National Council of Jewish Women. The American Jewess was a periodical “published in Chicago and New York between 1895 and 1899” and represented the ideas found among liberal American Jews at the time. It “was the first Jewish women's journal edited by women that were independent of any organizational or religious ties,” along with the “first English-language journal independently edited by women.” The magazine printed stories about politics, famous individuals, aesthetics, and new books. There was also a section for children. The magazine engrained its contents with Zionist views and feminist politics. There were 46 issues published throughout four and a half years, with a circulation totaling approximately 31,000.

== History ==
During 1890 to 1920 “thousands of Jewish immigrants” came to the United States, seeking “respite from persecution, a place safe from repression and pogroms, and an opportunity to make a decent living.” By the end of the nineteenth century, many Jewish Americans “were in a position to live as other bourgeois Americans did” and “emulate the lifestyle of middle-class WASPS." Specifically, “middle-class Jews of both sexes were emulating the folkways of the WASP (White Anglo-Saxon Protestant) community but were not integrated into it. They dressed, entertained and furnished their homes according to the patterns set by the majority but they celebrated different holidays and often found themselves unwelcome in gentile society."

Rosa Sonneschein (1847–1932), an enterprising woman from St. Louis, founded and edited the periodical. The American Jewess offered the first sustained critique, by Jewish women, of gender inequities in Jewish worship and communal life.

Sonneschein gained support for the magazine during the Jewish Women's Congress at the World's Colombian Exposition in Chicago in 1893. The first issue was launched in April 1895. Sonneschein sold the magazine in 1898, but retained editorship. The last issue was printed in August 1899.

== Publications ==
Many different magazines were created for the “everyday” American women, such as the “Ladies Home Journal, Woman’s Home Companion, Good Housekeeping and the Homemaker,” but none of them brought in the perspective of Jewish women. Due to this, “a journal that modeled itself on one of the popular magazines read by Protestant counterparts but still contained enough that was central to Jewish concerns, might well appeal to the upwardly mobile Americanized… Jewish woman.” It was from this prototype that The American Jewess was born.

The topics in The American Jewess publications spanned across spectrums of political, feminist, and religious ideals. Some of the perspectives best reflected in the periodical are the editorials released by Rosa Sonneschein, the editor and creator of the magazine from the start and end of its publication. Sonneschein often “used her editorial pages to advance her views on virtually any subject” but mostly “ she dwelt primarily on 5 topics: the responsibility of Judaism to Jewish women; the responsibility of Jewish women to themselves and to Jewish family life and culture; the responsibility of American Jews to the United States; the identification and eradication of anti-Semitism; and the promotion of Zionism." In the midpoint of the magazines life, “April, 1897,” the American Jewess published a piece in support of the “New York City teachers who were fighting for equal pay." Sonneschein “urged all women workers to “force” their employers to end” discrimination in the workforce. Sonneschein was a strong advocate for women's rights, and reflected this in her pieces by expressing her expectation that the Jewish Reform movement would “expand its recognition of women's equality and to support full enfranchisement of women in their synagogues." For example, she acknowledged the “progressive position of Reform Judaism in its liturgy and rituals, particularly for its replacement of the Bar Mitzvah ceremony” due to the fact that it “ignored the role of girls, with the occasion of confirmation, which included them."

== Online ==
The periodical was assembled and digitized for online access by OCLC from copies held by the Jewish Women's Archive, Hebrew Union College's Jewish Institute of Religion Klau Library, Brandeis University Libraries, and the Library of Congress. The online version is hosted by the University of Michigan.
