= New Mount Sinai Cemetery =

- U.S. National Register of Historic Places
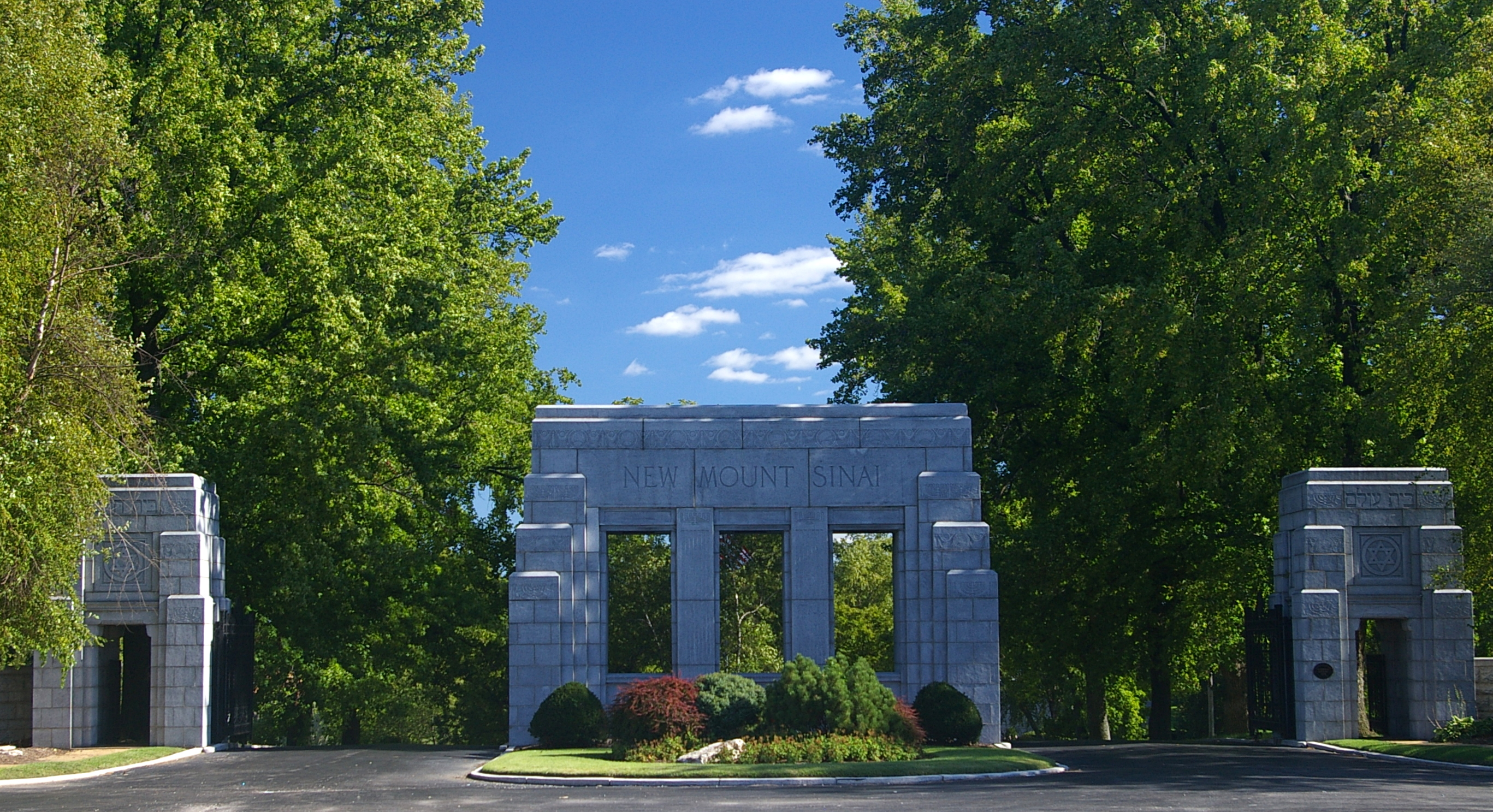

- Location within St. Louis Location within Missouri Location within the United States
- Location: 8430 Gravois Rd., Affton, Missouri
- Coordinates: 38°33′25″N 90°18′20″W
- Area: 28 acres (11 ha)
- Architect: Pitzman, Julius; et al.
- Architectural style: Greek Revival, Classical Revival
- NRHP reference No.: 05001434
- Added to NRHP: December 22, 2005

New Mount Sinai Cemetery is a 52-acre (21 ha) cemetery in St. Louis, Missouri. Its first burial was in 1853, and its rural cemetery landscape design was laid out in 1907. It was listed on the National Register of Historic Places in 2005. As of the 2005 listing, the cemetery also has a Modern-style community mausoleum, three private mausoleums (Art Deco, Modern, Neo-Classical), and a formal Japanese garden.

Its listing includes 39 contributing buildings, 2 contributing sites, and 2 other contributing structures. Deemed as contributing resources were:

- the 52-acre (21 ha) rural cemetery itself,
- its traditional, old Jewish graveyard, which are sections A, B, and F of the cemetery,
- the red granite and wrought iron gate,
- the monumental Art Deco entrance gate,
- Greek Revival chapel,
- Queen Anne "House of Comfort" building,
- 37(?) small mausoleums in Greek Revival, Egyptian Revival, Classical Revival, Art Deco, Modern styles.

== History ==
The cemetery has a chapel, built in 1905, which is no longer in use. It has a storage vault below to temporarily hold 4 caskets. The building housing the office, built in 1916, was originally a rest house and luncheon spot to accommodate the horse drawn funerals that took an entire day.

There have been 10,925 people buried in the cemetery as of December 31, 2009. Besides the public mausoleum and single graves, there are 1,441 platted family lots, 40 private mausoleums, 2 memorial mausoleums, and 24 sarcophagi. The newest section of the cemetery, encompassing 5.5 acres of single graves and family lots, opened in the spring of 2008.
