= 1 New York Plaza =

Office skyscraper in Manhattan, New York

One New York Plaza
- Viewed from the west in 2026

General information
- Status: Completed
- Type: Office
- Architectural style: Modernist
- Location: 1 New York Plaza, Manhattan, New York 10004, U.S.
- Coordinates: 40°42′08″N 74°00′42″W
- Construction started: 1967
- Completed: 1969
- Opening: 1970
- Renovated: 2014
- Owner: China Investment Corporation (49%); Brookfield Office Properties (35%); AEW Capital Management (15%)
- Landlord: Brookfield Office Properties

Height
- Roof: 640 ft (200 m)

Technical details
- Floor count: 50
- Floor area: 2,556,000 square feet (237,500 m^{2})
- Lifts/elevators: 45

Design and construction
- Architects: Kahn & Jacobs, Lescaze & Associates
- Developer: Atlas-McGrath
- Structural engineer: Aaron Garfinkel & Associates
- Main contractor: George A. Fuller Company

Website
- www.onenewyorkplaza.info

1 New York Plaza is an office building in the Financial District of Manhattan in New York City, at the intersection of South and Whitehall Streets near South Ferry. The building, measuring 640 feet (200 m) tall with 50 floors, is the southernmost skyscraper in Lower Manhattan. It was designed by William Lescaze & Assocs. and Kahn & Jacobs, and developed by Sol Atlas and John P. McGrath.

The facade was designed by Nevio Maggiora, consisting of a boxlike "beehive" pattern with the windows recessed within, made of aluminum-clad wall elements resembling a type of elevator button popular at the time of construction. There is a 40,000-square-foot (3,700 m^{2}) retail concourse on the lower level.

== History ==
=== Construction and early years ===
In 1959, the City of New York attempted to acquire the land under this development through eminent domain as part of the Battery Park Urban Renewal Area. The plan involved consolidating several blocks into a "superblock" for public housing. When that plan fell through, the city hoped to entice the New York Stock Exchange to relocate to the property. However, the owner of the property—the firm of Atlas McGrath—successfully sued to retain their land, claiming they were more than willing to develop the site privately.

Shortly after groundbreaking, Chase Manhattan Bank signed a 30-year, $200 million lease for 1.062 million square feet (98,700 m^{2}) of space across 22 floors in the building. Investment bank Salomon Brothers was another early tenant, moving into the building in 1970. On August 5, 1970, the building suffered a fire in which two people were killed and 35 injured. The cause of the fire was a faulty computer connection across from the office of the Townsend-Greenspan firm, which Alan Greenspan owned. The deaths were caused after an occupied elevator was "summoned" to the burning floor when one of the touch-sensitive call buttons reacted instead to the effects of the fire on that floor.

Insurance brokerage Thomson & McKinnon Auchincloss Kohlmeyer signed a lease for 115,000 square feet (10,700 m^{2}) on the building's 47th through 49th floors in February 1975. At the time, the building was reportedly 95% occupied. In March 1978, investment bank First Boston signed a lease for 191,000 square feet (17,700 m^{2}) in the building, relocating from nearby 20 Exchange Place.

=== Chase ownership ===
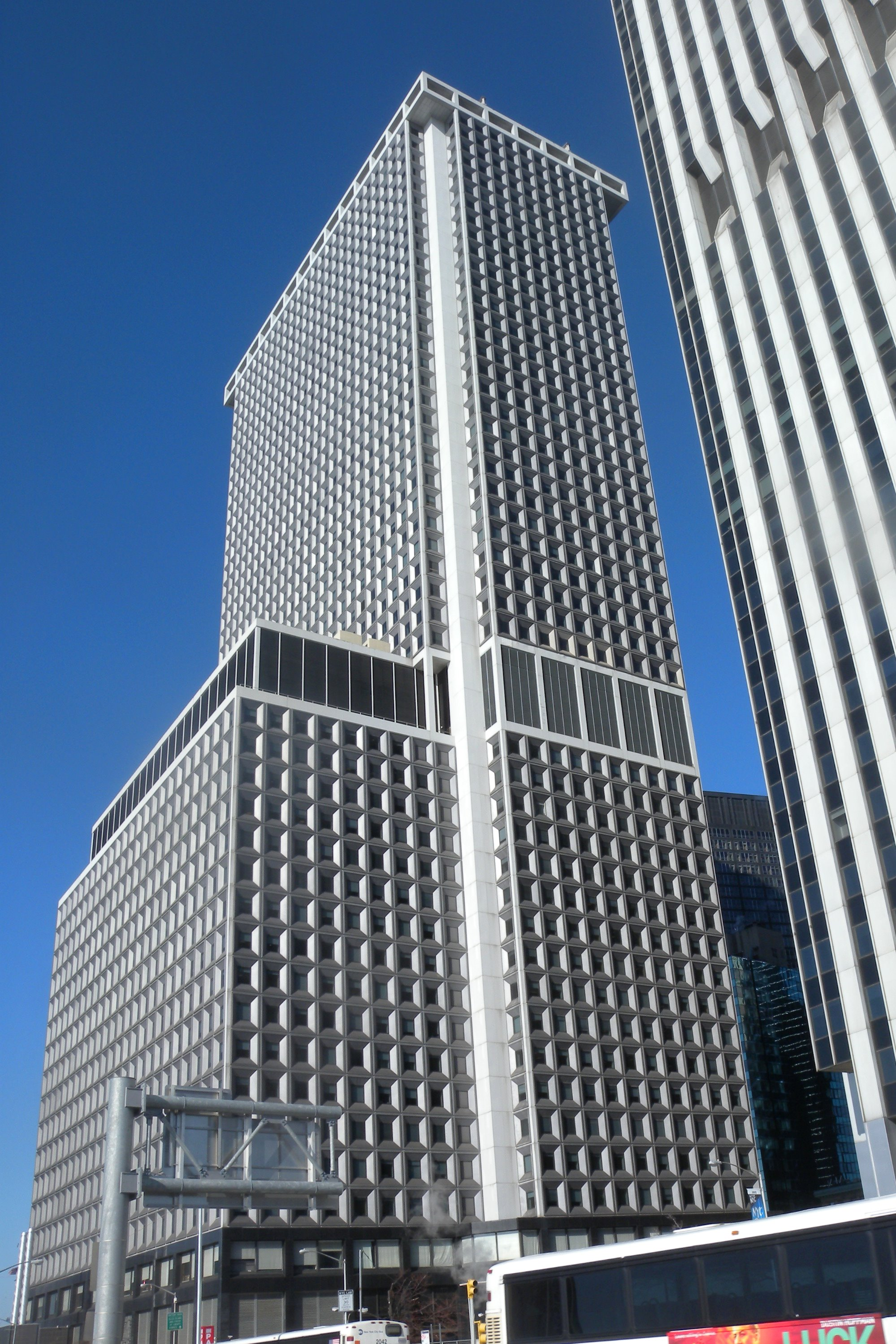
South and east facades

In 1989, Chase purchased the building for $140 million. However, in 1991 Chase moved much of its staff from the building to MetroTech Center in Downtown Brooklyn and Salomon Brothers left for 7 World Trade Center. With the additional loss of Thomson & McKinnon, which had declared bankruptcy, 1.7 million square feet (160,000 m^{2}) of the building were vacant.

Chase renovated the building in the early 1990s, spending $50 million to improve the lobby, elevator cabs and plaza and an additional $50 million on asbestos removal. Shortly afterward, Prudential Securities signed a lease for over 1 million square feet (93,000 m^{2}) of space in the building. The company received at least $106 million in tax breaks and incentives for the move and invested over $147 million in the space to build a data center, trading floor and special generators to ensure power to the building.

Two years later, in 1994, Prudential expanded by leasing another 145,000 square feet (13,500 m^{2}) in the building. The same year, Goldman Sachs leased 425,000 square feet (39,500 m^{2}) of space in the building.

=== Trizec Properties ownership ===
In 1999, Canadian real estate company Trizec Properties purchased the building for $390 million from Chase Manhattan Bank. One New York Plaza's air-conditioning chiller depends on Con Ed's New York City steam system. On August 11, 2001, a steam turbine failed in the basement, and the damage from the resulting explosion disrupted Goldman's market-making NASDAQ activities for the day.

In 2003, Prudential Securities was acquired by Wachovia causing the combined company to offer all 1.3 million square feet (120,000 m^{2}) of its space in the building for sublease. Morgan Stanley signed a lease for 648,000 square feet (60,200 m^{2}) of Prudential's former office space in June 2005. The company committed to moving 2,300 employees to the building and received $11 million in tax incentives from New York State. Around the same time, the law firm Fried Frank renewed their 380,000 square feet (35,000 m^{2}) space on the building's 22nd–30th floors.

Lehman Brothers and Goldman Sachs provided a $400 million commercial mortgage-backed security mortgage on the building in 2006. That same year, Brookfield Office Properties acquired Trizec Properties, becoming the new owners of 1 New York Plaza.

In April 2012, Morgan Stanley expanded to 1.153 million square feet (107,100 m^{2}) of space in a lease that runs through 2029. The new space was formerly occupied by Goldman Sachs until it consolidated into the recently completed 200 West Street in 2011. After the expansion, the building was about 85% occupied.

=== Hurricane Sandy and recent history ===
In October 2012, the building was heavily damaged by Hurricane Sandy when an estimated 28 million US gallons (110,000 kl) of water flooded the lower levels of the building. The retail concourse was submerged and needed to be completely gut-renovated. Office tenants were allowed to return starting November 17, 2012, and the retail concourse reopened in the winter of 2014.

In March 2014, the National Association of Insurance Commissioners moved their headquarters to a 19,218 square feet (1,785.4 m^{2}) space on the building's 42nd floor. Around the same time, Revlon moved into 91,164 square feet (8,469.4 m^{2}) on the top two floors of the building that had previously served as Goldman Sachs' trading floors. The same year, architectural design firm Davis Brody Bond also moved into 26,354 square feet (2,448.4 m^{2}) on the 42nd floor, the National Futures Association took 36,000 square feet (3,300 m^{2}) on the 43rd floor, and WellCare signed a lease for 68,323 square feet (6,347.4 m^{2}). Macmillan Publishers signed the largest deal of the year at the building, taking 176,121 square feet (16,362.2 m^{2}) across the 45th through 48th floors for their Science and Education division. After the flurry of deals, the building ended the year 99% occupied.

The building's retail concourse reopened in the winter of 2015 after a three year, $14 million redesign. New tenants in the space included Starbucks, Chipotle Mexican Grill, Chopt, and Gateway Newstands.

In March 2016, Wells Fargo provided a $750 million mortgage on the building. Two months later, the China Investment Corporation (CIC), a sovereign wealth fund, paid $700 million for a 49% stake in the building from Brookfield, valuing the property at over $1.4 billion. At the end of the year, AEW Capital Management acquired a roughly 15% stake from Brookfield for $232.2 million at the same $1.4 billion valuation. Brookfield refinanced the building in December 2020 with a $835 million mortgage from BMO Harris Bank, Goldman Sachs, and Wells Fargo, replacing Wells Fargo's earlier mortgage. In April 2022, Brookfield and CIC placed One New York Plaza for sale, amid declining demand for office space in New York City. The building's co-owners withdrew their offer to sell the building in January 2023.

== Tenants ==
Notable former occupants of One New York Plaza include Salomon Brothers and Goldman Sachs. Current tenants are Fried, Frank, Harris, Shriver & Jacobson Morgan Stanley, Nature Publishing Group, and Revlon.

== See also ==
- 2 New York Plaza
- List of tallest buildings in New York City
