= Sidney Jacobson =

Sidney Jacobson may refer to:

- Sydney Jacobson, Baron Jacobson (1908–1988), British journalist
- Sidney Jacobson (businessman) (1918–2005), American founder of MSC Industrial Direct
- Sid Jacobson (1929–2022), American writer
