= Cross County Center =

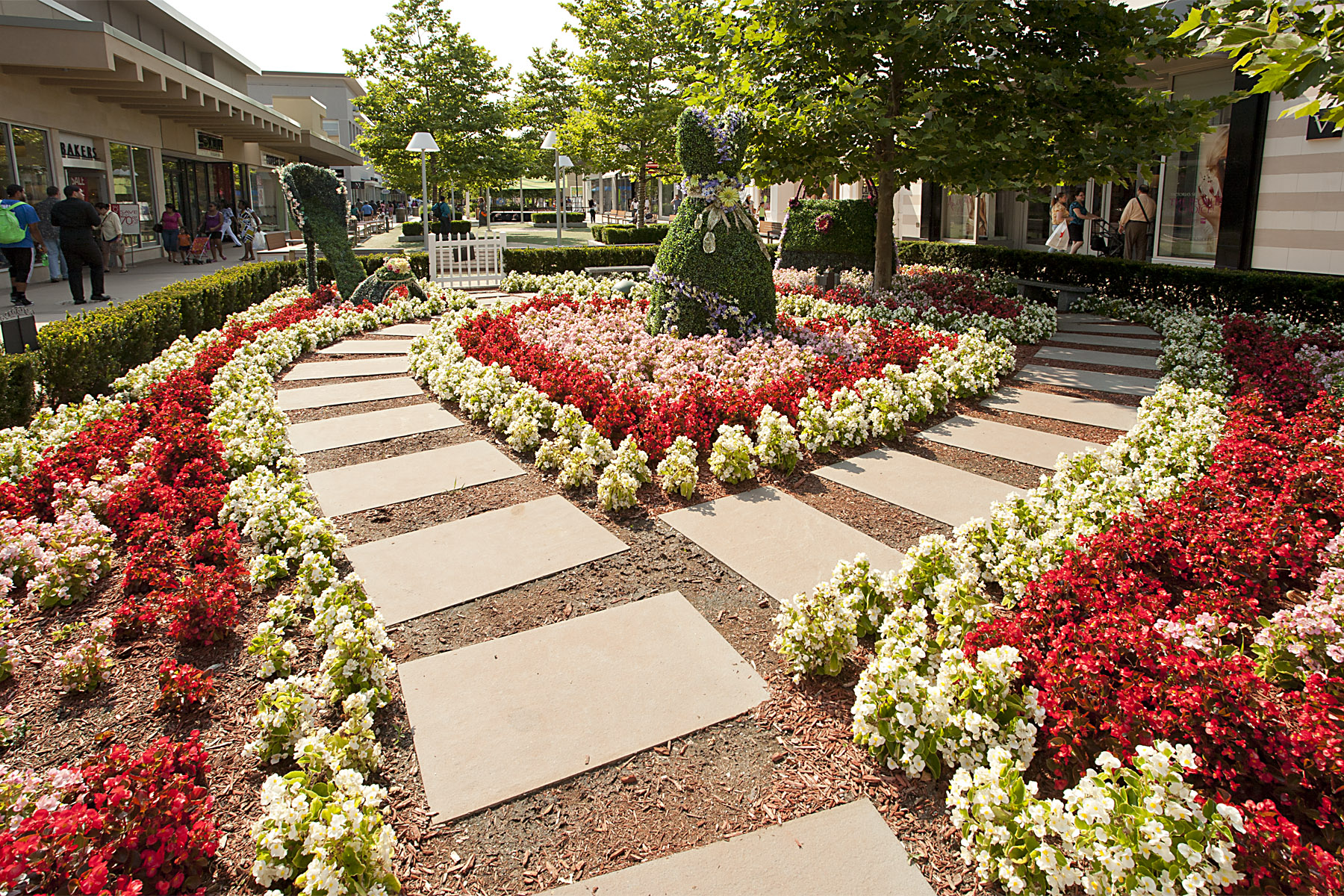
- Cross County Center
- Location: Yonkers, New York, United States
- Coordinates: 40.927286°N 73.854711°W
- Opened: 1954
- Manager: Marx Realty
- Owner: Brooks Shopping Center LLC
- Num. of stores: 100+
- Num. of anchor tenants: 2
- Floor area: 1,000,000 square feet (93,000 m^{2})
- Website: crosscountycenter.com

Cross County Center is an open-air shopping mall located at the junction of the NYS Thruway and Cross County Parkway, in the Kimball neighborhood of Yonkers, New York, United States. The mall is managed by Marx Realty and hosts over 100 stores and restaurants. Anchor stores are Macy's and Target.

== History ==
Developed by Sol Atlas, Cross County Center opened in 1954 as one of the nation's first open-air shopping destinations. Its parking lot was built atop a former peat bog. The 72-acre site included the Cross County Hospital in the middle of the mall campus complete with a rooftop helipad (the hospital closed in the early 1980s).

The original anchor stores were Gimbels (later Stern's, now Macy's), John Wanamaker (later Sears, now Target), and F. W. Woolworth Company. Woolworth operated a main store and a garden store in the mall (the former is now mall space, while the latter was converted to Odd-Job Trading before becoming Old Navy). In September 1954, the women's clothing store Russeks opened a store in the shopping center, selling women's sportswear, dresses, coats, suits, furs, millinery, and accessories, as well as children's coats and dresses. The 1981 CBS TV movie Bill starring Mickey Rooney had the scene with Santa Claus filmed here.

Starting in 2007, Cross County Center underwent a new development and upgrade overseen by The Macerich Company on behalf of the mall's owners, which was completed in 2012. The huge building that now houses Macy's Department Store (that was initially Gimbel's and then Stern's) has been enlarged by one third. It also features a new covered parking lot that is almost as large as the store; the underground loading complex has also been enlarged. The buildings housing the stores on Mall Walk have been renovated and look different, externally, than they did previously, and the catwalk around some second floor stores has been permanently removed. All of the smaller stores, such a those that housed cookie shops and lingerie stores, have been demolished. Nearby buildings have been extended, and one parking lot now faces several large stores.

The former Cross County Hospital and Office building was reconstructed for a Hyatt Place hotel, with 155 rooms, an indoor pool, cocktails bar, business center and fitness center in 2015.

In 2010, Red Lobster opened, and in 2015, Olive Garden and Longhorn Steakhouse restaurants opened. On the north side of the mall, Wilsker's restaurant was located, and it was a diner.

On June 6, 2019, it was announced that Sears would shutter as part of an ongoing decision to eliminate its brick-and-mortar format. Target signed a 40-year lease for 132,000 sq. ft. of space in the previous Sears anchor store. On September 13, 2023, Target announced that they will open their first store on October 22 on the location of the former Sears store. The store had its ribbon cut on October 18, and opened 4 days later.

The mall has long been owned by Brooks Shopping Center LLC, jointly owned by Marx Realty and Benenson Capital Partners, and was managed by Macerich since 2006. On January 17, 2020, Westfair Communications reported that Marx Realty took over the mall's leasing and management from Macerich.

In late 2021, it was announced that Westchester Community College would expand their current Yonkers campus by opening at Cross County on the third floor of the former Sears anchor. WCC will add 30,000 square feet of space, using it to build new lab spaces, and new design school, and expand their current academic offerings at the campus. The WCC expansion opened in November 2022.

== The Mall at Cross County ==
Adjacent to Cross County Center, at 750 Central Park Avenue, is a shopping center called The Mall at Cross County, which hosts a variety of stores and a large covered parking garage. Current tenants include Michaels, Marshalls, T.J. Maxx, HomeGoods, and Micro Center.

The mall first opened in 1987 as Cross County Square and had different stores than today, such as Thriftway Drug, Finders Keepers, Crazy Eddie, plus various specialty stores and restaurants.

Before 2009, the mall also hosted a Circuit City on the second floor. In 2010, Micro Center opened where the Circuit City was.

In 2017, it was announced that, as part of a $10,000,000 renovation to the mall, Century 21 would open a store which covered up the whole interior part of the mall, closing all of the previous tenants mentioned above. On September 10, 2020, it was announced that Century 21 would be closing all of its stores, including the Mall at Cross County location. In November 2022, Burlington opened a store in the space formerly occupied by Century 21.

The National Wholesale Liquidators location, which was housed in a separate structure attached to the rest of the mall, closed in 2017 after a construction accident occurred when a front-loader fell through the unused portion of the roof parking deck on top of the store. The building was subsequently condemned and demolished, with plans to rebuild a new store. However, no timeline was disclosed for the construction of the new store, and as of 2021, the lot is still empty and construction has not begun.

== Gallery ==
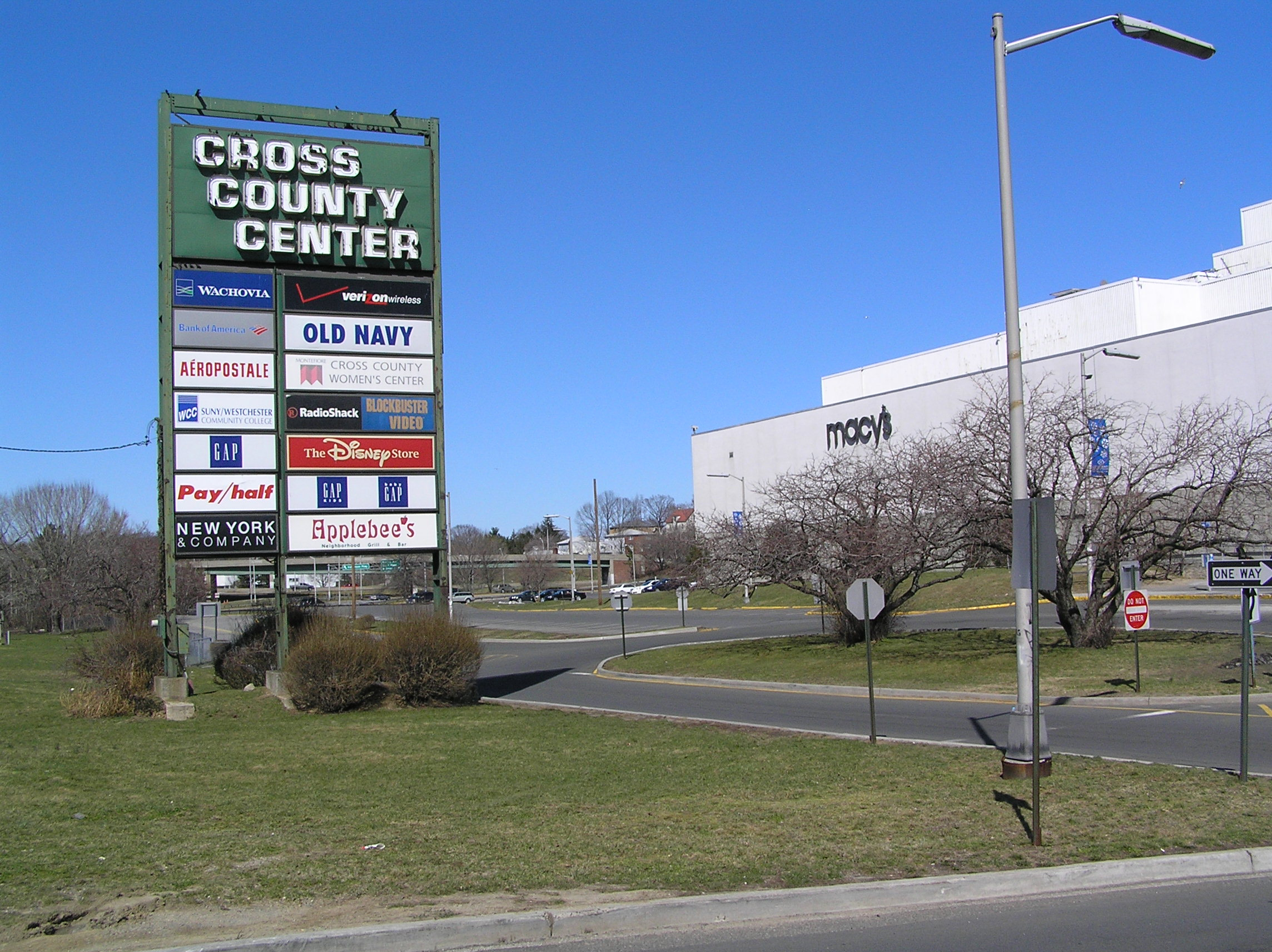
The iconic former marquee of the Cross County Center with Macy's in the background

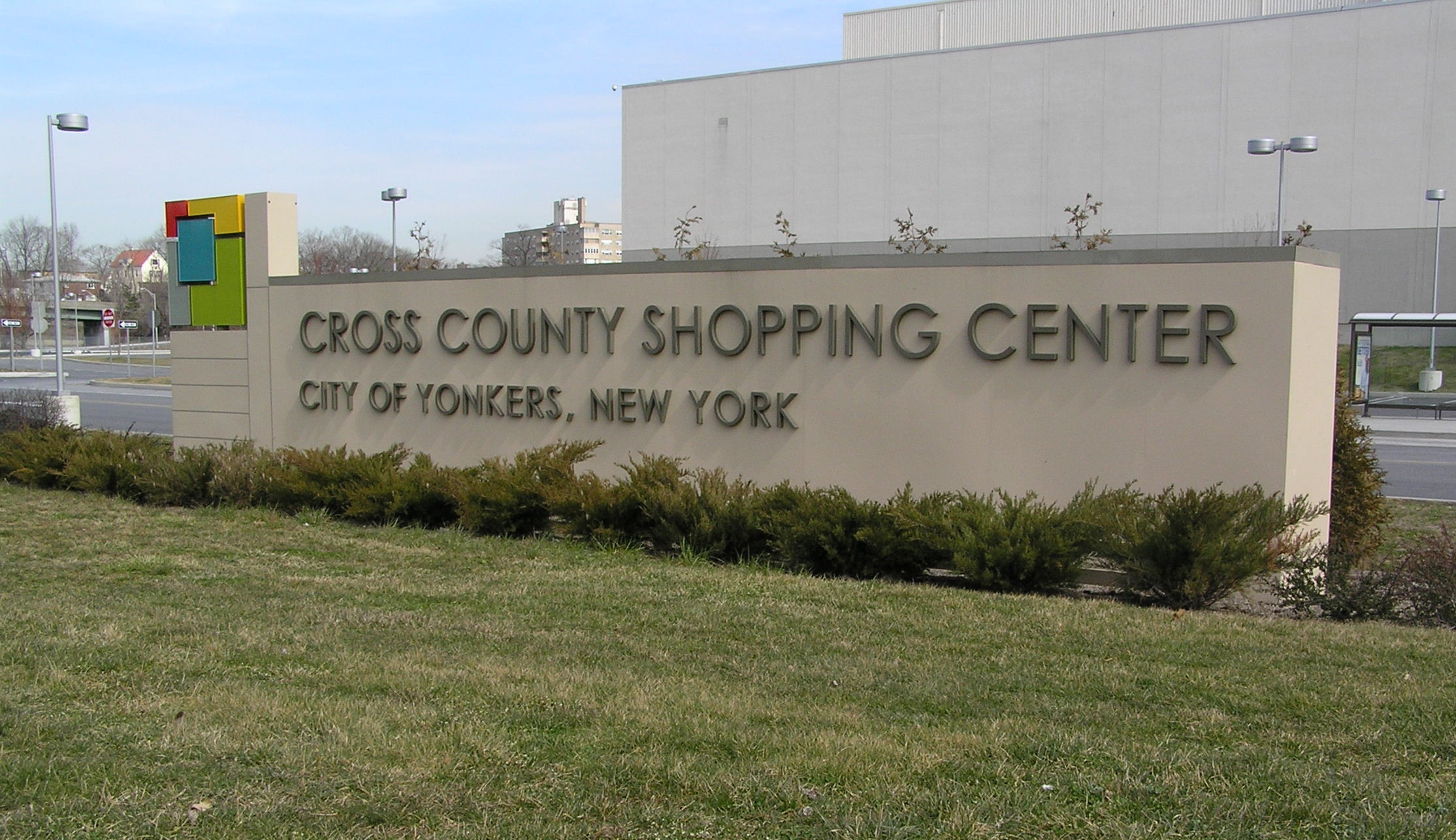
New entrance sign

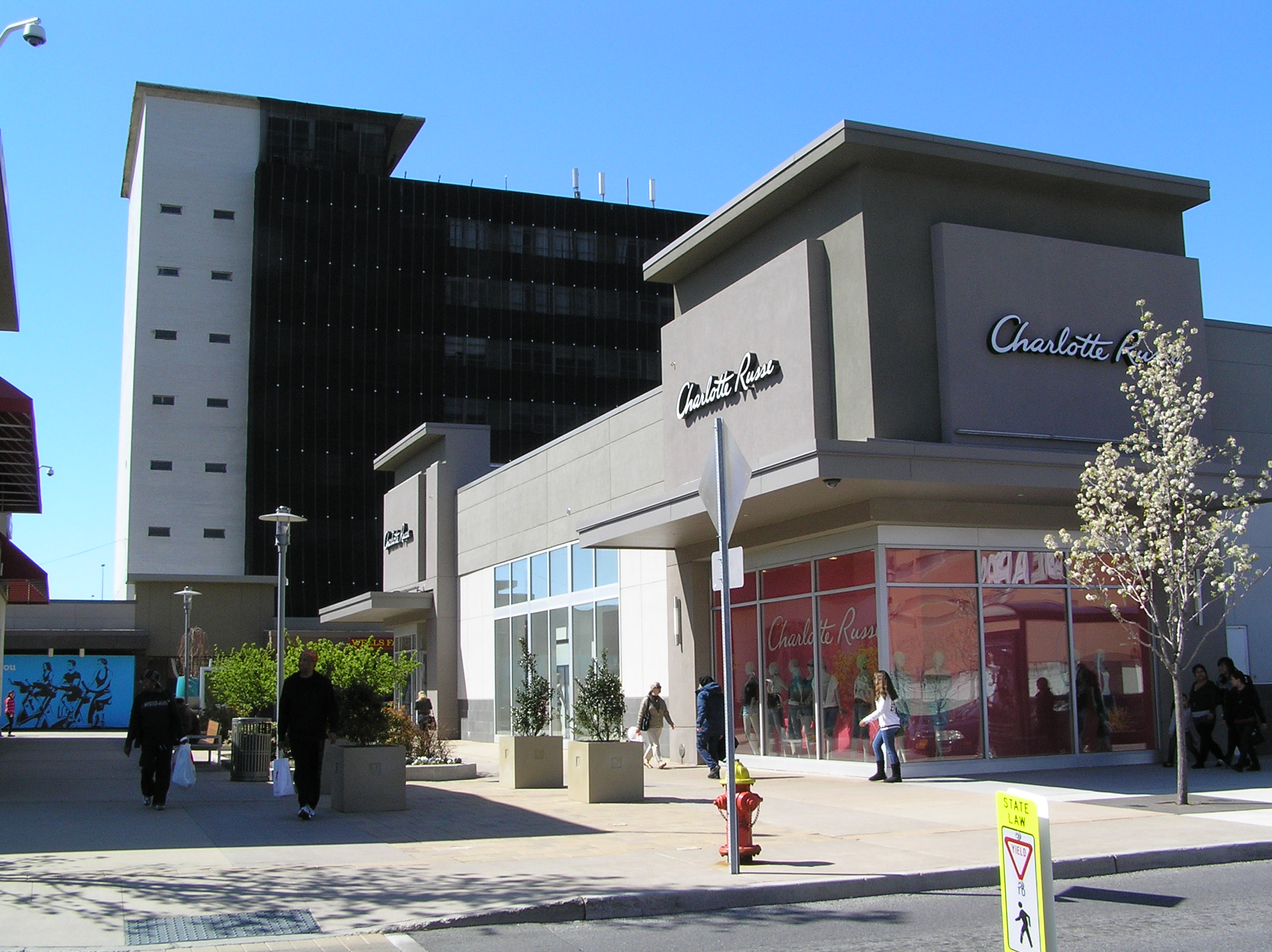
The new mall

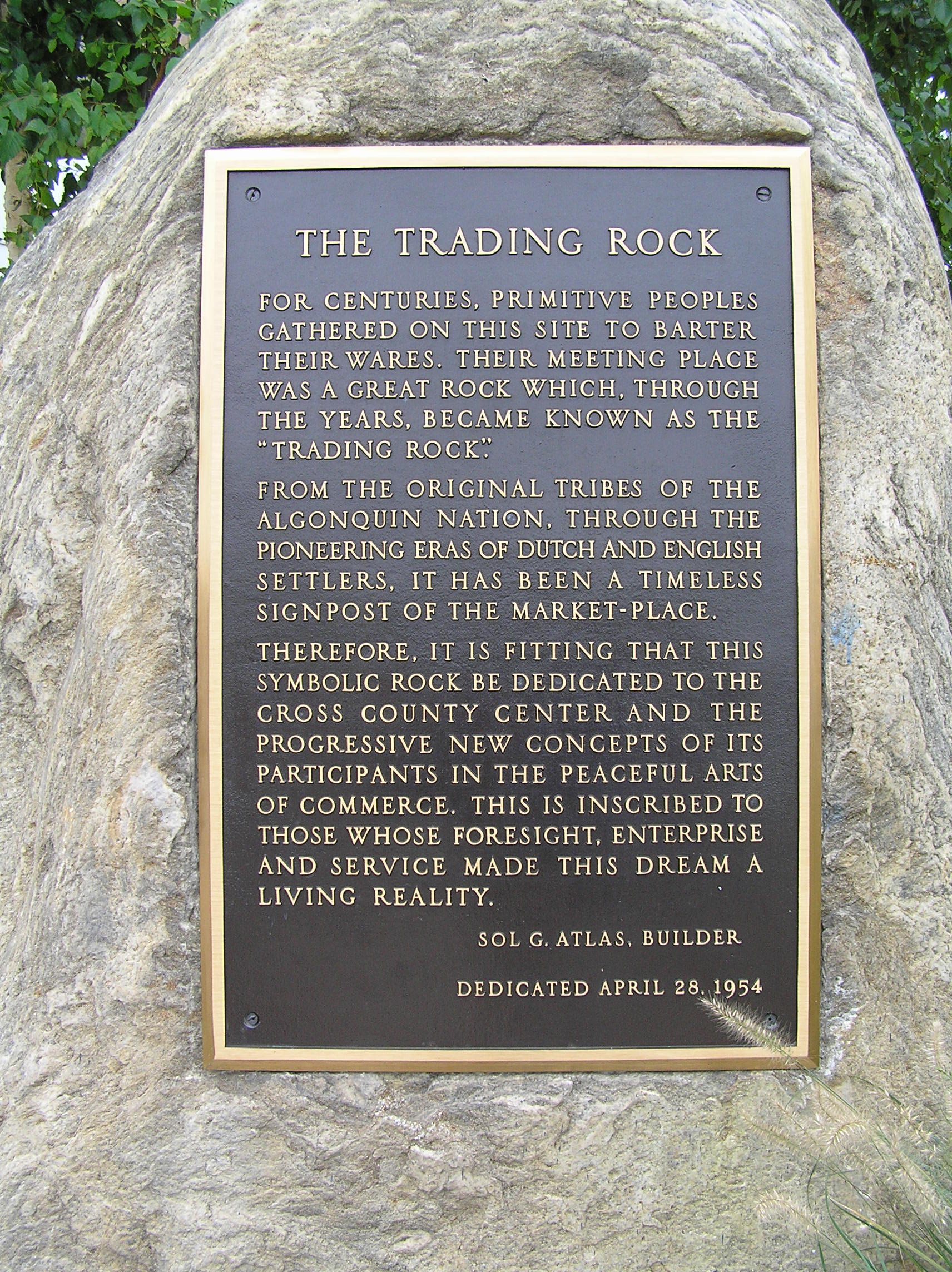
The trading rock

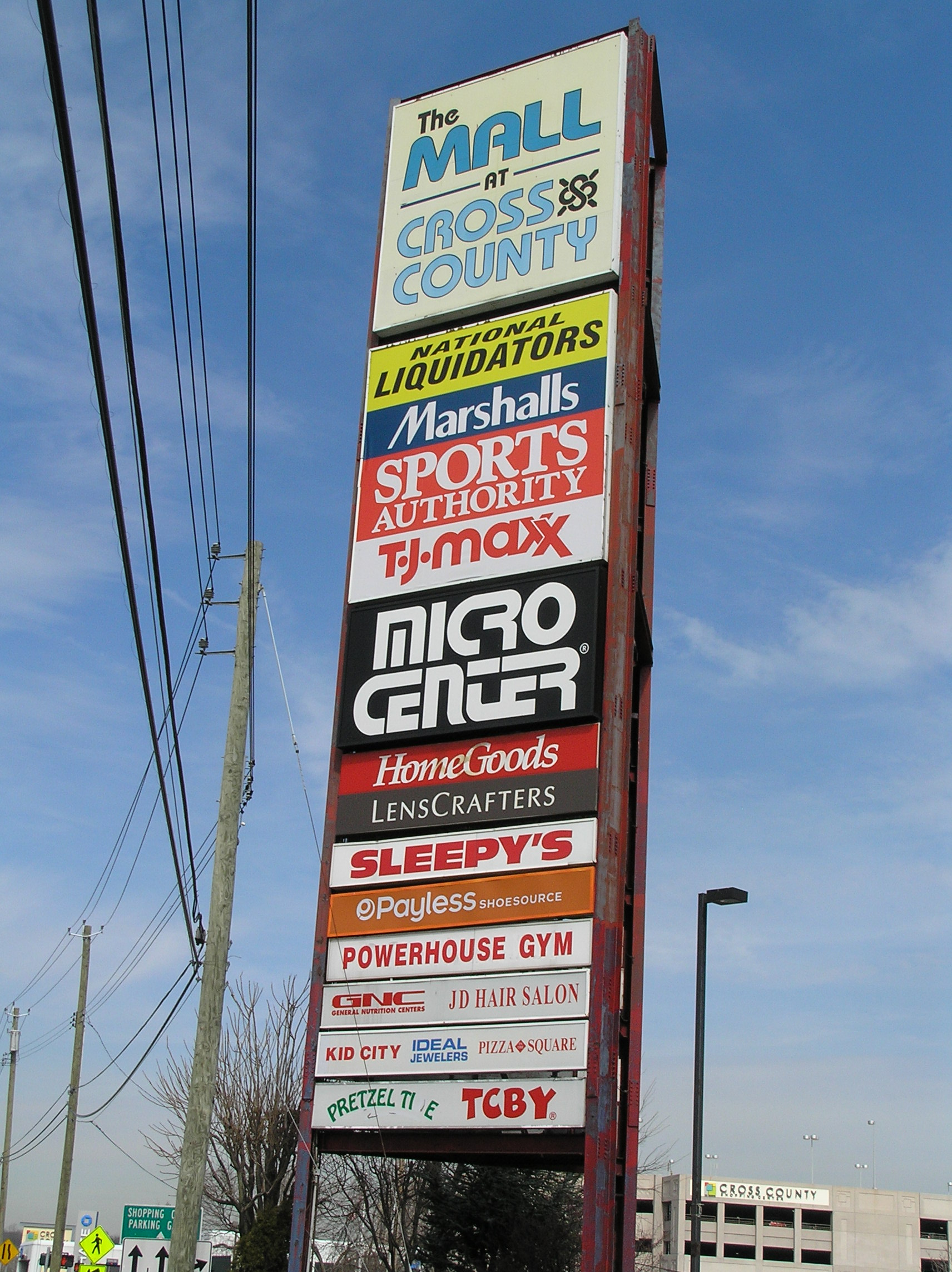
Marquee at The Mall at Cross County

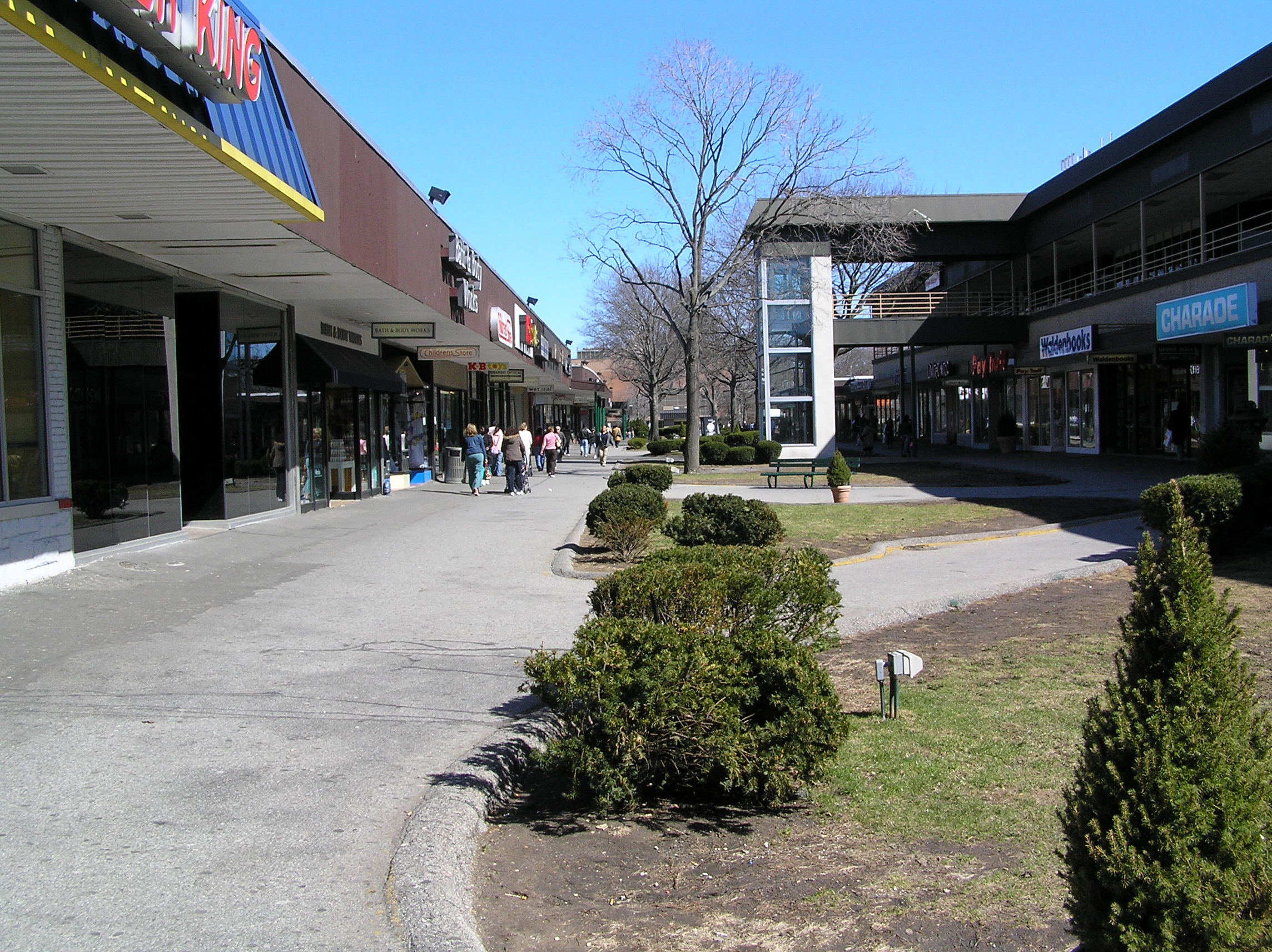
The mall walk before the start of the reconstruction project
