= Temple Beth-El (Great Neck, New York) =

Reform synagogue in Great Neck, New York, US

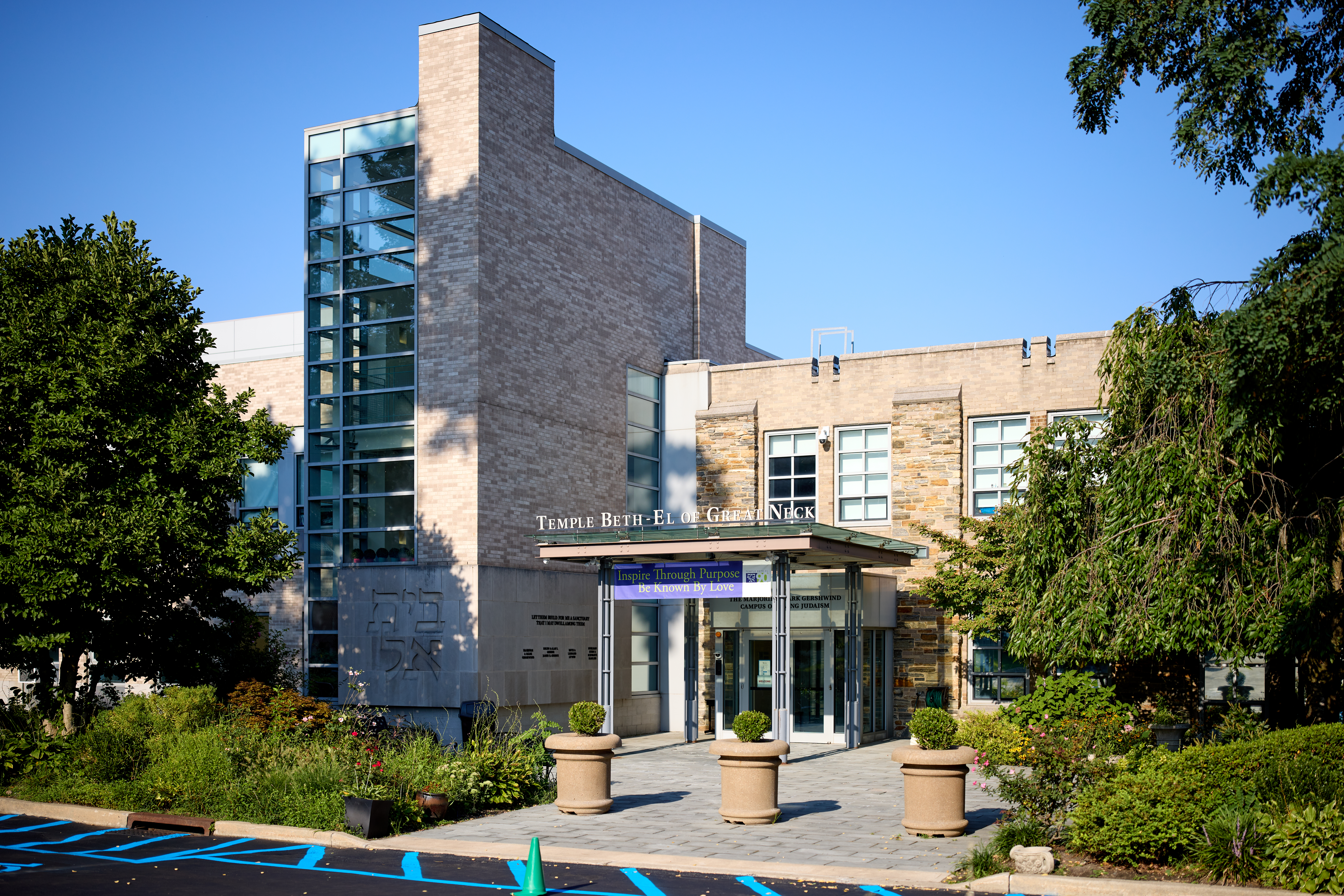
- Entrance to Temple Beth-El in 2022

- Location on Long Island, in New York (state)

Religion
- Affiliation: Reform Judaism
- Ecclesiastical or organisational status: Synagogue
- Leadership: Rabbi A. Brian Stoller; Rabbi Megan Brumer, Asst. Rabbi
- Status: Active

Location
- Location: 5 Old Mill Road, Great Neck, Long Island, Nassau County, New York
- Country: United States
- Coordinates: 40°47′53″N 73°44′10″W

Architecture
- Established: 1928 (as a congregation)
- Completed: 1932

Website
- tbegreatneck.org

Temple Beth-El is a Reform Jewish synagogue located at 5 Old Mill Road in the village of Great Neck, Long Island, Nassau County, New York, in the United States. Founded in 1928, it is the oldest synagogue in Great Neck.

In 2025 it had 400 members according to its senior rabbi, A. Brian Stoller. Their cantor emerita is Lisa Hest, mother of singer-songwriter Ari Hest.

== History ==
The temple was founded in 1928 when 86 organizing members began meeting at local church. Rabbi David Goodis served as the congregation's first rabbi, but only briefly before he died in 1930. His successor, Rabbi Jacob Phillip Rudin, served for four decades establishing the temple as one of the most prominent synagogues in the United States.

The temple erected its original building on Old Mill Road in 1932. The original Temple building was enlarged three times over 60 years once in 1950 and again in 1970.

The 1970 main sanctuary addition is a large, windowless box in the brutalist style. Seating 900 in three levels, it features a tall open lobby, gallery and stairwell adjoining the worship space. A large pipe organ is lofted above the front of the all white space. Spanning the entire back wall of the bima and incorporating the Torah ark is an installation by artist Louise Nevelson entitled, "White Flame of the Six Million."

Rabbi Rudin retired in 1971; Rabbi Jerome Davidson, who had been assistant rabbi since 1958, took over and served as senior rabbi until 2007. Rabbi Davidson's son, Rabbi Joshua Davidson, born in the Great Neck congregation, went on to lead Congregation Emanu-El of New York.

Some members of the congregation left in 1940 to form a Conservative synagogue, Temple Israel of Great Neck, which was led for many years by the prominent rabbi Mordecai Waxman. A Reform spinoff, Temple Emanuel of Great Neck, formed in 1953.

In 1994, the congregation hired Karen Bender, a lesbian, as an assistant rabbi. When she and her life partner decided to celebrate a commitment ceremony in California, Davidson agreed to officiate at a blessing ceremony at Temple Beth-El. Controversy within the congregation over this decision led to Davidson's well-publicized decision not only to continue to officiate for gay unions, but also to begin officiating at interfaith weddings and to push for the Reform rabbinate to pursue means of Jewish support for mixed marriages.

Temple Beth-El of Great Neck has a rich cantorial tradition. Cantors who have served at the temple include: John P. Hardt, Robert Harmon, Robert Bloch, Barbara Ostfeld, the first woman to be ordained a cantor and more recently, Vladimir Lapin and Adam Davis. It currently has a cantorial soloist.

The building underwent drastic renovation following a fire in 2001 that significantly damaged the property. Since the fire, Temple Beth-El has continued to go through renovations, including those to repair flood damage from Hurricane Isaias in 2020.

At its height, the synagogue membership boasted over 1,500 families, though the trends of aging membership and demographic changes on the Great Neck Peninsula halved it to 875 families by 2009 and 620 in 2018.

The COVID-19 crisis in 2020 and shrinking enrollment in both synagogues’ programs, Temple Beth-El of Great Neck's Religious School merged with that of Temple Israel of Great Neck to form the Kulanu Religious School led by Rabbi Amy Roth. The partnership ended in 2023 and The Kehillah Project religious school program was started as Temple Beth-El's own program, under the leadership of Rabbi Megan Brumer.

In 2020, co-Senior Rabbis Meir and Tara Feldman announced they would leave the congregation mid-contract in 2022 after serving 11 years in order to move to Israel.

In May 2024, a strategic visioning team was formed to plan for its future. One new focus was to become the leader in synagogue-based adult Jewish education and cultural arts on Long Island. Thanks to the philanthropic support of temple members, the temple launched the Susan Stumer Cultural Arts Center and the Moses & Miriam Center for Pluralistic Adult Jewish Learning. In 2025, adult education and cultural arts offerings attracted more attendees than any other synagogue on Long Island.

Temple Beth-El of Great Neck's once award-winning Early Childhood Education Center, last led by Karen Wasserman, was closed after six decades, as announced to the congregation on March 5, 2025, and in a June 3, 2025 sermon by which time membership had fallen to 400 units.

As part of the efforts of the strategic visioning team to ensure a strong future and financial foundation to move forward, an April 29, 2025 announcement to the synagogue membership shared plans to sell its building to a Sephardic community yeshiva and leaseback a smaller footprint on their historic campus. A June 3, 2025 update to the congregation announced a possible consolidation with Temple Tikvah of Hyde Park would not move forward.

== Notable members ==
- Sol Atlas (1907–1973), real estate developer
- Oscar Brand (1920–2016) American-Canadian singer
- Joshua Davidson, a rabbi who led Congregation Emanu-El of New York
- Erica Groshen (1954–) Former Commissioner of Labor Statistics and head of the US Bureau of Labor Statistics
- Sidney Jacobson (1918–2005), American businessman
- Andy Kaufman (1949–1984) Comedian and actor
- Alfred J. Koeppel (1932–2001), real estate developer
