= Joshua Davidson =

American rabbi

Joshua M. Davidson is an American rabbi. In 2013 he became rabbi of one of America's preeminent congregations, Congregation Emanu-El of New York.

Davidson is the son of Rabbi Jerome Davidson, the long-serving rabbi of Temple Beth-El (Great Neck, New York), where Joshua Davidson was born and reared. Before moving to Temple Emanu-El, Davidson served as rabbi of Temple Beth-El of Chappaqua, New York. Before Chappaqua, Davidson was assistant rabbi at New York's Central Synagogue.

According to the New York Times, Rabbi Davidson has broken with a longstanding aspect of Temple Emanu-El adherence to the older, Classical expression of Reform Judaism by wearing a kippah and tallit.
