= 2 New York Plaza =

Office skyscraper in Manhattan, New York

125 Broad Street
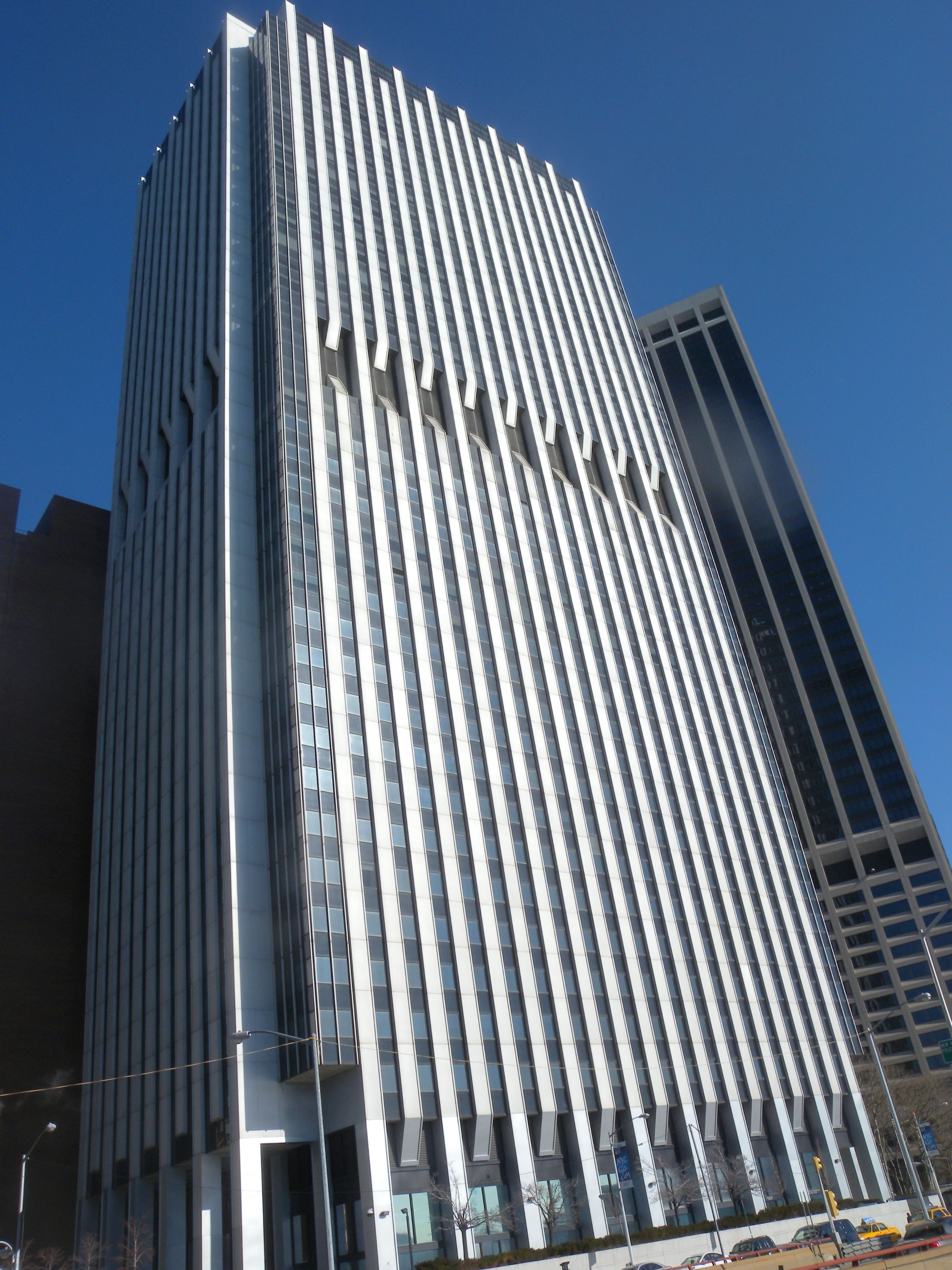
- Interactive map of the 125 Broad Street area
- Former names: 2 New York Plaza

General information
- Status: Completed
- Type: Office
- Architectural style: Modernist
- Location: New York City, New York, United States
- Coordinates: 40°42′09″N 74°00′45″W
- Construction started: 1970
- Completed: 1971
- Owner: Sullivan & Cromwell LLP

Height
- Height: 504 ft (154 m)

Technical details
- Floor count: 40
- Floor area: 1,100,072 sq ft (102,200.0 m^{2})

Design and construction
- Architect: Kahn & Jacobs

125 Broad Street (formerly known as 2 New York Plaza) is an office building in the Financial District of Manhattan in New York City, at the intersection of Broad Street and South Street near South Ferry. The building, standing 504 feet (154 m) tall with 40 floors, is one of the southernmost skyscrapers in Lower Manhattan. The building was designed by the Kahn & Jacobs architecture firm, and developed by Sol Atlas and John P. McGrath.

Construction took place from 1970 to 1971. The building is to the east of 1 New York Plaza, and to the south of 55 Water Street. It has a modern structural design, and is one of a series of modern-style buildings built in the Financial District during the 1960s and 1970s.

Starting in 2007 the managers began incorporating energy saving renovations to meet LEED Silver standards. Building amenities include on-site management, day care, a coffee shop, shoe shine and a 50-car garage.

== Tenants ==
- AECOM
- American Civil Liberties Union
- AXA
- CNA Financial Corporation
- International AIDS Vaccine Initiative
- New York Civil Liberties Union
- Police Benevolent Association of the City of New York
- Sullivan & Cromwell LLP
