= Sol Atlas =

American real estate developer

Sol G. Atlas
- Born: March 15, 1907
- Died: July 30, 1973 (age 66); Manhasset, New York
- Occupation: Real estate developer
- Spouse: Edythe Samuels
- Children: Sandra Atlas Bass
- Parent(s): Fanny "Faigel" Anczkowski Atlas; Abraham Atlas

Sol Geoffrey Atlas (1907–1973) was an American real estate developer.

== Biography ==
Atlas was the son of Fanny "Faigel" (née Anczkowski) and Abraham Atlas (formerly Atlasowicz). He dropped out of high school and went to work with his father. In 1959, he bid $671,000 for Ellis Island and proposed to turn it into a $55 million resort consisting of a 600‐room hotel, marina, music shell, tennis courts, swimming pools and skating rinks; the government turned down his bid. He partnered with John P. McGrath on numerous projects in Manhattan including the 50-story 1 New York Plaza and the 40-story 2 New York Plaza near Battery Park. He was responsible for the Miracle Mile center at Manhasset; the North Shore Center in Great Neck; the Cross County Shopping Center in Yonkers; the Essex Green Shopping Center in West Orange, New Jersey; and the Connecticut Post Mall at Milford, Connecticut. He also built 200 East End Avenue, which was the first air‐conditioned apartment building in the city.

Atlas was a founder of the Inter Council of Shopping Centers; and was a lecturer at Yale University Law School and for the New York Board of Real Estate Appraisers. In 1969, Yeshiva University named him "Man of the Year" and he received the Albert Einstein College of Medicine Founders Award.

He was active in the United Jewish Appeal and the Federation of Jewish Philanthropies.

== Personal life ==
In 1927, he married Edythe Samuels; they had a daughter, Sandra Atlas Bass. Atlas lived in Kings Point, New York. He died of a stroke on July 30, 1973, at North Shore Hospital in Manhasset, New York. Services were held at Temple Beth-El in Great Neck. His wife died in 1978. His daughter is the owner of the Sol G. Atlas Realty Company and is a philanthropist.
