= MSC Industrial Direct =

American distributing company

MSC Industrial Direct Co., Inc
- Company type: Public
- Traded as: NYSE: MSM (Class A); S&P 400 Component
- Industry: Industrial Equipment Wholesale
- Founded: New York, New York (1941)
- Founder: Sidney Jacobson
- Headquarters: Melville, New York, Davidson, North Carolina
- Key people: Mitchell Jacobson, Chairman; Martina McIsaac, President & CEO; Kristen Actis-Grande, EVP & Chief Financial Officer; Beth Bledsoe, SVP & Chief People Officer; John Hill, SVP & Chief Digital Information Officer; Kim Shacklett, SVP, Sales & Customer Success; Neal Dongre, VP, General Counsel & Corporate Secretary; Jim Drohan, VP, Business & Commercial Development
- Revenue: ▼$3.7 billion USDUSD (2022)
- Net income: ▼$340 million USD (2022)
- Number of employees: 7,000-plus (2023)
- Website: www.mscdirect.com

MSC Industrial Direct Co., Inc (MSC), through its subsidiaries, primarily MSC Industrial Supply Co., is one of the largest industrial equipment distributors in the United States, distributing more than 1.5 million metalworking and other industrial products.

== History ==
MSC was founded in 1941 as Sid Tool, Inc., by Sidney Jacobson, in New York's Little Italy. It originally sold cutting tools and accessories to New York City machine shops. The company later moved its headquarters to Plainview, New York.

In 1970, Manhattan Supply Company was acquired and, in 1998, moved its headquarters to Melville, New York, on Long Island. The company currently operates from five regional Customer Fulfillment Centers and 12 branch offices.

In 1997 MSC acquired Enco Manufacturing Company.

On June 8, 2006, MSC completed the acquisition of J & L America, Inc. DBA J & L Industrial Supply (J & L), a subsidiary of Kennametal, for $349.5 million.

In 2013, Erik Gershwind, Sid Jacobson's grandson, was named President and Chief Executive Officer. In 2013 the company opened its co-headquarters office in Davidson, North Carolina, which is located in the Charlotte metropolitan area. The company has expanded to 750 employees at the co-headquarters, with 120 employees making the move to the Carolinas from the Melville office.

In 2013, MSC acquired Barnes Distribution North America to expand its footprint in Canada. The business was renamed Class C Solutions Group.

In 2017, MSC acquired DECO Tool Supply Co., an industrial supply distributor based in Davenport, Iowa, to expand its footprint in the region.

In 2018, MSC acquired All Integrated Solutions, a value-added distributor of industrial fasteners and components, MRO supplies and assembly tools based in Franksville, Wisconsin.

In 2019, MSC completed a transaction with TAC Global Solutions, a Mexican industrial distribution company, to expand into Mexico.

In 2022, MSC acquired Engman-Taylor, a Menomonee Falls, Wisconsin-based distributor of metalworking tools and supplies. That same year, MSC also acquired Tower Fasteners, a Holtsville, New York-based valued-added distributor of Original Equipment Manufacturer (OEM) fasteners and components.

In 2023, MSC acquired Buckeye Industrial Supply Co., an independent metalworking distributor based in Columbus, Ohio, and Tru-Edge Grinding Inc., a St. Henry, Ohio-based custom tool manufacturer.

For the quarter ending in May 2025, MSC Industrial (MSM) posted revenue of $971.15 million, reflecting a 0.8% decline year-over-year. Diluted EPS of $1.02 vs. $1.27 in the prior fiscal year quarter. The company reported Adjusted diluted EPS of $1.08 vs. $1.33 in the prior fiscal year quarter.

In January 2026, Martina McIsaac was named President and Chief Executive Officer.
