= Sidney Jacobson (businessman) =

American businessman (1918–2005)

- Born: 1918
- Died: June 21, 2005 (age 87)
- Occupation: businessman
- Known for: founder of MSC Industrial Direct
- Spouse: Bernice Jacobson
- Children: Mitchell Jacobson; Marjorie Jacobson Gershwind

Sidney Jacobson (1918–2005) was an American businessman who founded industrial equipment distributor MSC Industrial Direct and pioneered the use of computerized inventory management and order processing.

== Biography ==
Jacobson was born to a Jewish family in Brooklyn. At the age of 16, he took a job as a machinist and in 1941, he founded the Sid Tool Company in Little Italy, Manhattan with $1,000 of his own money and $3,000 borrowed from his mother. Sid Tool sold cutting tools to New York City machine shops.

After serving in the Army Air Force during World War II leaving the business first, in the hands of his brother (until he too was drafted) and then his sister while he was gone. He returned to a company with $36,000 in annual sales where he soon landed exclusive contracts with Grumman Corporation and Republic Aircraft. In 1955, he moved the company to Plainview, New York, closer to his home in Great Neck, New York. Sensing that he was overly reliant on the two aerospace companies (they were 90% of sales in the 1960s), he launched a catalog business to diversify his customer base. His colorful catalog (known as "The Big Book") combined with an expansive portfolio of lower cost imported tools purchased at a discount (Sid Tools was the first company in the industry to widely import foreign-manufactured tools) propelled catalog sales which soon exceeded the company's regular sales. After an inventory problem where he ran out of stock of a critical item, Jacobson invested heavily in computerized inventory management and order processing, the first to do so in the industry.

In 1970, Sid Tool purchased the cutting tool marketer, Manhattan Supply Company and changed the name of the company to MSC Industrial Direct, using the initials of Manhattan Supply. In 1978, MSC became one of the first distributors to launch a fully integrated Quality Assurance Department. In 1976, his son Mitchell, a lawyer, joined the company and was tasked with seeking out the best practices at other industrial suppliers to implement at MSC. In 1982, Mitchell replaced his father as president of the company. The company went public in 1995. MSC went on to become one of the largest industrial equipment distributors in the world with $1.87 billion in sales in 2010.

== Philanthropy ==
Jacobson was a strong supporter of the Jewish community giving generously to the UJA-Federation of New York. The Sid Jacobson Jewish Community Center in East Hills, New York, is named in his honor. He served as president of the New York UJA-Federation Palm Beach committee; and served on the boards of directors for both the Mid Island JCC and United JCC's of Long Island. Jacobson was a founder of Long Island Jewish Hospital and served as an associate trustee of North Shore Hospital.

== Personal life ==
Jacobson was married to Bernice Jacobson with whom he had two children: Marjorie Jacobson Gershwind and Mitchell Jacobson. The couple lived in Great Neck, New York, and Palm Beach, Florida. They died together at their home on June 21, 2005, of carbon monoxide poisoning. Their funeral was held at Temple Beth-El in Great Neck.
