= Gateway Newstands =

Canadian convenience store chain

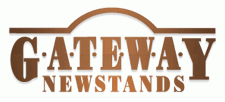
- Type: Subsidiary
- Industry: newsstand
- Founded: 1983
- Headquarters: 240 Chrislea Road, Vaughan, Ontario, Canada
- Number of locations: 500+
- Area served: Canada, United States
- Key people: Mary Kelly - CEO; Kevin Farrell - Chief Operating Officer
- Products: tobacco, lottery, snacks, soft drinks, newspaper
- Parent: Tobmar Investments International Inc.
- Subsidiaries: Bakery on the Go, Cafe on the Go
- Website: Gateway Newstands

Gateway Newstands [sic] is a chain of convenience stores and kiosks in large office buildings, shopping centres, public places, and transit stations in the United States and Canada. Established in 1983, Vaughan, Ontario-based Tobmar Investments International Inc. (known simply as Tobmar) is the company that runs Gateway Newstands. The stores operate as independent franchisees and sell a wide variety of convenience items from tobacco and lottery tickets; to candy, chewing gum, and non-alcoholic beverages; and newspapers and magazines. There are currently over 500 Gateway franchises in the network. In late 2020, Gateway Newstands, along with its affiliate Tobmar Investments International Inc., decided to wind-down operations at its franchise locations in the United States.

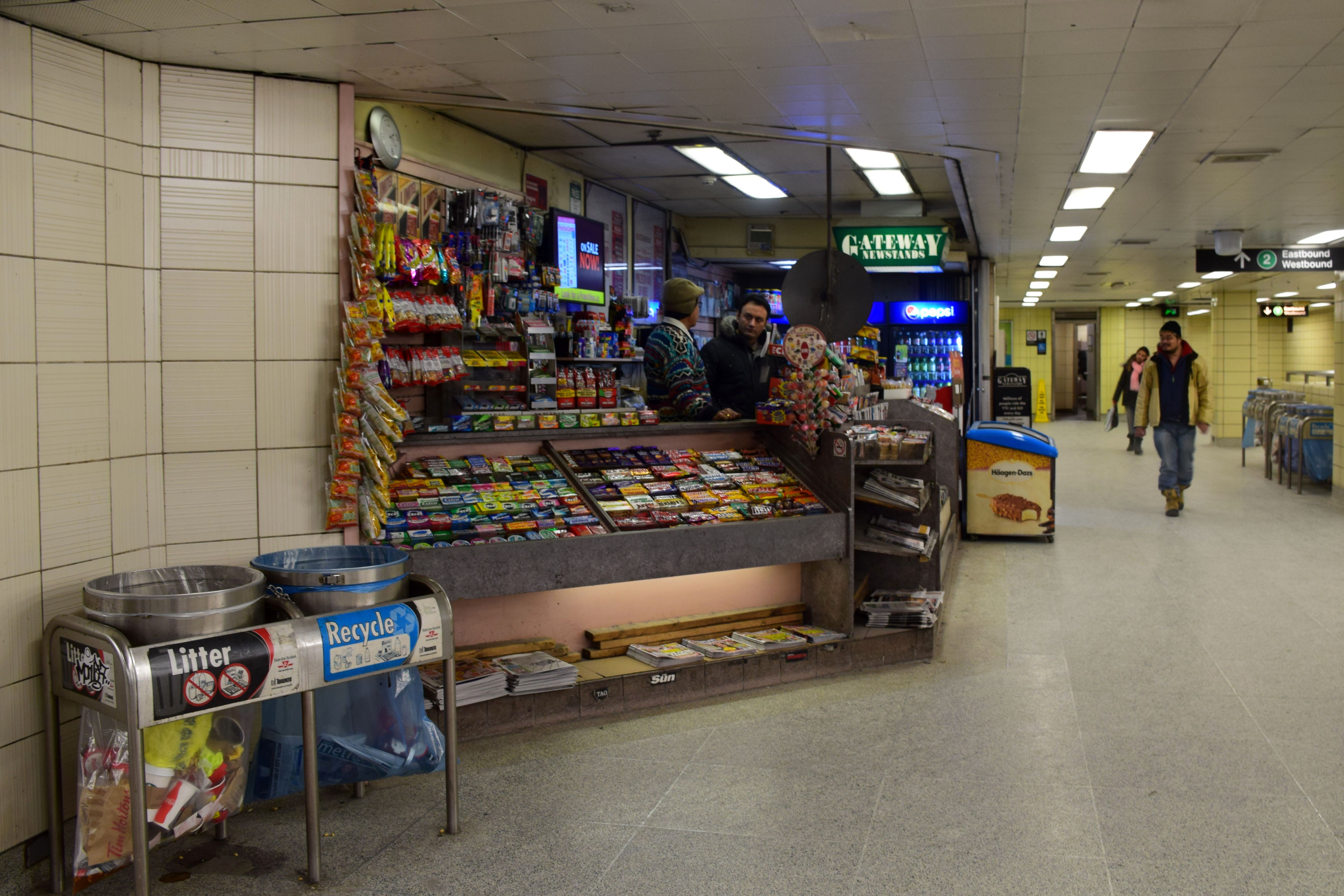
Gateway Newstands at Bloor Yonge subway station in Toronto

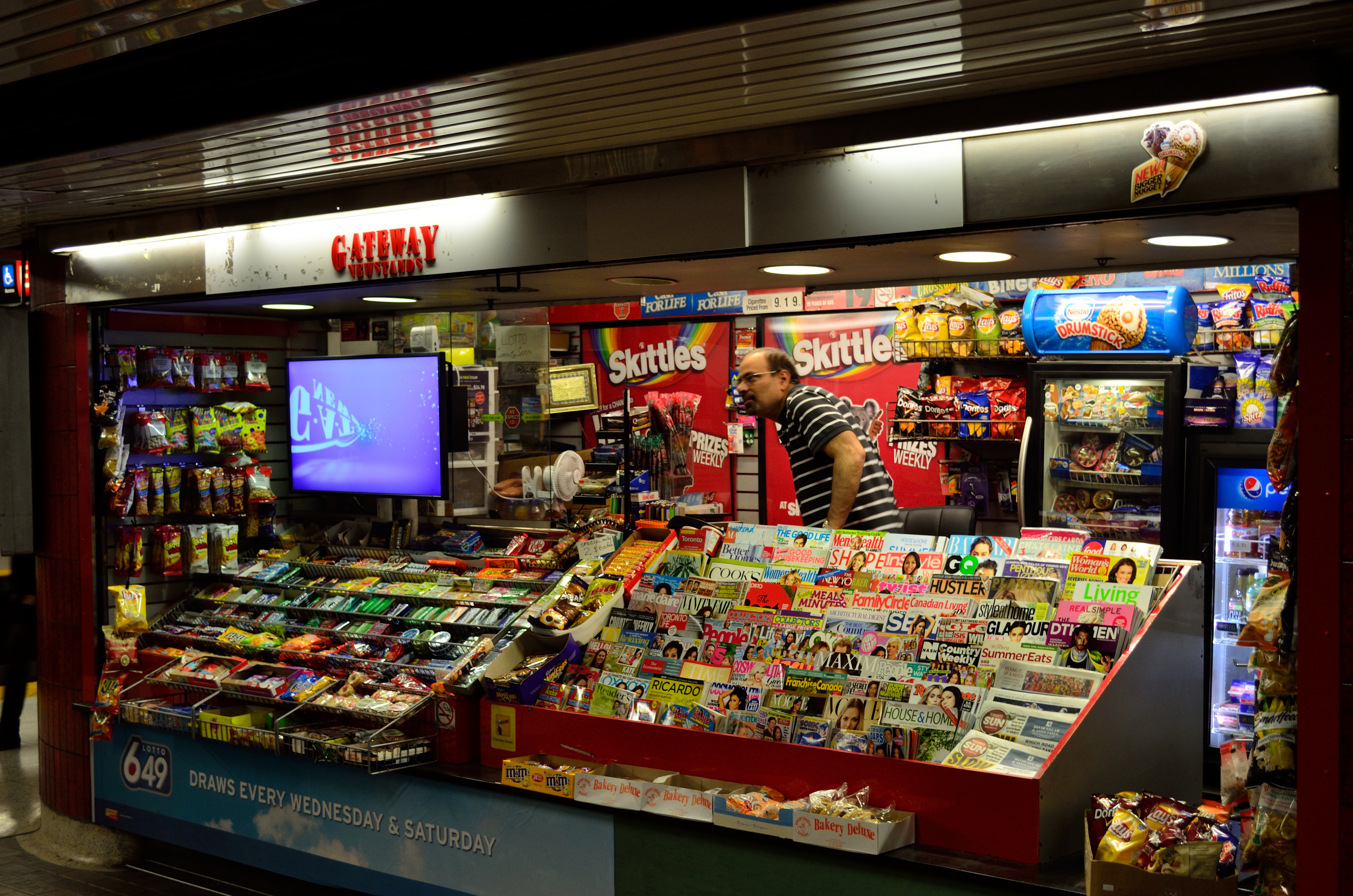
Gateway Newstands at Queen station

By May 2022, Gateway Newstands had filed for creditor protection with Gateway owing creditors $20 million. In 2020 and 2021, about 40 Gateway locations had closed dropping from 191 locations at the beginning of 2020 to 150 in April 2022. The business decline was attributed to a lack of foot traffic due to the COVID-19 pandemic.

Gateway Newstands once operated over 300 locations in US and Canada in major urban centers. It had 65 locations in the Toronto subway system since the mid-1990s. It is the exclusive newsstand retailer in North America’s 3rd largest transit system, the Toronto Transit Commission. Competitors to Gateway Newstands accused the Toronto Transit Commission of sole-sourcing.
