= Anthony Celino =

Filipino-American Catholic bishop (born 1972)

His Excellency, The Most Reverend Anthony Celino
- Auxiliary Bishop of El Paso; Titular Bishop of Maronana
- Diocese: El Paso
- Appointed: February 8, 2023
- Installed: March 31, 2023
- Other post: Titular Bishop of Maronana

Orders
- Ordination: June 6, 1997 by Armando Xavier Ochoa
- Consecration: March 31, 2023 by Mark J. Seitz, Gustavo García-Siller, and John Stowe

Personal details
- Born: Anthony Cerdan Celino; April 29, 1972 (age 54) Anda, Pangasinan Philippines
- Education: University of Saint Mary of the Lake; Catholic University of America
- Motto: Servire tibi sicut mereris (To serve you as you deserve)

Styles of Anthony Cerdan Celino
- Reference style: His Excellency
- Spoken style: Your Excellency
- Religious style: Bishop

Anthony Cerdan Celino (born April 29, 1972) is a Filipino-born priest of the Catholic Church who has been serving as auxiliary bishop for the Diocese of El Paso in Texas since 2023.

== Biography ==
=== Early life ===
Anthony Celino was born on April 29, 1972, in Anda, Pangasinan in the Philippines, the youngest of seven children born to Teodolo Celino and Mines Cerdan Celino. Teodoro Celino died when Anthony Celino was four years old. After beginning to serve mass as a child, he visited a seminary on a school outing. Having enjoyed the experience, he decided to enter the high school at Mary, Help of Christians Seminary in Dagupan City.

Celino graduated from Mary, Help of Christians college seminary in 1993. At the invitation of bishop Raymundo Peña of El Paso, Celino immigrated to the United States. He later moved to Mundelein, Illinois, to begin theological studies at the University of Saint Mary of the Lake. Celino graduated in 1997 with Bachelor of Sacred Theology and Master of Divinity degrees.

=== Priesthood ===
On June 6, 1997, Celino was ordained to the priesthood by Bishop Armando Ochoa at St. Patrick Cathedral in El Paso. The diocese assigned Celino as parochial vicar at St. Patrick Cathedral Parish.

The diocese sent Celino to Washington D.C. in 2001 to study canon law at the Catholic University of America (CUA). He graduated from the CUA School of Canon Law in 2003 with a Licentiate of Canon Law.After returning to Texas in 2004, Celino was appointed administrator (and later pastor) of Santa Lucia Parish in El Paso and judicial vicar for the diocese. He later served as moderator of the curia, vicar general and chancellor. In 2017, Celino was named pastor of St. Raphael parish in El Paso.

=== Auxiliary Bishop of El Paso ===
Pope Francis appointed Celino auxiliary bishop of El Paso on February 8, 2023. On March 31, 2023, Celino was consecrated as a bishop at St. Patrick Cathedral with Bishop Mark J. Seitz acting as principal consecrator. Archbishop Gustavo García-Siller and Bishop John Stowe were the co-consecrators.

== See also ==
- Catholic Church hierarchy
- Catholic Church in the United States
- Historical list of the Catholic bishops of the United States
- List of Catholic bishops of the United States
- Lists of patriarchs, archbishops, and bishops
