= John Stowe =

American prelate of the Catholic Church (born 1966)

His Excellency, The Most Reverend John Eric Stowe O.F.M. Conv.
- Bishop of Lexington
- Church: Roman Catholic
- Archdiocese: Louisville
- Diocese: Lexington
- Appointed: March 12, 2015
- Installed: May 5, 2015
- Predecessor: Ronald William Gainer

Orders
- Ordination: September 16, 1995 by Alexander James Quinn
- Consecration: May 5, 2015 by Joseph Edward Kurtz, Armando Xavier Ochoa, and Gabriel Enrique Montero Umaña

Personal details
- Born: April 15, 1966 (age 60) Amherst, Ohio, US
- Education: Saint Louis University; Jesuit School of Theology
- Motto: Annuntiamus verbum vitae (We announce the word of life)

Styles of John Eric Stowe
- Reference style: His Excellency; The Most Reverend
- Spoken style: Your Excellency
- Religious style: Bishop

John Eric Stowe, O.F.M. Conv., (born April 15, 1966) is an American prelate of the Roman Catholic Church who has been bishop of the Diocese of Lexington in Kentucky since 2015.

== Biography ==
=== Early life ===
John Stowe was born in Amherst, Ohio, on April 15, 1966, to John and Lucy Stowe and grew up in Lorain, Ohio. After graduating from Lorain Catholic High School in 1984, he was admitted as a candidate to the Order of Friars Minor Conventual (Minorites). After Stowe completed his novitiate year, the Minorites sent him to study at Saint Louis University in St. Louis, Missouri; he graduated with a double major in history and philosophy. He professed his solemn vows in the Minorites on August 1, 1992.

Stowe then pursued his seminary studies at the Jesuit School of Theology in Berkeley, California. He received the degrees of Master of Divinity and a Licentiate of Sacred Theology, specializing in church history.

=== Priesthood ===
Stowe was ordained as a priest to the Minorites by Auxiliary Bishop Alexander Quinn on September 16, 1995, at St. Anthony of Padua Church in Lorain, Ohio. After his ordination, the Minorites assigned Stowe to serve in parishes in El Paso, Texas. In 2002, Stowe was invited by Bishop Armando Ochoa, bishop of El Paso to manage the diocesan chancery and to serve as his vicar general. He was later appointed as the chancellor of the diocese. In 2010, Stowe was elected vicar provincial of his Franciscan province. He was then given the additional responsibilities of rector of the Basilica and National Shrine of Our Lady of Consolation in Carey, Ohio.

=== Bishop of Lexington ===
On March 12, 2015, Pope Francis appointed Stowe as bishop of Lexington. He received his episcopal consecration at the Cathedral of Christ the King in Lexington from Archbishop Joseph Kurtz, with Bishops Armando Ochoa and Gabriel Enrique Montero Umaña serving as co-consecrators on May 5, 2015.

In February 2018, Stowe joined the Pax Christi USA Board as their president.

== Viewpoints ==
=== Immigration ===
In January 2019, Stowe wrote an op-ed in the Lexington Herald-Leader that criticized Nick Sandmann and other students from Covington Catholic High School for sporting apparel supporting President Donald Trump during the 2019 March for Life rally in Washington, D.C. Stowe said the slogan "Make America Great Again" on their clothing:

[...] supports a president who denigrates the lives of immigrants, refugees and people from countries that he describes with indecent words and haphazardly endangers with life-threatening policies.

=== LGBTQ rights ===
In March 2021, Stowe expressed support for the federal Equality Act, proposed legislation that was opposed by the U.S. Conference of Catholic Bishops. He wrote that "As a Catholic bishop, I hate to see any form of harmful discrimination protected by law and it is consistent with our teaching to ensure that LGBTQ people have the protection they need."

On May 21, 2024, the Diocese of Lexington released a statement that said Stowe accepted the profession of Brother Christian Matson, who identified as transgender, as a hermit.

== See also ==
- Catholic Church hierarchy
- Catholic Church in the United States
- Historical list of the Catholic bishops of the United States
- List of Catholic bishops of the United States
- Lists of patriarchs, archbishops, and bishops

Catholic Church titles
Preceded by Ronald William Gainer	Bishop of Lexington; 2015–present	Succeeded by incumbent
