= Cathedral Parish of Saint Patrick (El Paso, Texas) =

Saint Patrick Cathedral
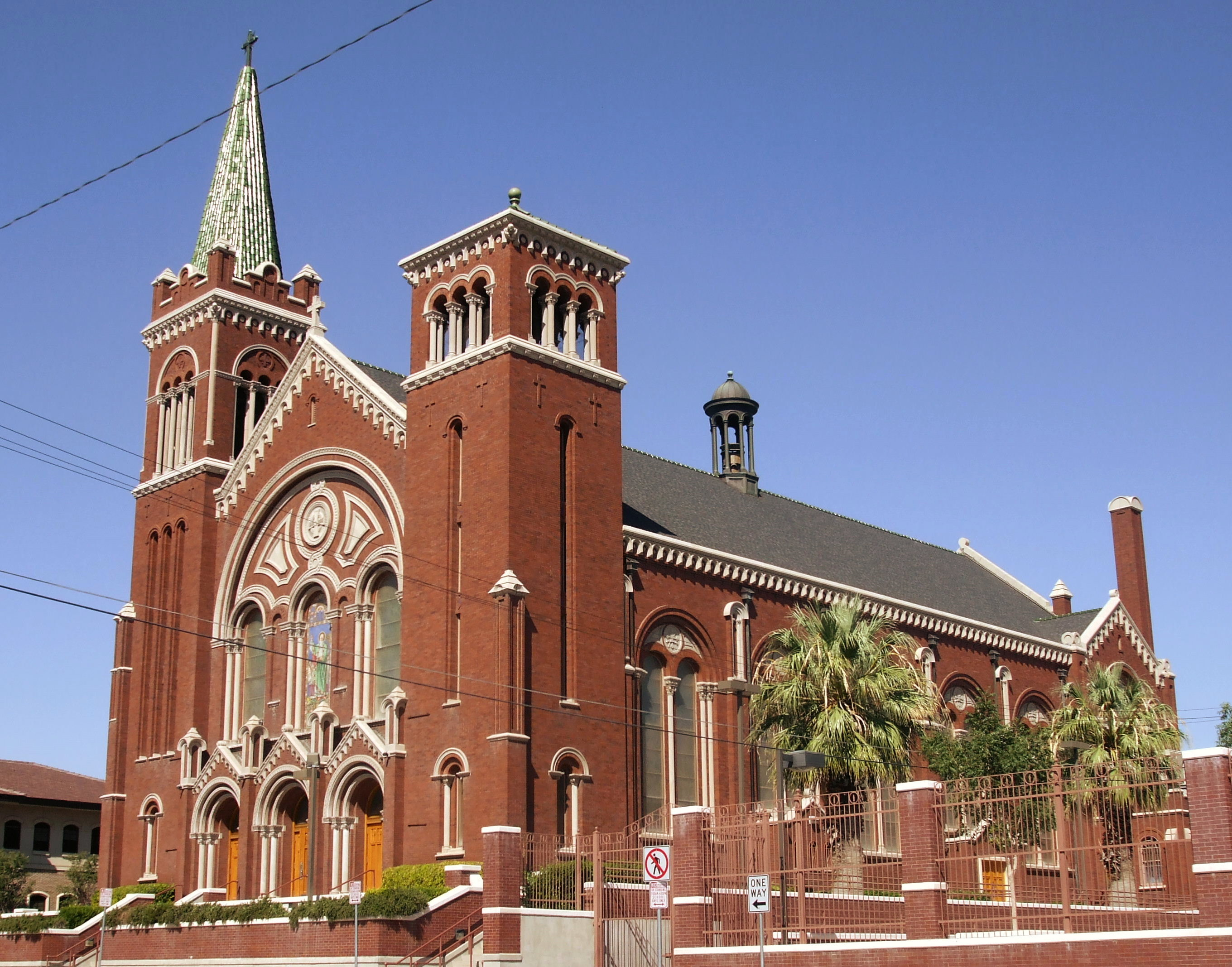

- Location in Texas
- 31°45′57″N 106°29′34″W
- Location: 1118 N. Mesa St. El Paso, Texas
- Country: United States
- Denomination: Roman Catholic
- Website: saintpatrickcathedral.org

History
- Status: Cathedral
- Dedication: St. Patrick
- Dedicated: November 29, 1917

Architecture
- Architect: Barnett, Haynes & Barnett
- Style: Romanesque Revival
- Groundbreaking: 1914
- Completed: 1917

Specifications
- Materials: Brick

Administration
- Diocese: El Paso

Clergy
- Bishop: Most Rev. Mark J. Seitz
- Rector: Rev. Trinidad Fuentez

St. Patrick Cathedral is the seat of the Roman Catholic Diocese of El Paso. The cathedral is located at 1118 N. Mesa Street in El Pase, Texas, in the United States. It is the mother church for the diocese.

The cathedral parish operates Cathedral High School and St. Patrick Elementary School, adjacent to the cathedral.

== History ==
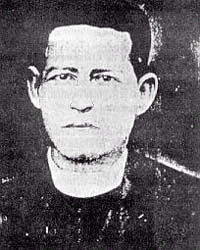
St Peter of Jesus Maldonado (pre-1930)

=== 1900 to 2000 ===
By the early 1910s, the mining industry in El Paso was drawing in waves of Catholic immigrants. At that time, the Catholics in the El Paso Valley were split into three dioceses. Catholic leaders needed to raise $150,000 to build a new church to handle the increased population. They announced that the first group to raise $10,000 would get to name the new cathedral.

The winner of the naming contest in 1913 was a group of Irish-Catholic women who chose the name "St. Patrick". The church was designed by Barnett, Haynes & Barnett, an architectural firm from St Louis, Missouri. It was built in the form of a Byzantine basilica, in the Italian Renaissance style.

In March 1914, Pope Pius X established the Diocese of El Paso. The groundbreaking for St. Patrick's Church was in April 1914 and the cornerstone was laid in July 1914. In June 1915, Pope Benedict XV, after a delay caused by the death of Pius X, name Anthony Joseph Schuler as the first bishop of El Paso. When Schuler arrived in El Paso later that year, he immediately decided to designate St. Patrick Church, still under construction, as the new cathedral.

St. Patrick Cathedral was dedicated on November 29,1917. In 1918, Peter of Jesus Maldonado was ordained a priest at the cathedral. He had been forced to study for the priesthood in El Paso after the Mexican Government closed his seminary. After his ordination, Maldonado returned to Mexico to serve his ministry.

The Sisters of Loretto at the Foot of the Cross in 1923 opened the St. Patrick School. The diocese in 1929 replaced the original glass windows in the cathedral with stained glass windows. In 1936, the cathedral received a large crucifix as a donation from a parishioner.On February 11, 1937, Maldonado died in Chihuahua City in Mexico after receiving a severe beating from government agents.

In 1988, a lightning strike severely damaged the cathedral steeple. Water intrusion also ruined the pipe organ. At this point, the diocese decided to start a major renovation of the cathedral that had been in the planning stages. They replaced the steeple and pipe organ, enlarged the sanctuary and purchased a new altar ambo. The renovations cost $666,000.Pope John Paul II in 1992 beatified Maldonado, as part of the process of canonization.

=== 2000 to present ===
In 2000, Maldonado was proclaimed a saint.In 2002, the cathedral received a donation of a painting of Our Lady of Guadalupe that was created by an artist in Zacatecas, Mexico, over 300 years ago.The Archdiocese of Chihuahua in 2018 donated an urn to St. Patrick's Cathedral that contained some of Maldonado's remains. In 2020, a man smashed a 90-year-old statue of the Sacred Heart of Jesus when the sanctuary was open for prayer. The perpetrator was arrested. The statue was successfully restored in 2021.

In September 2025, the diocese announced a $6 million renovation project to address structural problems at St. Patrick. They also planned to update the HVAC, lighting and sound systems and the electrical wiring in teh cathedral.

== Cathedral interior ==
=== Nave ===
The interior of St. Patrick Cathedral has Roman columns and elaborate frescoes that depict biblical scenes. The Stations of the Cross are carved in bas-relief on the walls. The cathedral seats about 800 people for mass. A painting of Our Lady of Guadalupe and a life-size classical sculpture of St. Patrick are located in alcoves along the walls.

=== Sanctuary ===
The high altar is 27 feet (8.2 m) tall. It contains a 2.5 metres (8.2 ft) statue of the Sacred Heart of Jesus. The baldacchino has columns that are over 8 feet (2.4 m) tall, crafted with several different types of marble. It is topped with a gold eagle.

== Photo gallery I – Stained glass windows ==
The 20 stained-glass windows in the cathedral depicts scenes from the life of Jesus and other events. They were manufactured by the Emil Frei Art Glass Company of St. Louis, Missouri.

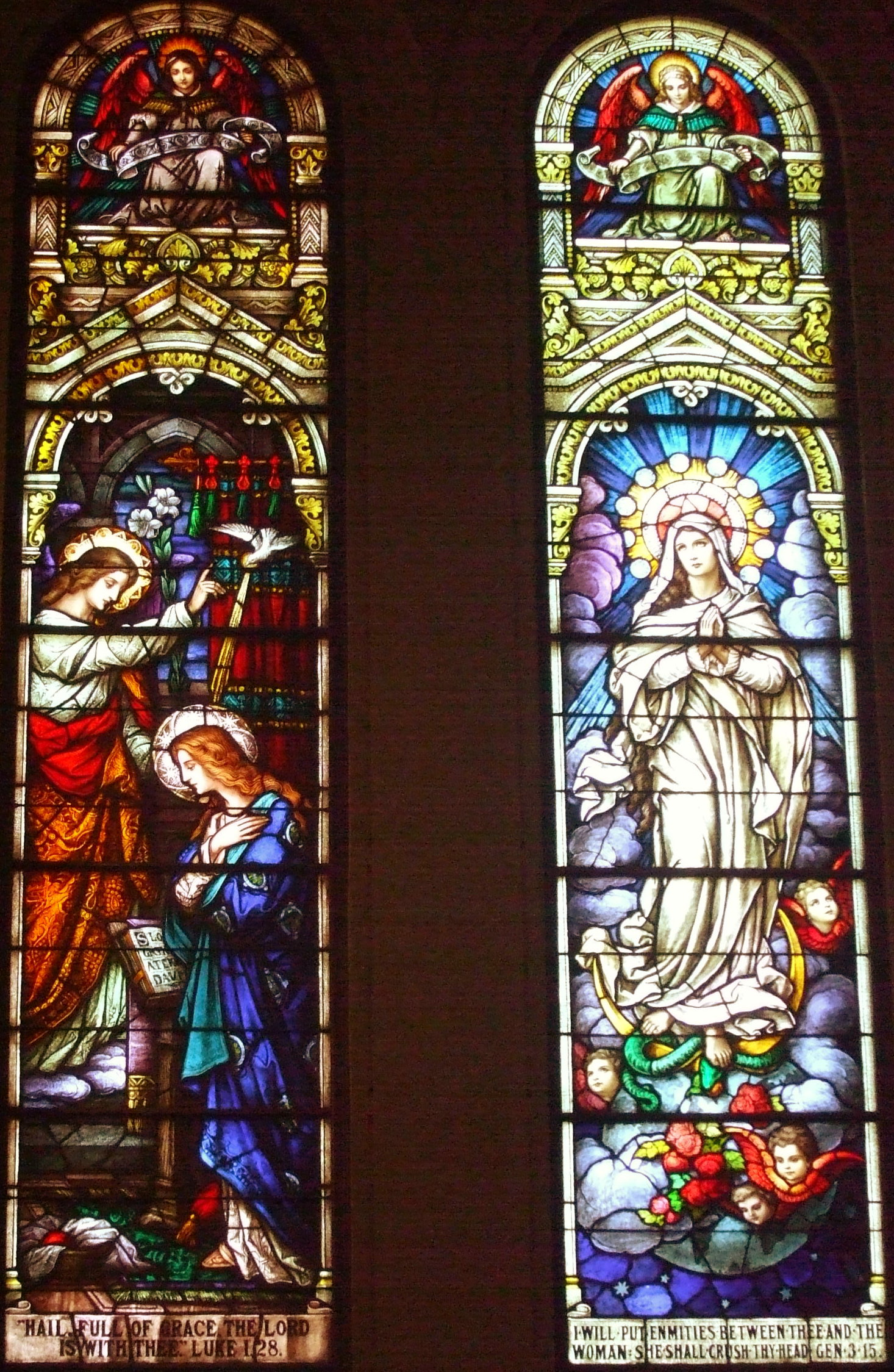
Annunciation and Immaculate Conception (2007)

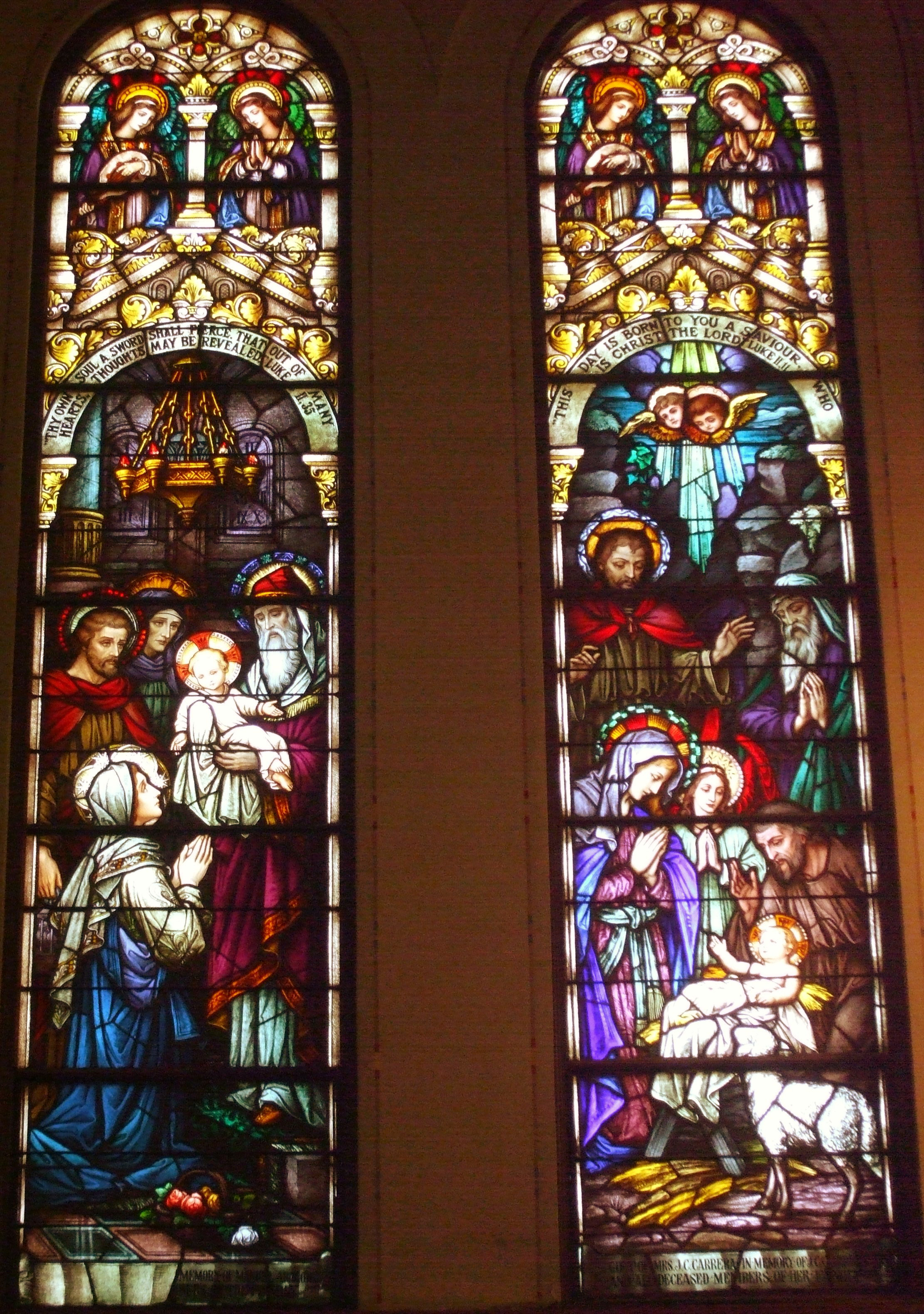
Presentation of Jesus to Simon and Nativity (2007)

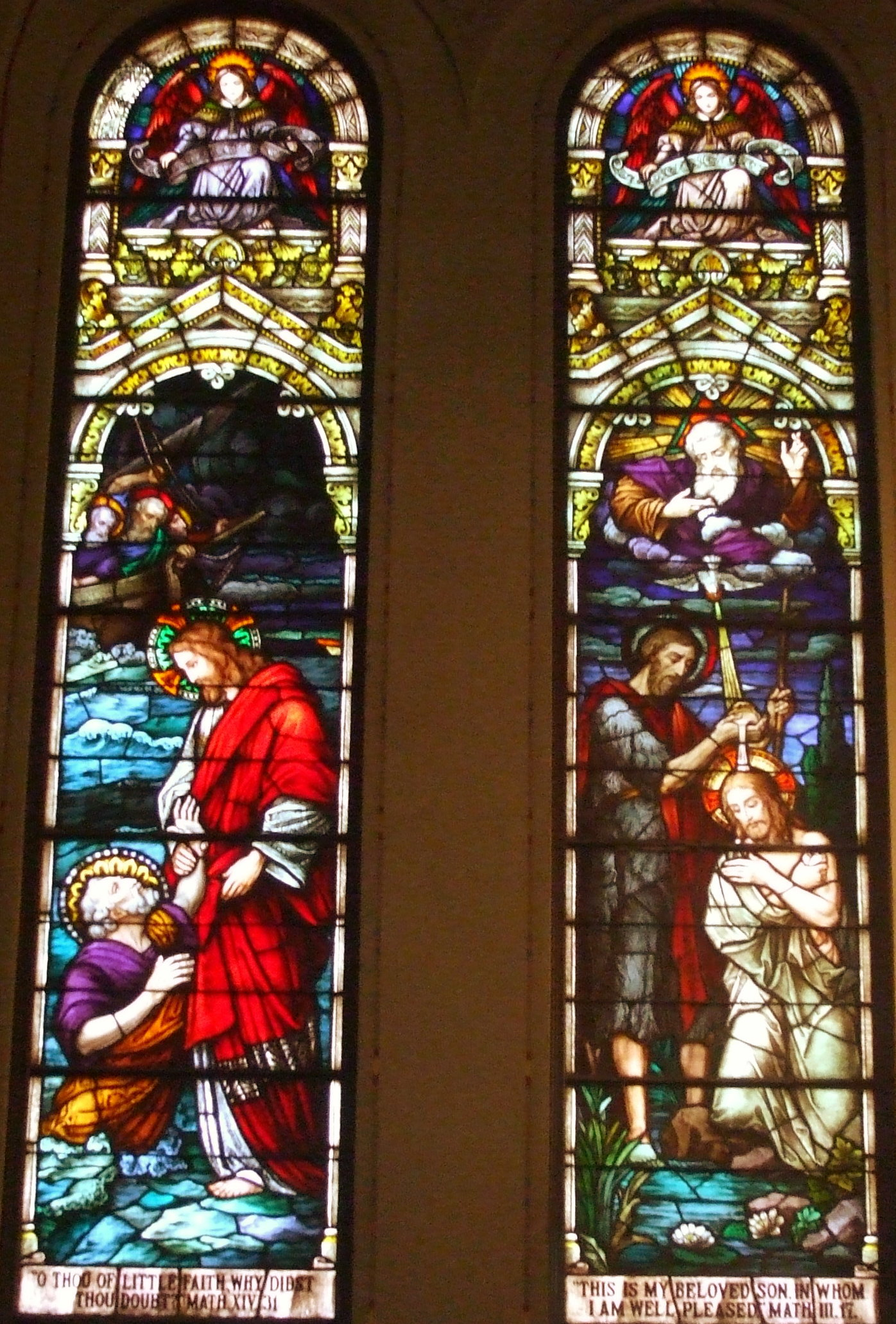
Jesus and Peter on Sea of Galilee and Baptism of Jesus (2007)

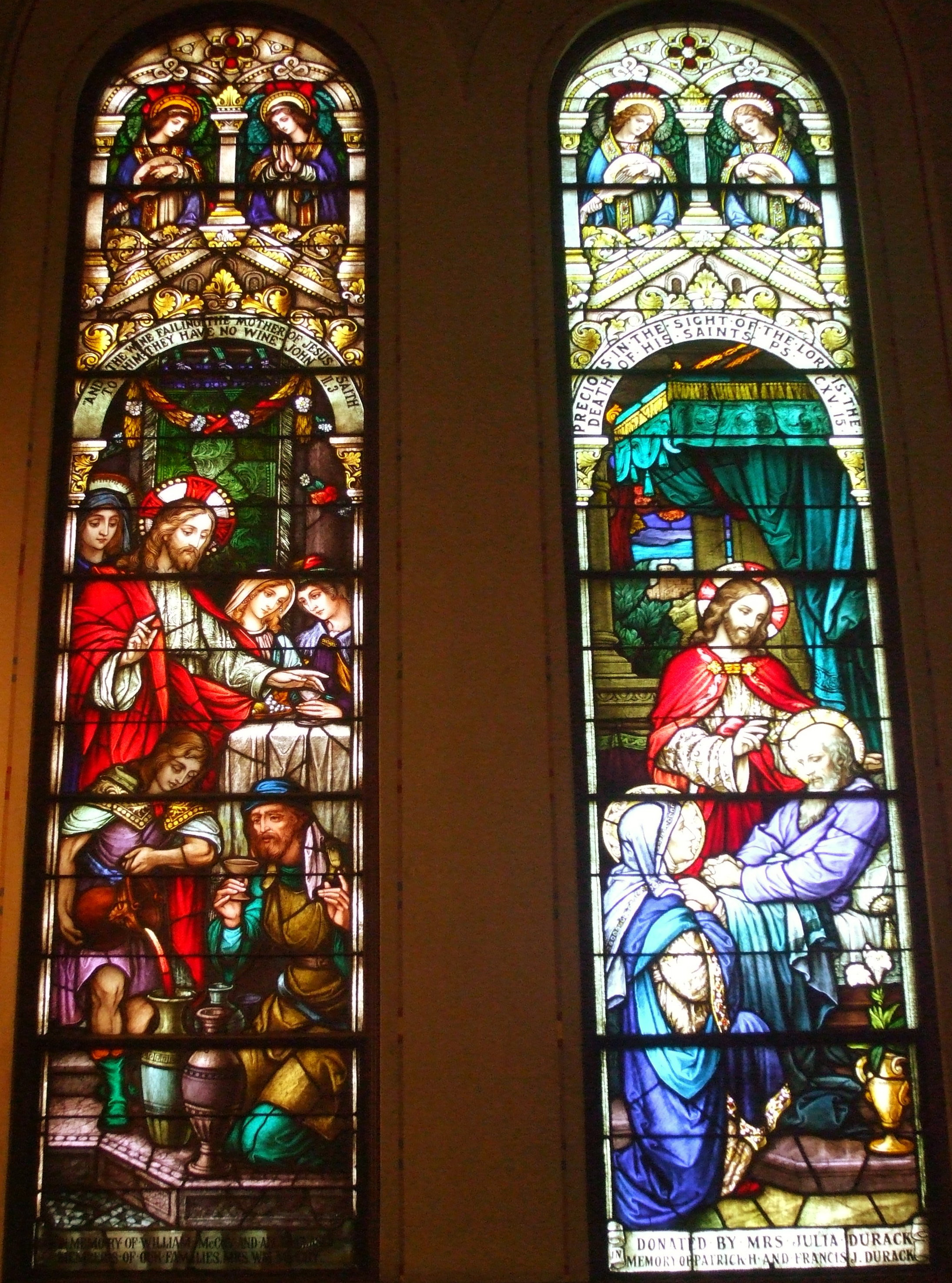
Wedding feast at Cana and Death of Joseph (2007)

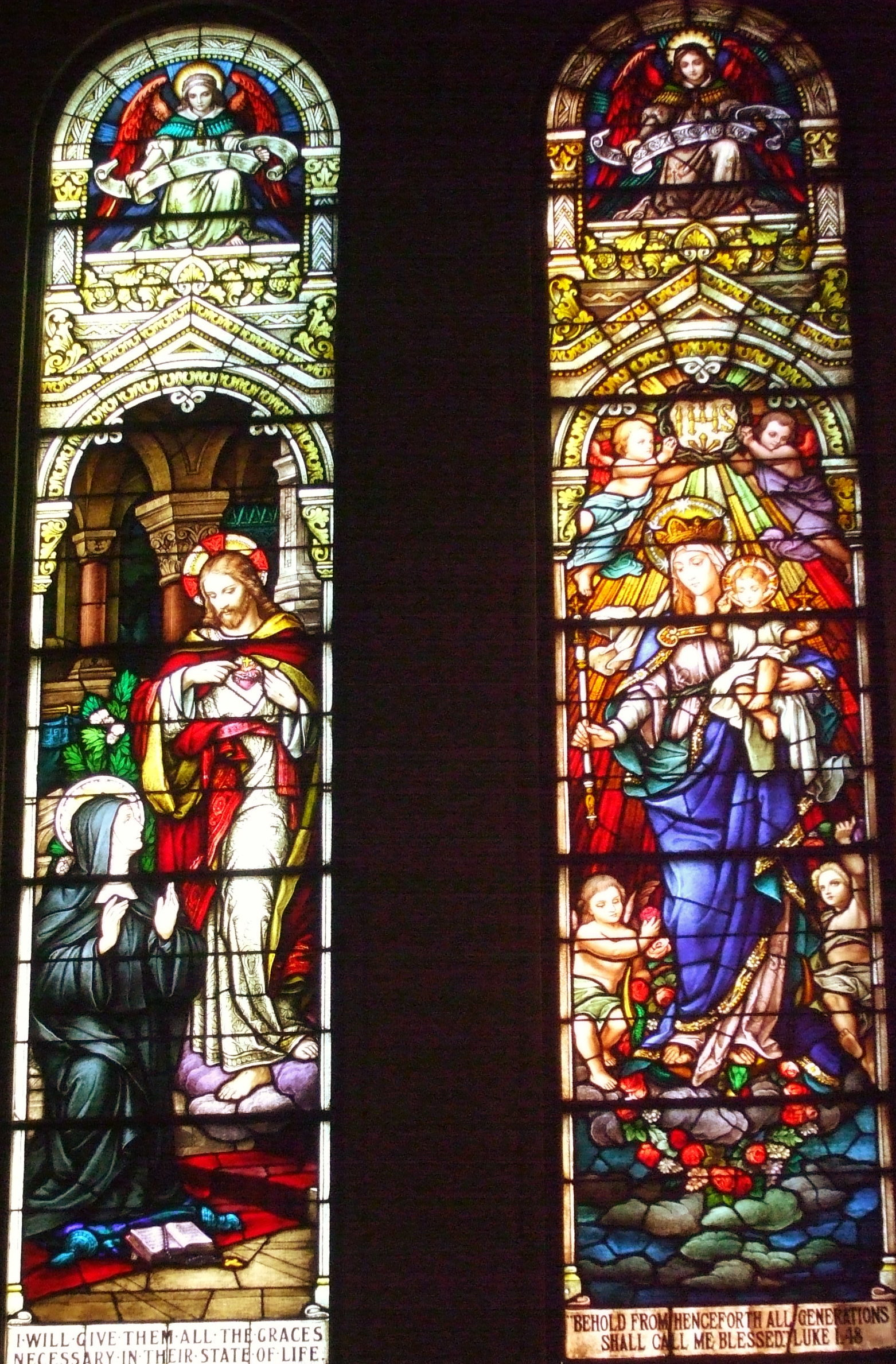
Sacred Heart and Coronation of Our Lady (2007)

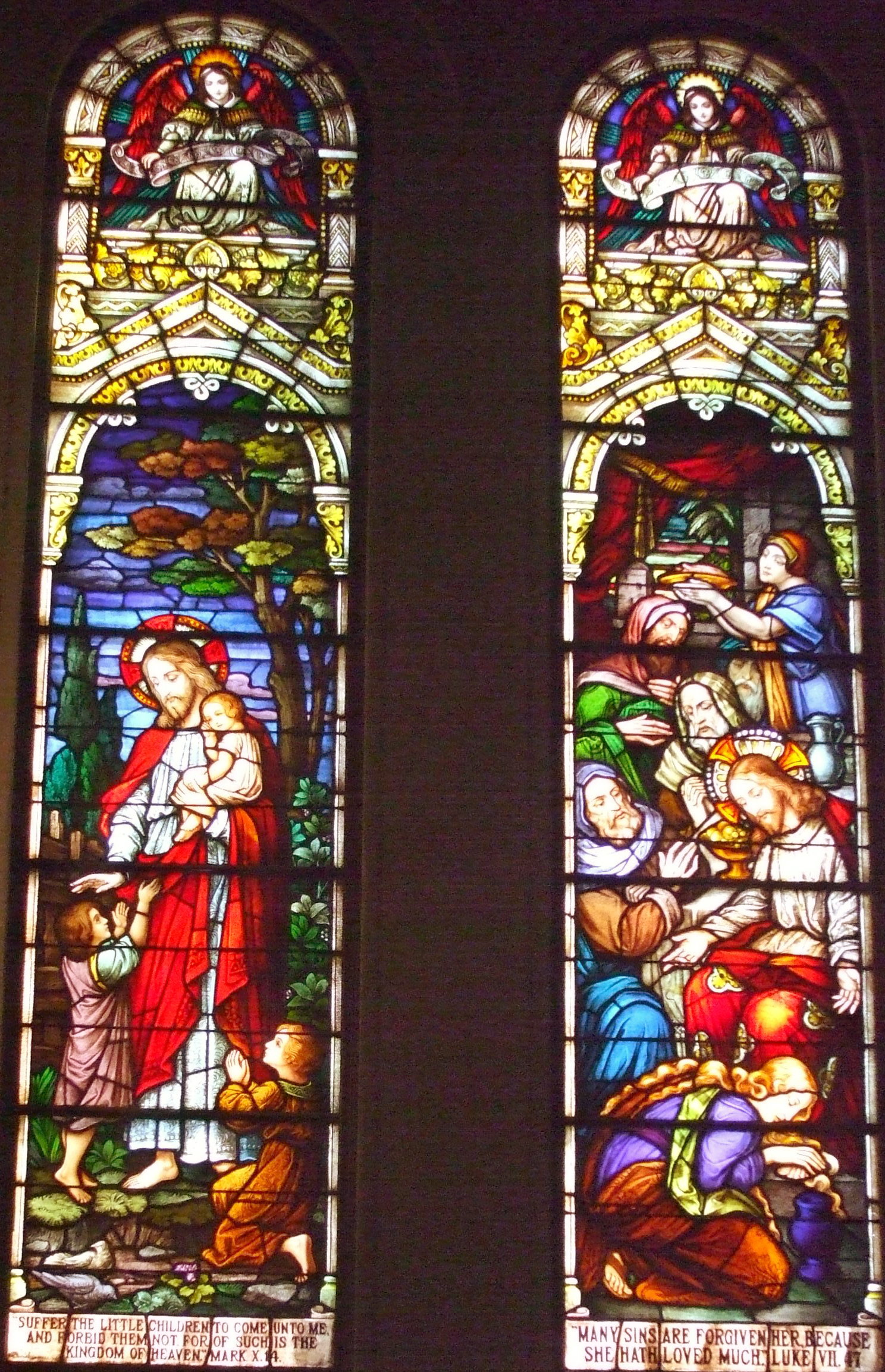
Jesus and the Children and Anointing by Mary (2007)

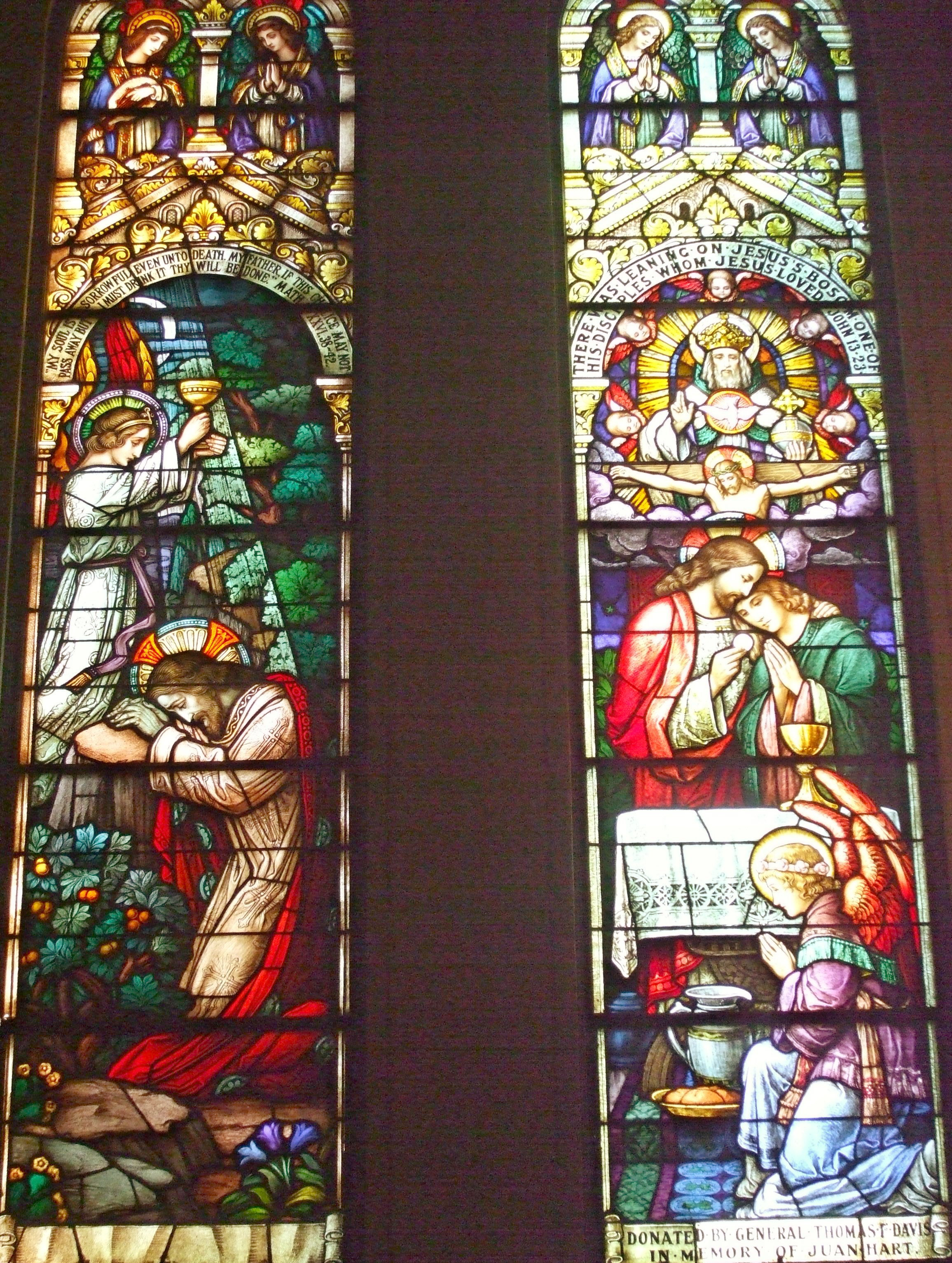
Garden of Gethsemane and Last Supper (2007)

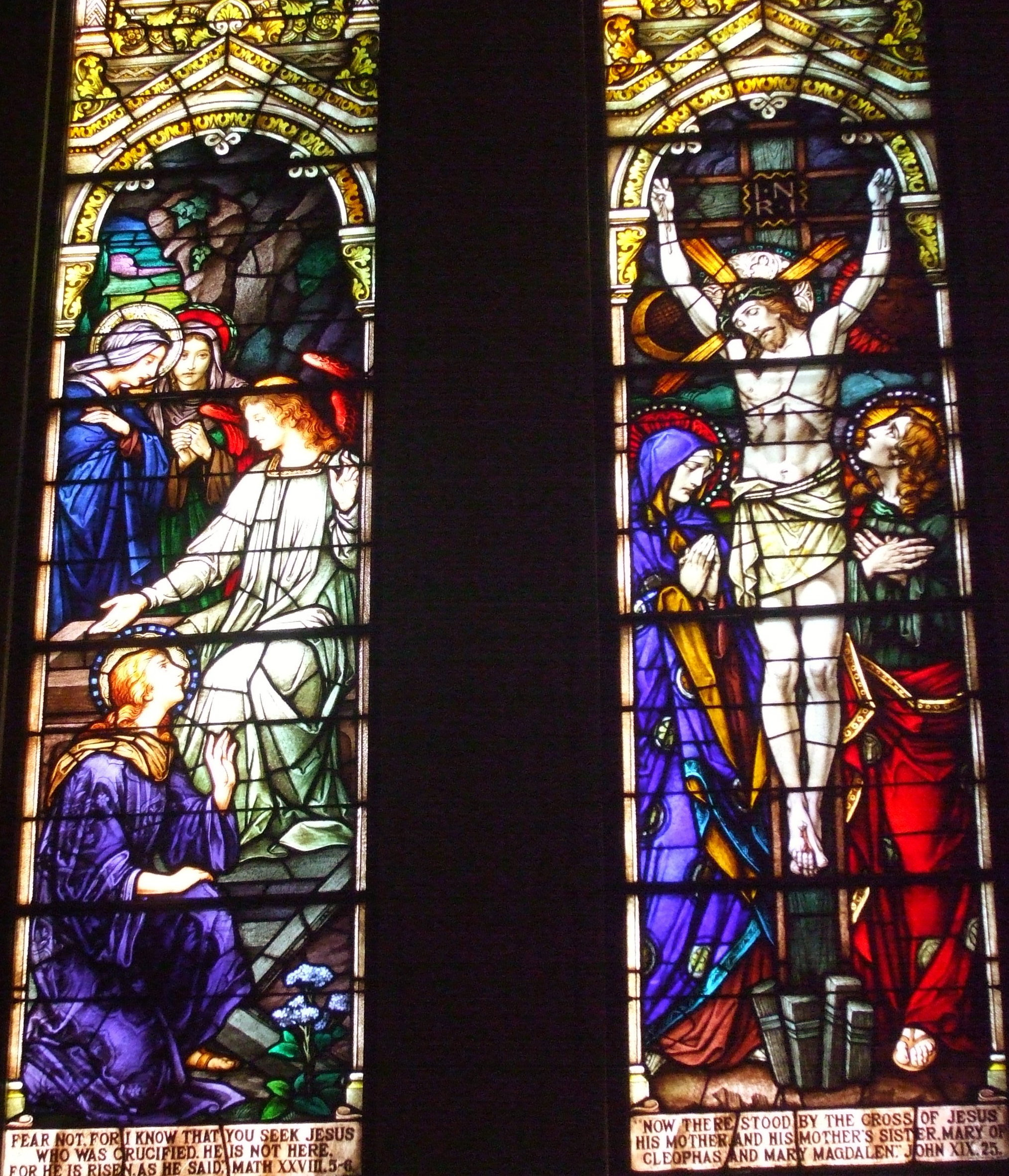
Empty Tomb and Crucifixion (2007)

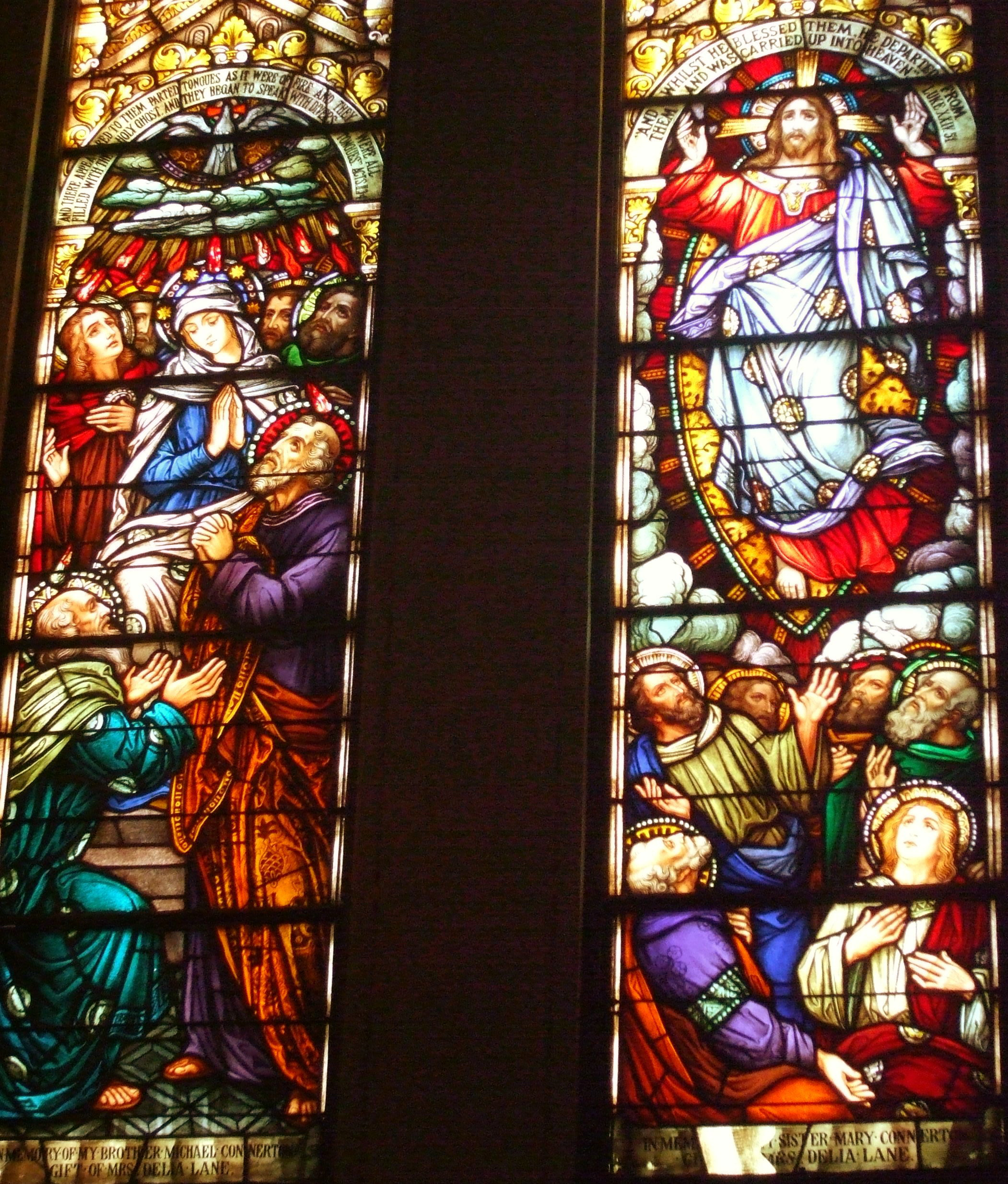
Pentecost and Ascension (2007)

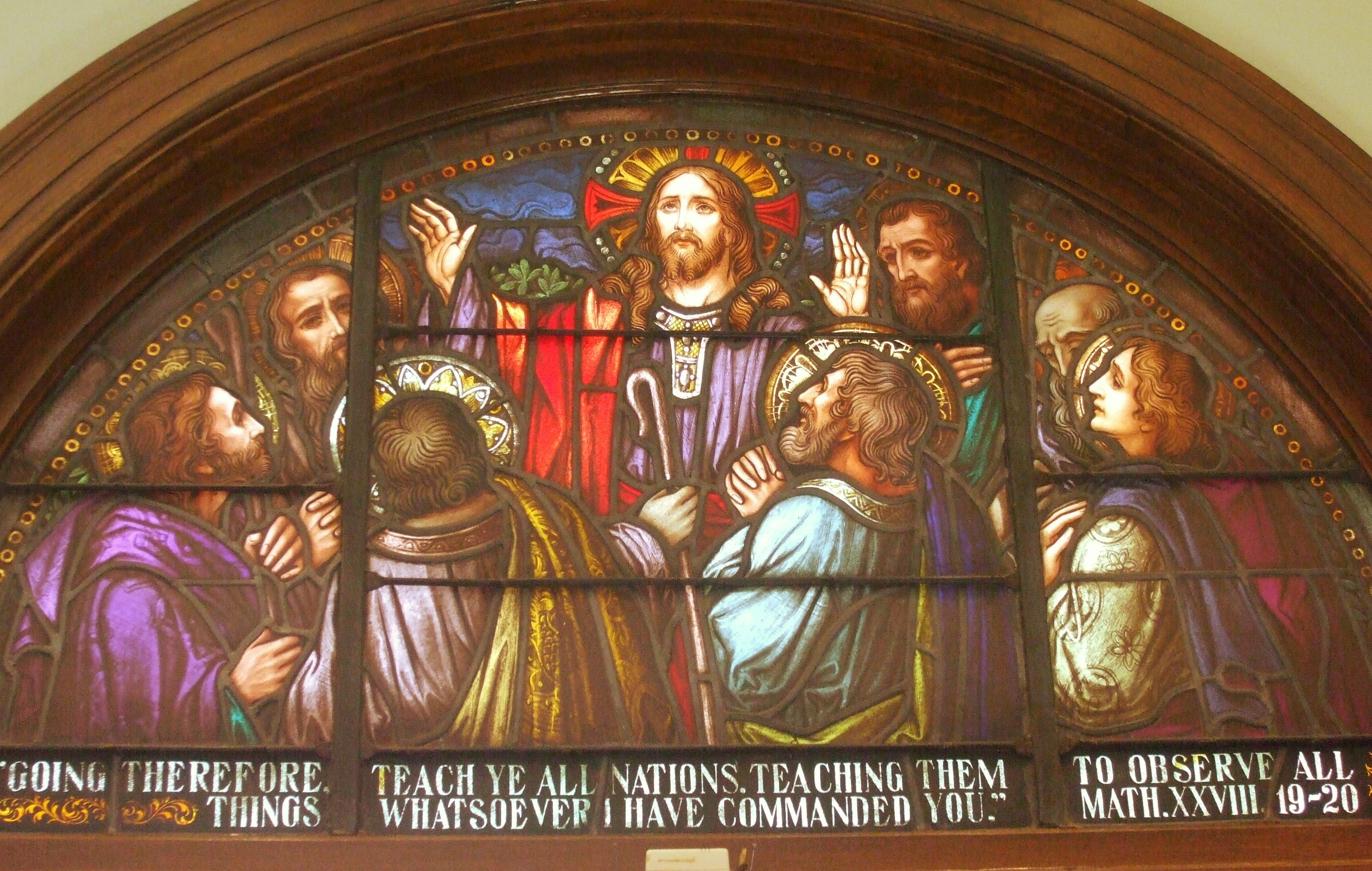
Great Commission (2007)

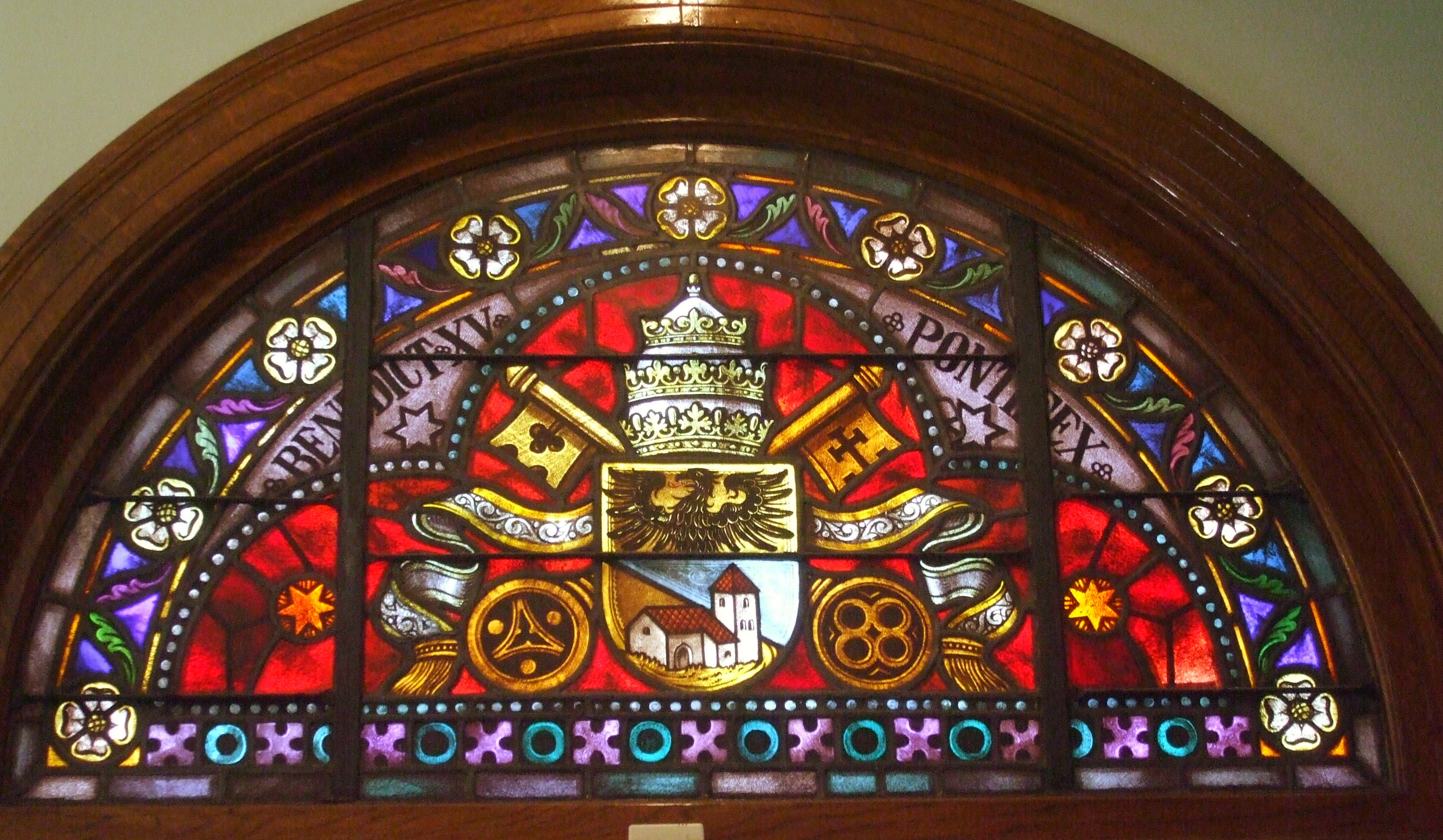
Pontifical Window with coat of arms of Pope Benedict XV (2007)

== Photo gallery II – Other points of interest ==
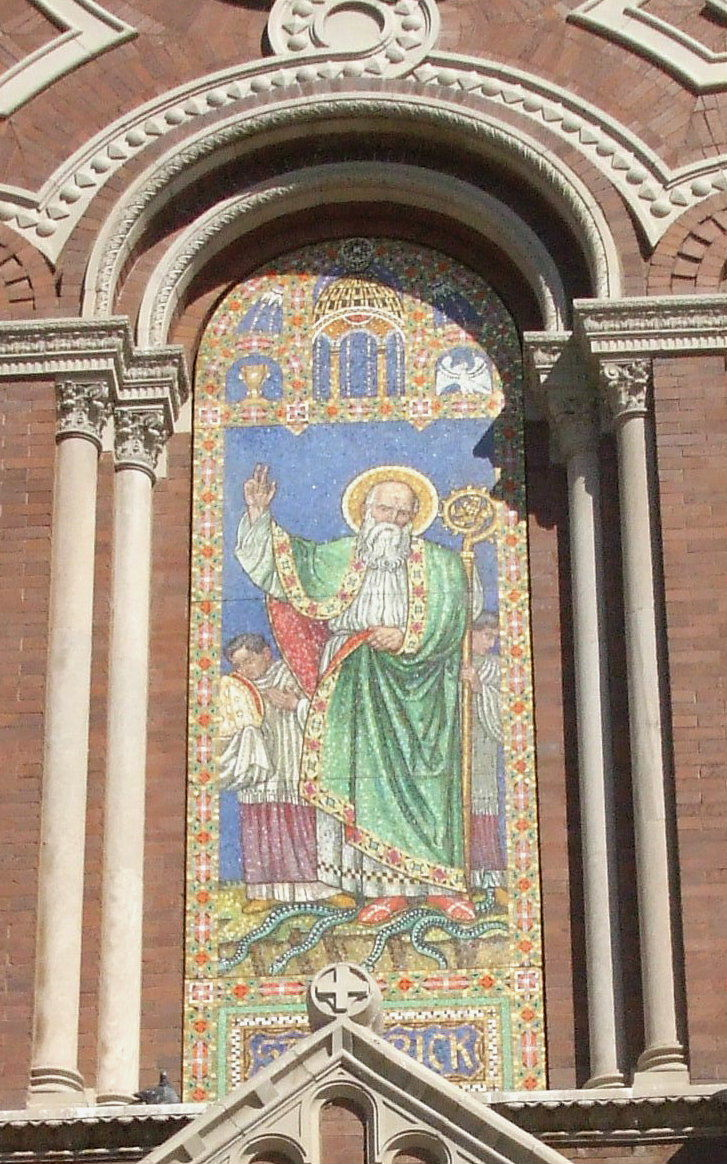
St Patrick Casts Out Snakes from Ireland, exterior (2007)

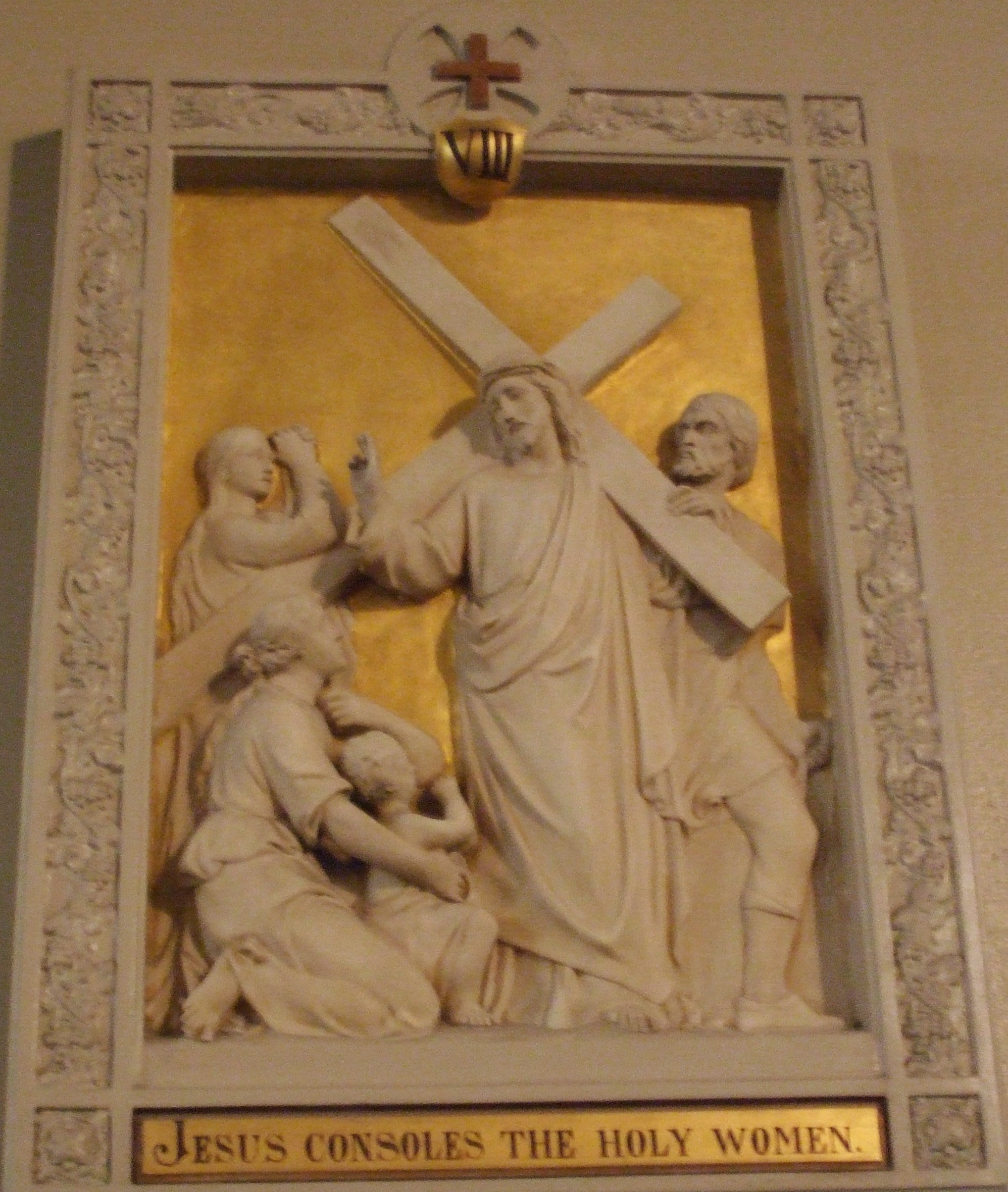
Jesus Consoles the Holy Women, Stations of the Cross, interior (2007)

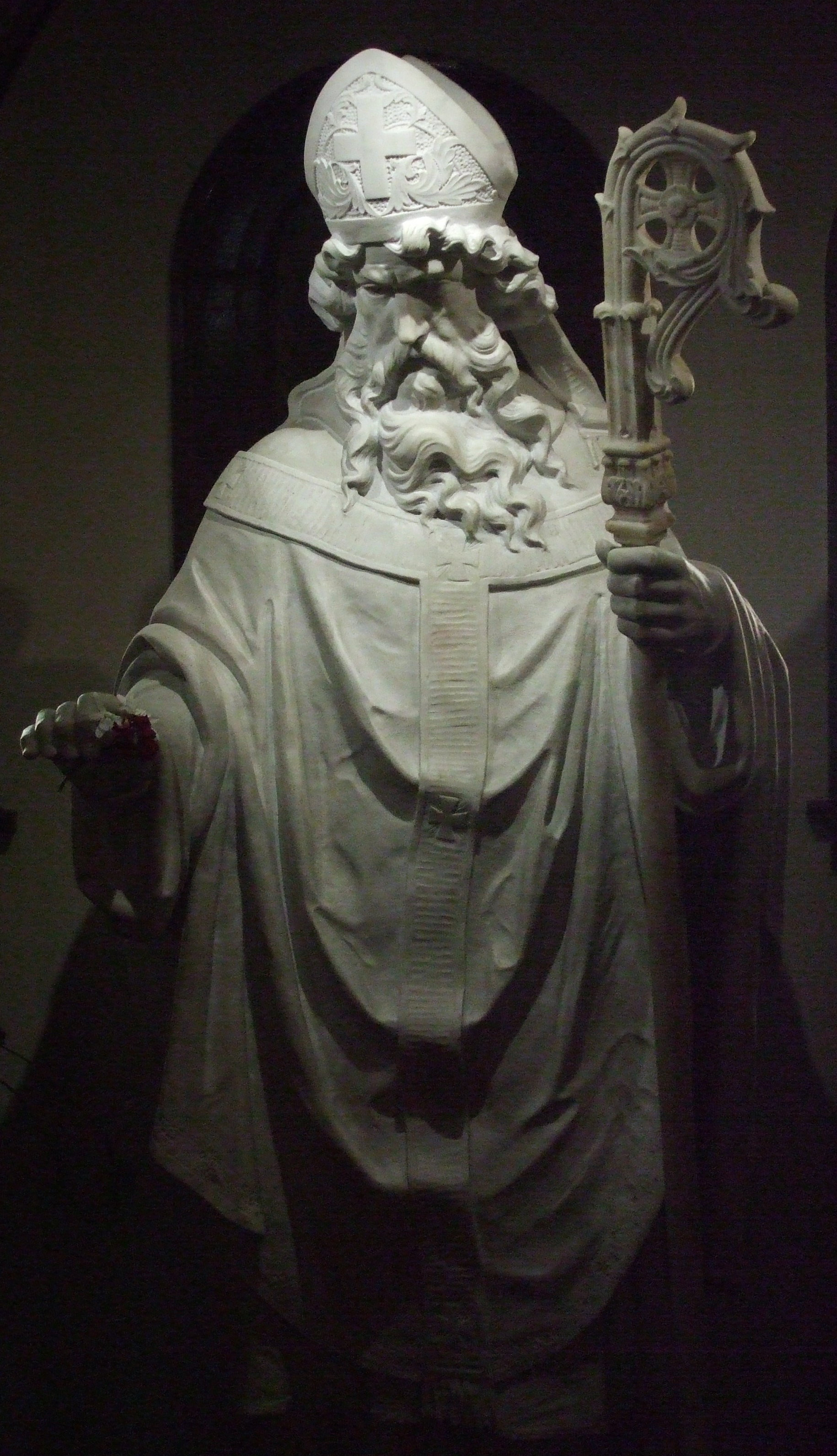
Sculpture of St. Patrick, exterior (2007)

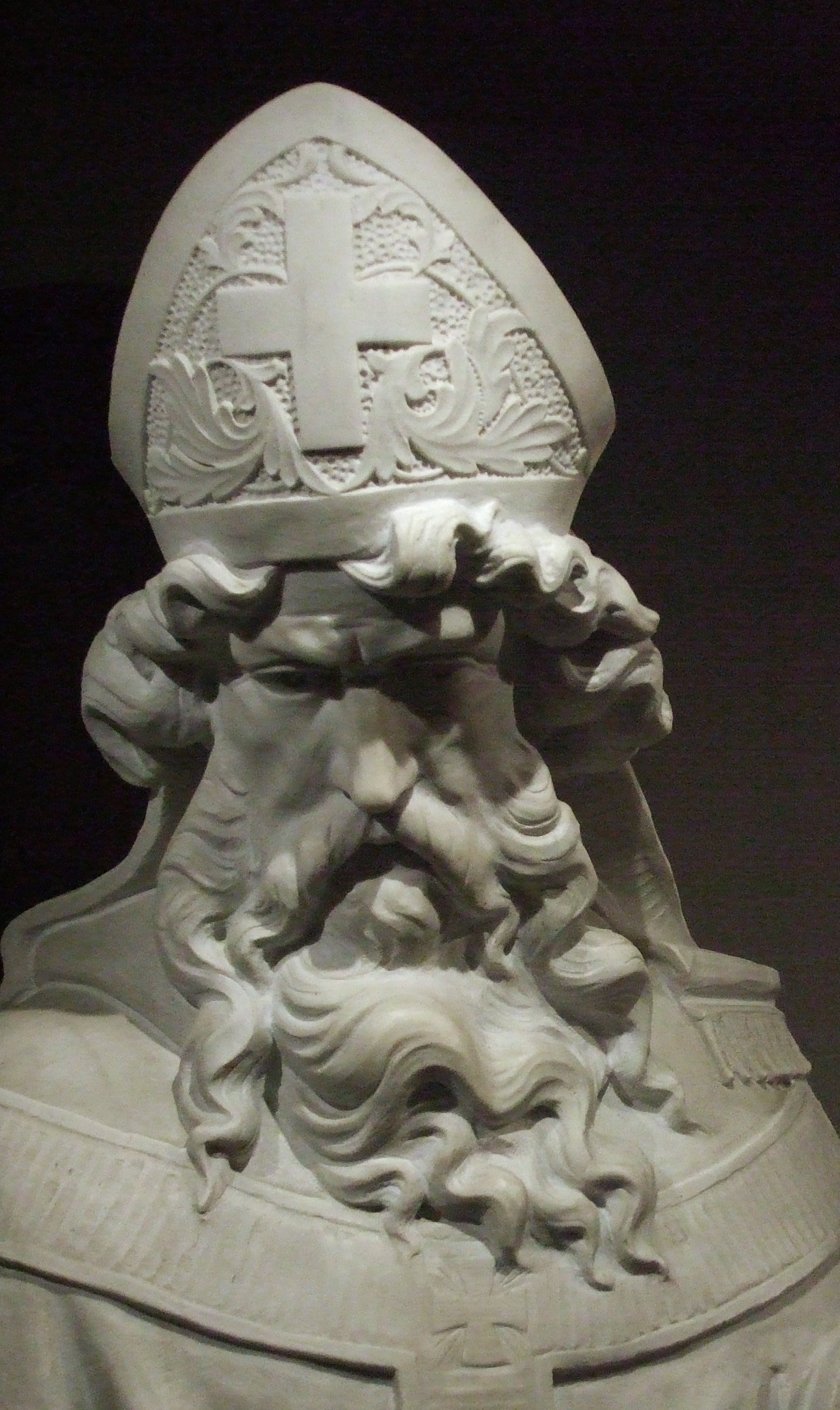
Sculpture of St. Patrick (2007)

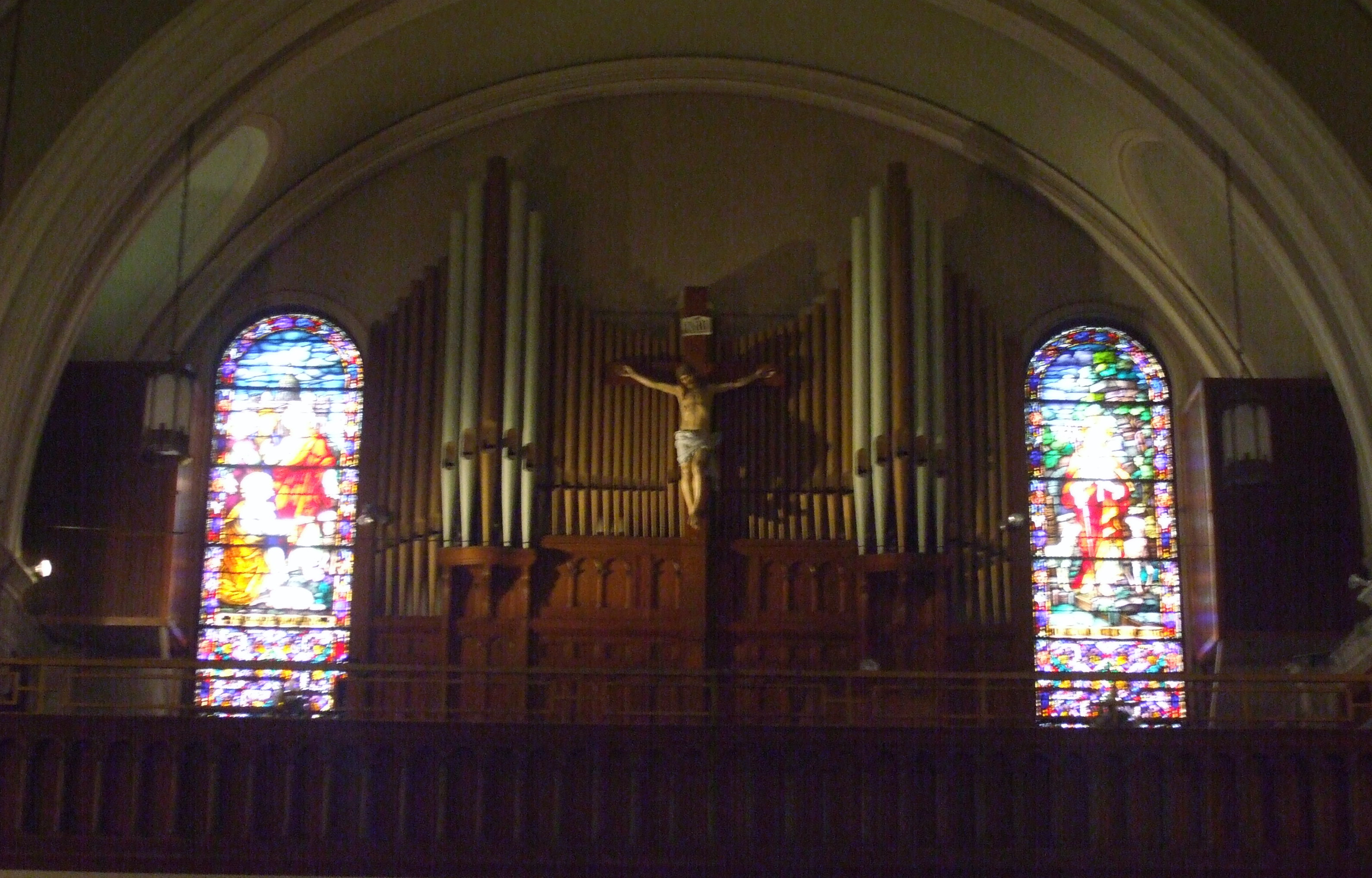
South gallery and pipe organ (2007)

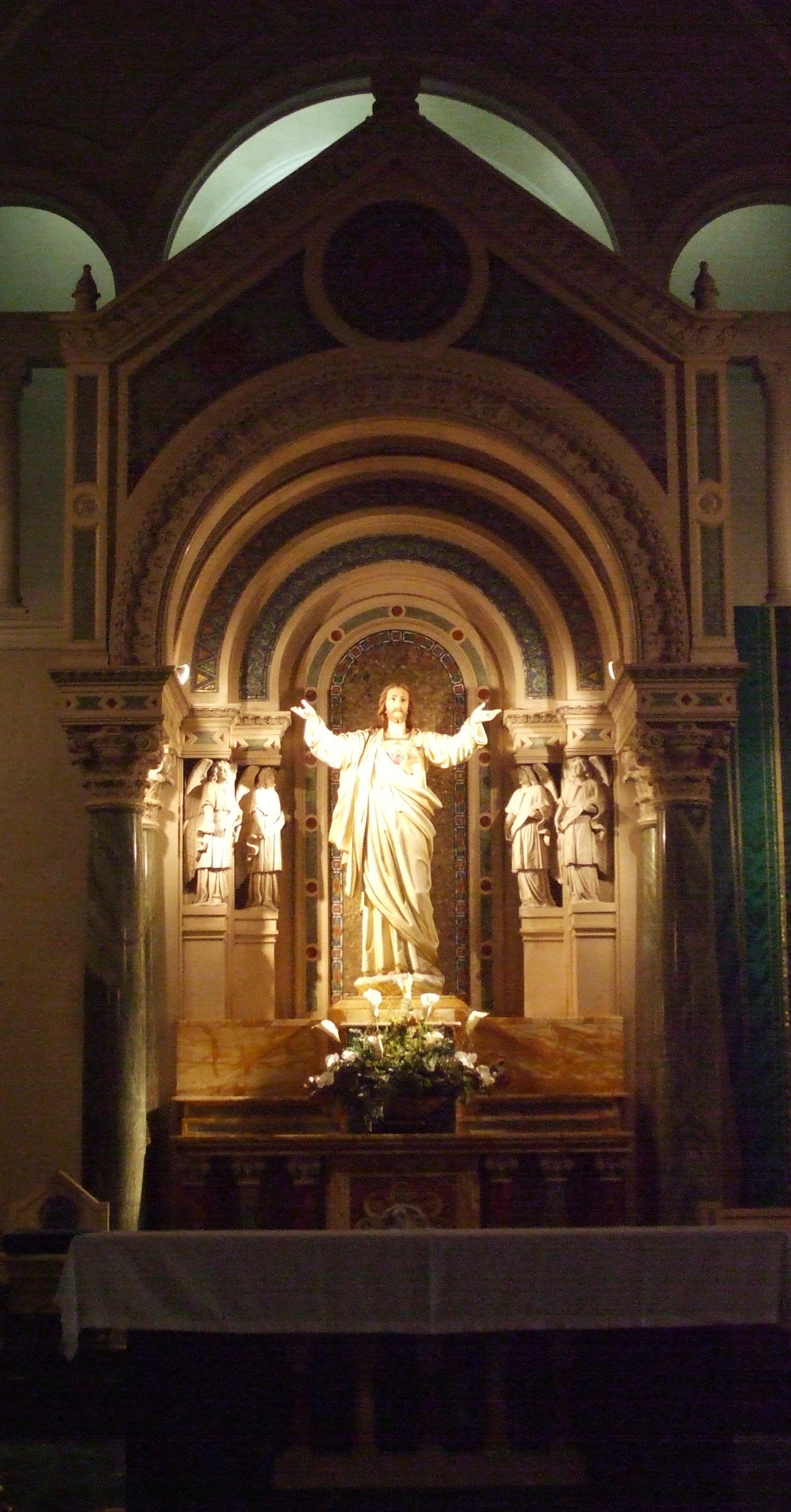
High altar (2007)

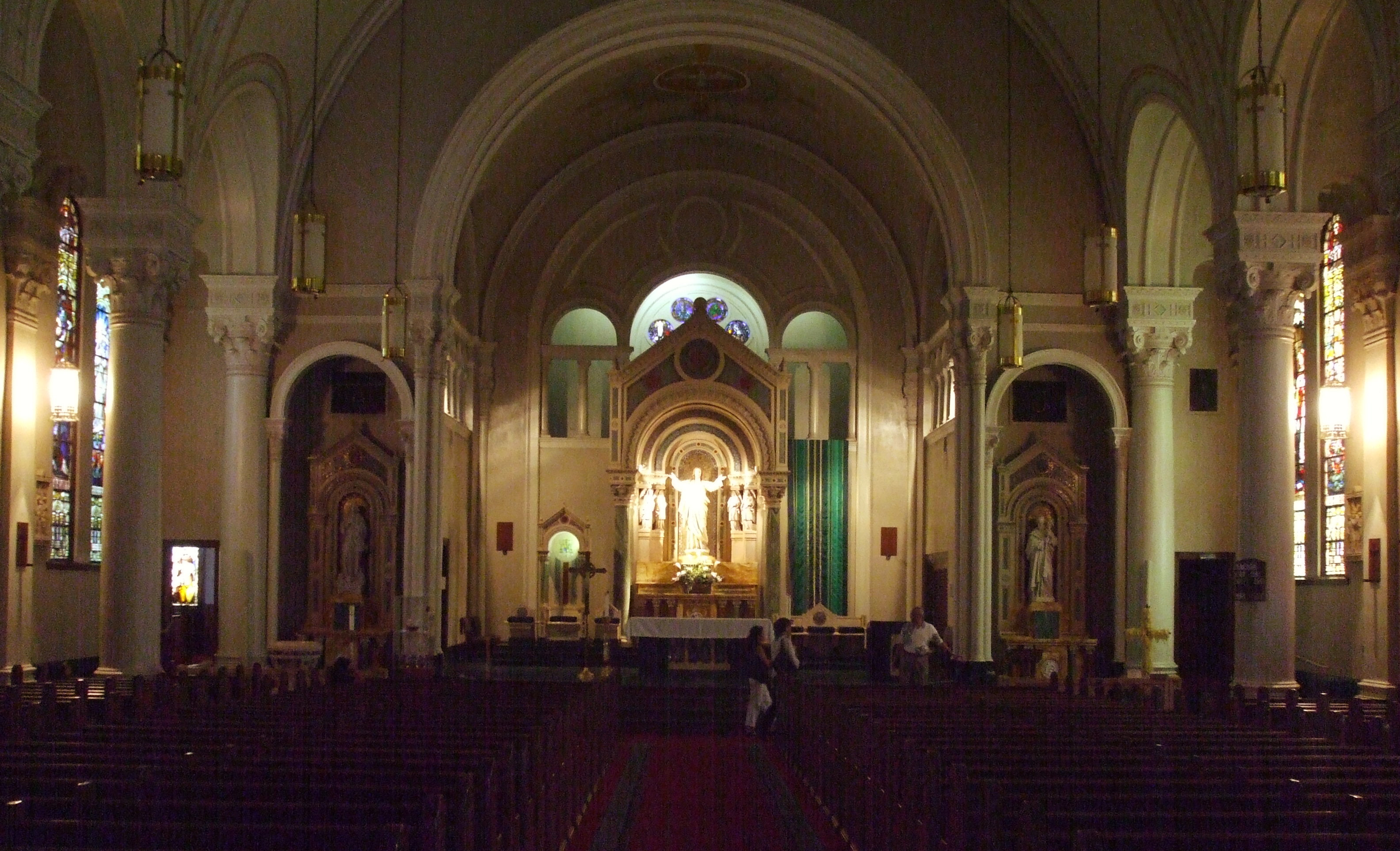
Nave and chancel (2007)

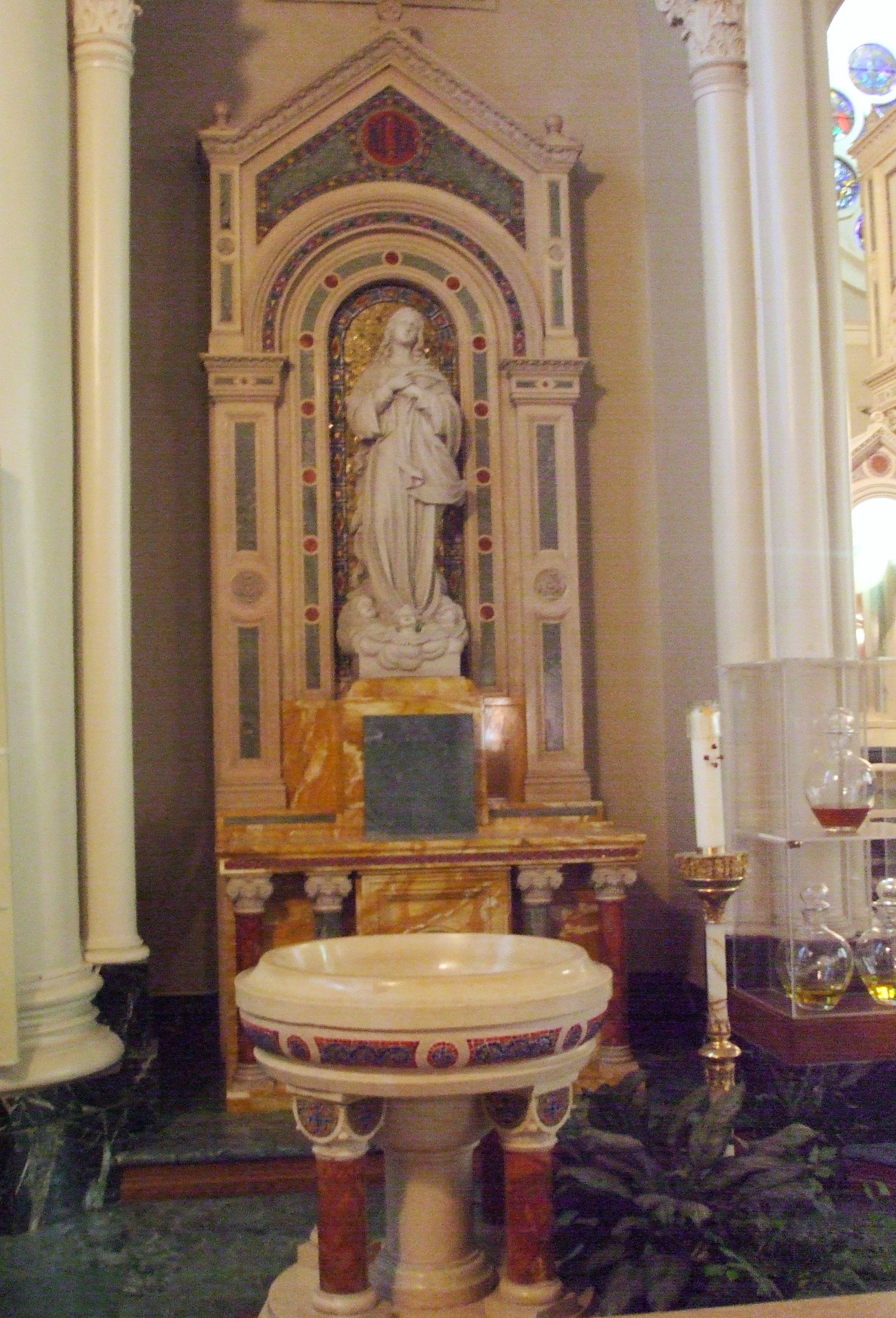
Marian altar and baptistry (2007)

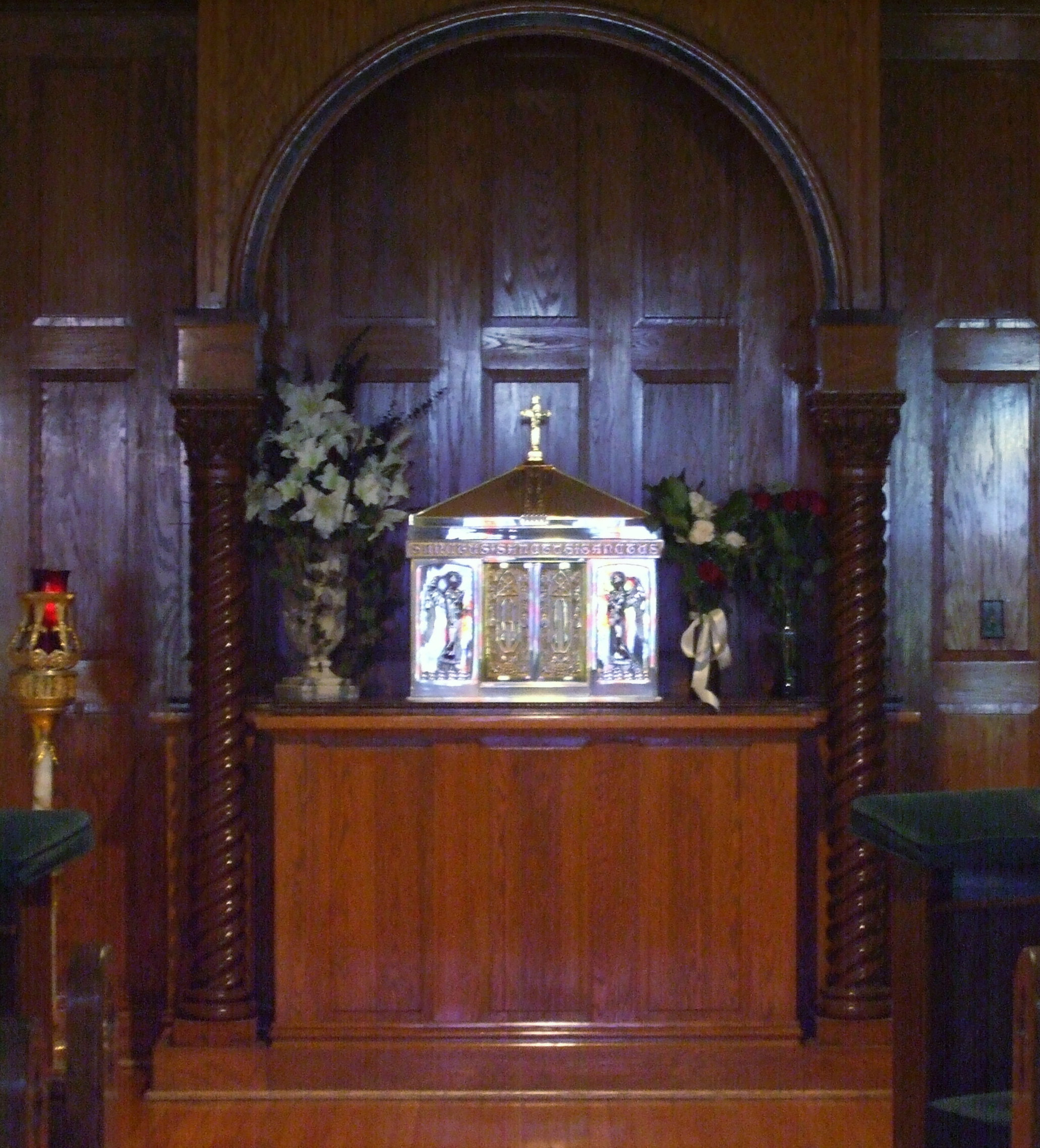
Tabernacle (2007)

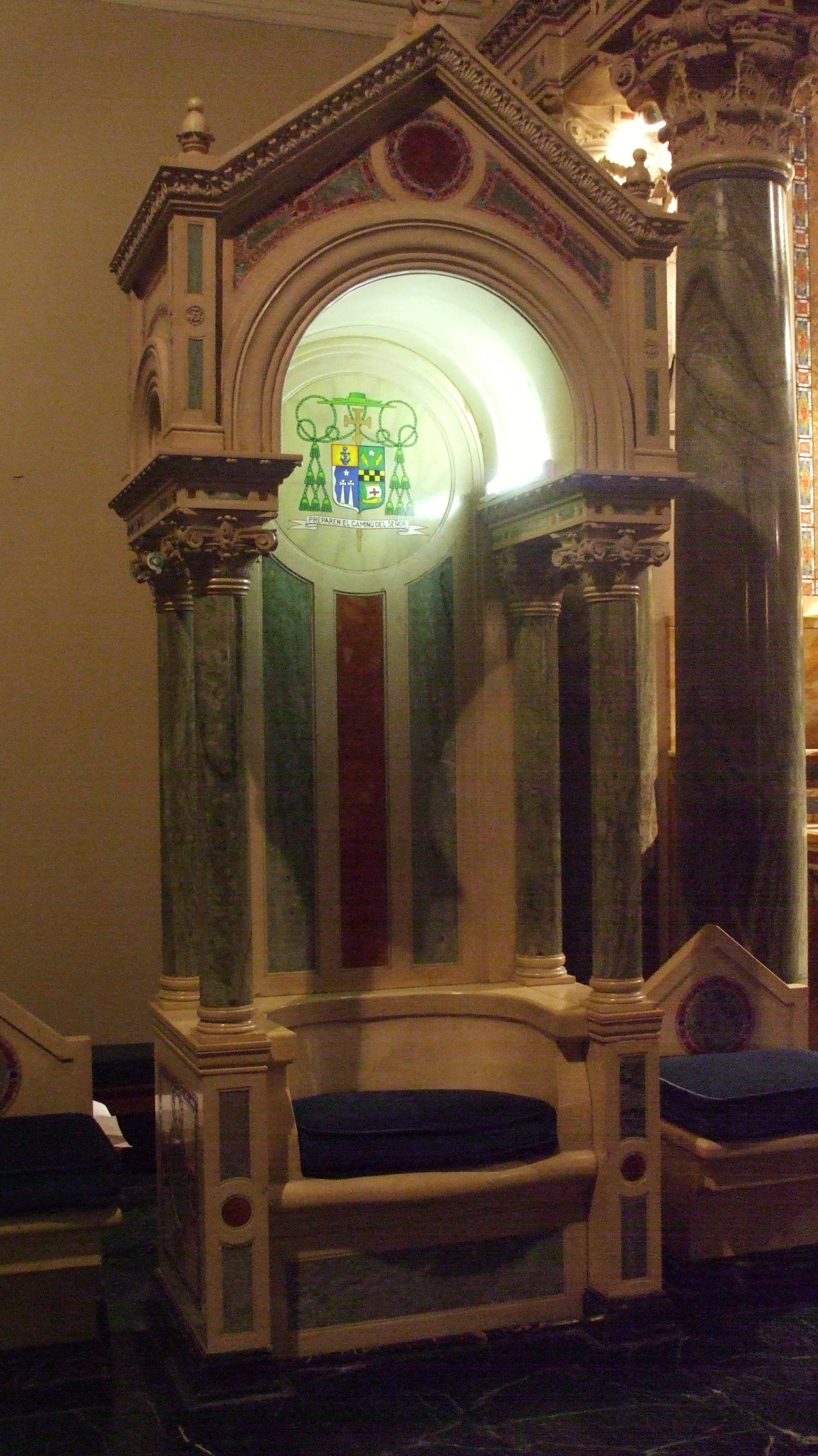
Cathedra (2007)

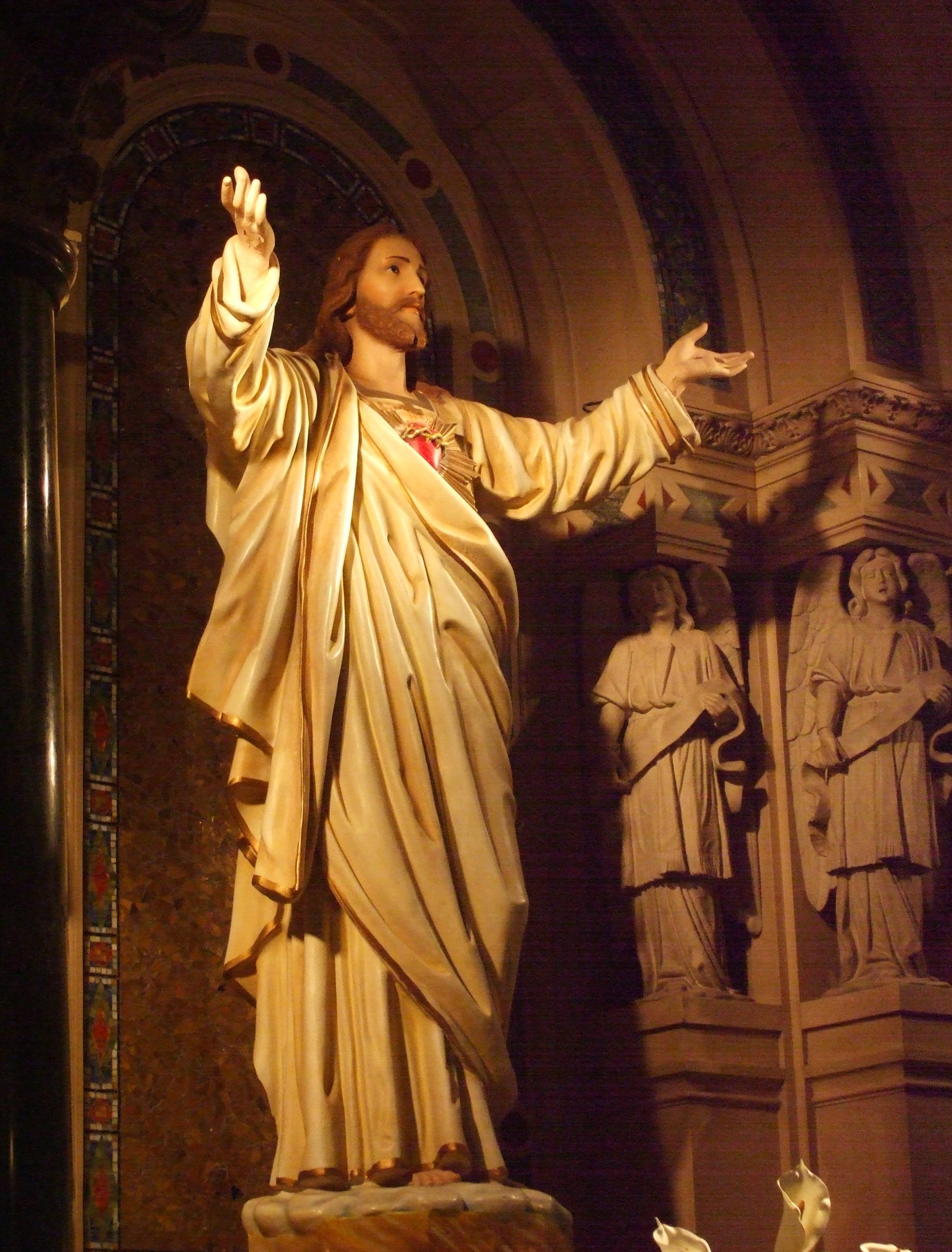
Sacred Heart of Jesus statue before vandalism attack (2007)

== See also ==
- List of Catholic cathedrals in the United States
- List of cathedrals in the United States
