= Peter of Jesus Maldonado =

Mexican Catholic priest, martyr and saint (1892–1937)

Pedro de Jesús Maldonado Lucero
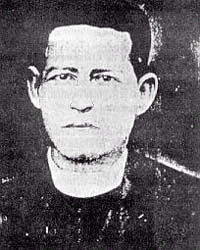
- The young Father Maldonado

Priest and Martyr of the Eucharist
- Born: June 15, 1892; Chihuahua City, Mexico
- Died: February 11, 1937 (aged 44); Chihuahua City, Mexico
- Beatified: November 22, 1992 by John Paul II
- Canonized: May 21, 2000 by John Paul II
- Attributes: priestly vestments, stole, palm, monstrance, Eucharist, Nocturnal Adoration pendant, Knight of Columbus pendant
- Patronage: Clergy of the Archdiocese of Chihuahua, Clergy of the Diocese of El Paso, Knights of Columbus, Mexican Nocturnal Adoration

Pedro de Jesús Maldonado Lucero (June 15, 1892 – February 11, 1937) was a Mexican diocesan priest who became the first canonized saint and martyr from Chihuahua City, Mexico.

== Early life ==
Pedro de Jesús Maldonado was born in a neighborhood of Chihuahua City known as San Nicolás and was one of seven children of Apolinar Maldonado and Micaela Lucero. When he was 17 years old, he entered the diocesan seminary, where he was known for his piety; once, after completing the Spiritual Exercises of Ignatius of Loyola, he told the rector of the seminary "I have thought of always having my heart in heaven and in the Tabernacle."

In 1914 the seminary was shut down due to the revolution and many seminarians fled to El Paso, Texas, but Maldonado remained in Chihuahua and studied music. Later, he continued his religious studies in El Paso. He was ordained a priest on January 25, 1918 in the Cathedral of St. Patrick for the Archdiocese of Chihuahua, Mexico by Bishop Anthony Joseph Schuler, S.J, Bishop of El Paso.

== Priesthood ==
Although Maldonado celebrated his first Masses in El Paso, his first Solemn Mass was in the Church of the Holy Family in Chihuahua on February 11, 1918. Maldonado was assigned to San Nicolás de Carretas where he worked with the Tarahumara Natives. He helped the poor with money and clothing, and raised and educated a poor orphan. Maldonado took a special interest in religious education, explaining Catholic doctrine through the use of photographs. Farmers would ask him to bless the fields.

In January 1924, Maldonado became parish priest of Santa Isabel, where he had charge of the Sunday School. During the Cristero War (1926–29), Maldonado and other priests in Chihuahua were the targets of anti-Catholic violence, which continued for many years after. Revolutionaries changed the name of the town from Santa Isabel to "General Trias" as part of an effort to erase references to Catholicism from the state. At one point Maldonado had to flee to El Paso but was eventually returned to Boquilla del Río, not far from Santa Isabel. He continued to carry out his ministry in Santa Isabel until his death.

== Death ==
On February 10, 1937 (Ash Wednesday), a group of drunken armed men discovered his location at a nearby ranch. Maldonado was brought barefoot to the town hall, where he was pistol-whipped, fracturing his skull and dislodging his left eye from its socket.

Seeing the seriousness of Maldonado's injuries, some local women asked that he be allowed to be taken to a hospital in Chihuahua City, where he died on February 11, 1937 (the 19th anniversary of his first Solemn Mass), from severe brain trauma and injuries throughout his body caused by the beating. According to his death certificate, Maldonado died at 5:15 pm, at the age of 44.

== Veneration ==
To many parishioners in Chihuahua, as well as to his fellow priests and his diocesan bishop, Antonio Guízar y Valencia, he was a martyr because he had been killed because of his faithfulness in carrying out his ministry and because of hatred toward his faith. After his death, Maldonado's tomb became a place of prayer, surrounded by candles, flowers, and votive offerings.

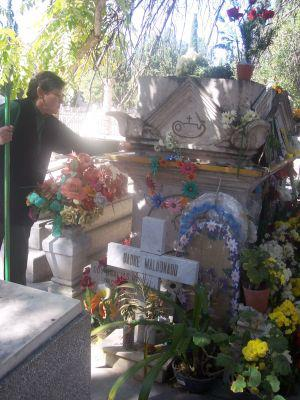
Tomb of Father Maldonado in the Cemetery of Dolores in Chihuahua

In 1975, Adalberto Almeida y Merino, the Archbishop of Chihuahua, officially named Msgr. Martin L. Quiñones the promoter of the cause of canonization for Maldonado. For several years, Quiñones worked with the Episcopal Commission for the Introduction of the Beatification Processes of the Mexican Martyrs. On November 22, 1992, Fr. Maldonado was beatified by Pope John Paul II with Cristóbal Magallanes Jara and companions. He was canonized by Pope John Paul II on May 25, 2000.

=== Relics ===
The relics of Pedro de Jesús Maldonado are found in a wooden urn in the Chapel of the Lord of Mapimí in the Cathedral of Chihuahua. There is a traveling urn that contains some of his bodily remains, and this reliquary visits the parishes throughout the diocese. In the parish of Santa Isabel is kept the confessional used by the saint. In 2018 on the 100th anniversary of his ordination a relic was presented to the El Paso Diocese from the Diocese of Chihuahua. The wooden urn holding the relic was placed at Saint Patrick Cathedral in El Paso, Texas. A memorial in the nave of St. Patrick's commemorates his ordination there.

=== Patronage ===
Saint Peter of Jesus Maldonado is a patron of the Archdiocese of Chihuahua and of the Diocese of El Paso. As part of the twenty-five martyrs designated "Cristóbal Magallanes Jara and companions", he is commemorated on May 21. He is among the six priests of that group who were also members of the Knights of Columbus, and is considered a patron of that organization. His individual feast day is February 11, the day of his death.

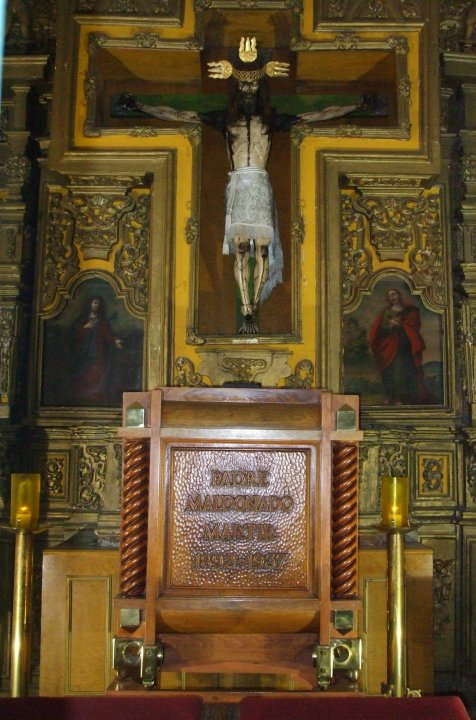
Relics of Peter of Jesus Maldonado in the Cathedral of Chihuahua.

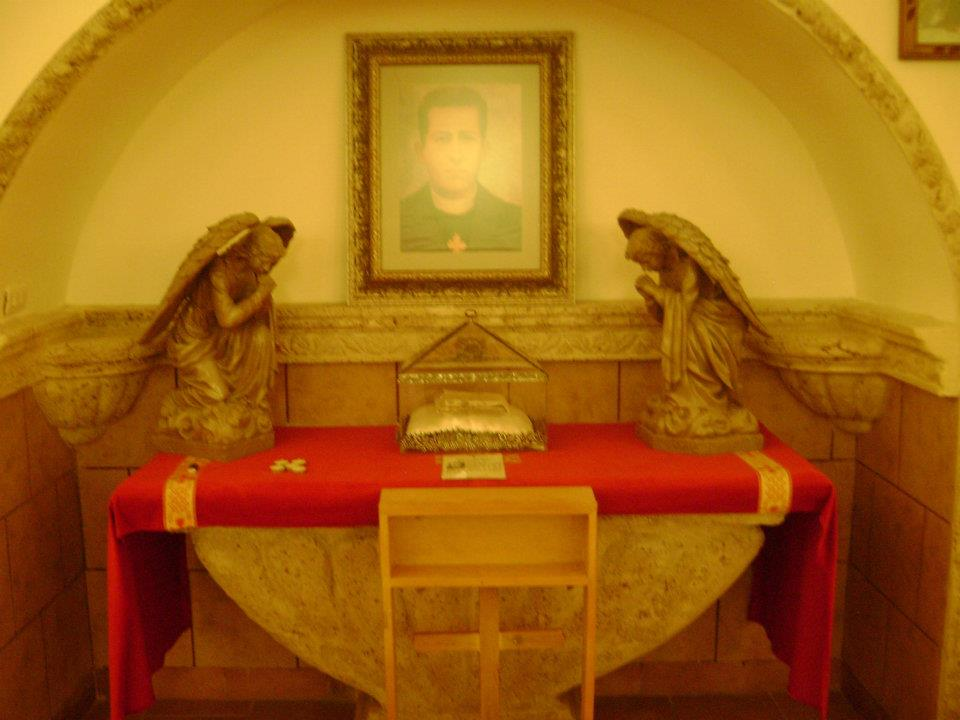
Cloth with Maldonado's blood kept at the Chapel of San José in Chihuahua.

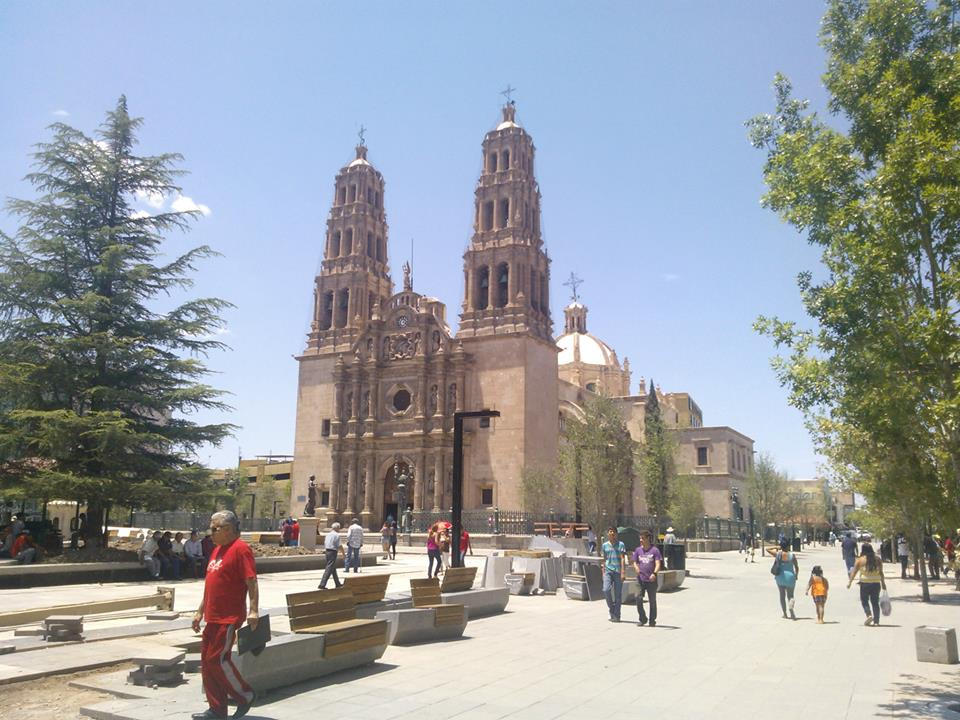
Cathedral of Chihuahua.

== Bibliography ==
- La Persecución Religiosa en Chihuahua. Gerald O'Rourke. Ed. Camino. 1991.
- El P. Maldonado, vivió y murió por Cristo. Mons. Martín Quiñones. Ed. Camino. 1989.
- El Mártir de Chihuahua. Javier H. Contreras Orozco. 1992.
- San Pedro de Jesús Maldonado: Con el Corazón en el cielo y el Sagrario. Gerald O'Rourke. Ed. Impresos Meoqui. 2002.
- El Martirio del P. Maldonado. Gerald O'Rourke. Librería Parroquial de Clavería. 2000.
- El Padre Maldonado, Apóstol y Mártir de la Eucaristía. J. Alfonso Ramos. Ed. Último Sello. 2011.
- San Pedro de Jesús Maldonado Lucero
- San Pedro de Jesús Maldonado Lucero, sacerdote mexicano mártir | Pregunta Santoral
