= Hope Border Institute =

Organization based in El Paso, Texas

- Abbreviation: HOPE
- Formation: 2015
- Founders: Dylan Corbett
- Type: Policy Institute, Humanitarian Agency
- Legal status: Public Charity
- Purpose: Justice and human rights advocacy, community organizing, humanitarian relief.
- Headquarters: El Paso, Texas.
- Executive Director: Dylan Corbett
- Website: www.hopeborder.org

The Hope Border Institute (or simply Hope) is an independent grassroots community organization which addresses issues concerning migration and the Mexico–US border. It works from a perspective founded in Catholic social teaching.

== About ==
Hope Border Institute is one of a number of organisations operating in El Paso which has been involved in recent events at the US-Mexican border concerning United States immigration policy. Its founding was a direct result of Pope Francis's direction that the Catholic Church should dedicate greater resources to supporting migrants in the Americas. It is a designated 501(c)(3) organisation. The founding executive director of the Hope Border Institute is Dylan Corbett, who was formerly an official of the Vatican's Section on Migrants & Refugees as well as the Vatican Dicastery for Promoting of Integral Human Development, and who previously held positions in the United States Conference of Catholic Bishops.

=== Border Refugee Assistance Fund ===
Through the Border Refugee Assistance Fund, the institute has provided support to initiatives and shelters in El Paso and in Ciudad Juárez which are responsible for the humanitarian needs of migrants arriving to the US-Mexico border. This has been in partnership with the Diocese of El Paso. This activity is directly connected to the U.S.-Mexico border crisis.

=== Remain in Mexico ===
In January 2019, the Department of Homeland Security instituted the Migrant Protection Protocols (MPP) or "Remain in Mexico" policy. This policy causes some asylum seekers to spend extended periods of time waiting in Mexico after arriving at the US-Mexican border with the intention of claiming asylum. The institute has been involved in policy campaigning concerning this issue, alongside providing support for migrants affected by this policy change and leading local community groups organising against the policy. One policy research analyst at the organisation highlighted the conditions Mexican asylum seekers endured as a result of the Remain in Mexico Policy, pointing to the freezing conditions for people sleeping beneath the three bridges between Ciudad Juárez and El Paso.

=== Family Detention ===
Hope Border Institute has been vocal in criticizing the Trump administration family separation policy, in part because much of this separation has occurred in El Paso. The organisation has provided advice concerning both the details of this policy development, and how to mount effective challenges to it.

== Immigration Policy Research ==
In 2017, the Hope Border Institute and the Borderland Immigration Council (BIC) launched a series of reports detailing the human impact and moral consequences of developments concerning the United States' immigration system, and the alleged militarization of the southern border.

== Publications ==
- Simon, Theodora; Tapia, Edith; Corbett, Dylan. 'Discretion to Deny: family separation, prolonged detention, and deterrence of asylum seekers at the hands of immigration authorities along the US-Mexico border.' Borderland Immigration Council, (February, 2017)
- Tapia, Edith; Perez-Bustillo, Camilo; Beller, Elli. 'Sealing The Border: the criminalization of asylum seekers in the Trump era.' Hope Border Institute, (January, 2018).
- 'Principles for Comprehensive Immigration Reform', Hope Border Institute, (2019).
- Tapia, Edith. 'Border Observatory: US Immigration Court Observation Manual.' Hope Border Institute, (2019).
