= John J. Brown =

American Roman Catholic priest and educator

John J. Brown, S.J. (also known as Ksistaki-Poka), was an American Roman Catholic priest and educator. A Blackfoot man, he was the first full-blooded Native American ordained to the Catholic priesthood.

Brown grew up in the eastern United States and attended Catholic school in Philadelphia and Browning, Montana. He continued his studies at Loyola University Chicago where he earned a degree in theology. He joined the Jesuit order and was ordained on June 16, 1948, at St. Ignatius Mission in Montana.
