= Cathedral High School (Texas) =

Location
- 1309 North Stanton Street; El Paso, Texas 79902; United States; 31°46′3″N 106°29′38″W

Information
- Other name: CHS
- Type: Private high school
- Religious affiliation: Roman Catholic
- Established: 1925
- Oversight: Roman Catholic Diocese of El Paso
- NCES School ID: 01324738
- Principal: Adolfo Sanchez
- Teaching staff: 27.0 (on an FTE basis)
- Grades: 9–12
- Gender: Boys
- Enrollment: 450 (2017-2018)
- Student to teacher ratio: 16.7
- Colors: Navy and Gold
- Athletics conference: Texas Association of Private and Parochial Schools
- Website: www.cathedral-elpaso.org

Cathedral High School (CHS) is a private, Roman Catholic, high school for boys in El Paso, Texas, United States. It was established in 1925 and is part of the Roman Catholic Diocese of El Paso.

== Notable alumni ==
- David Campos Guaderrama, judge
- Joe Moody, Speaker Pro Tempore of the Texas House of Representatives
- Sal Olivas, football player
- Rolando Pablos. executive, attorney, and politician
