= Mark J. Seitz =

American Catholic prelate (born 1954)

His Excellency, The Most Reverend Mark J. Seitz
- Bishop of El Paso
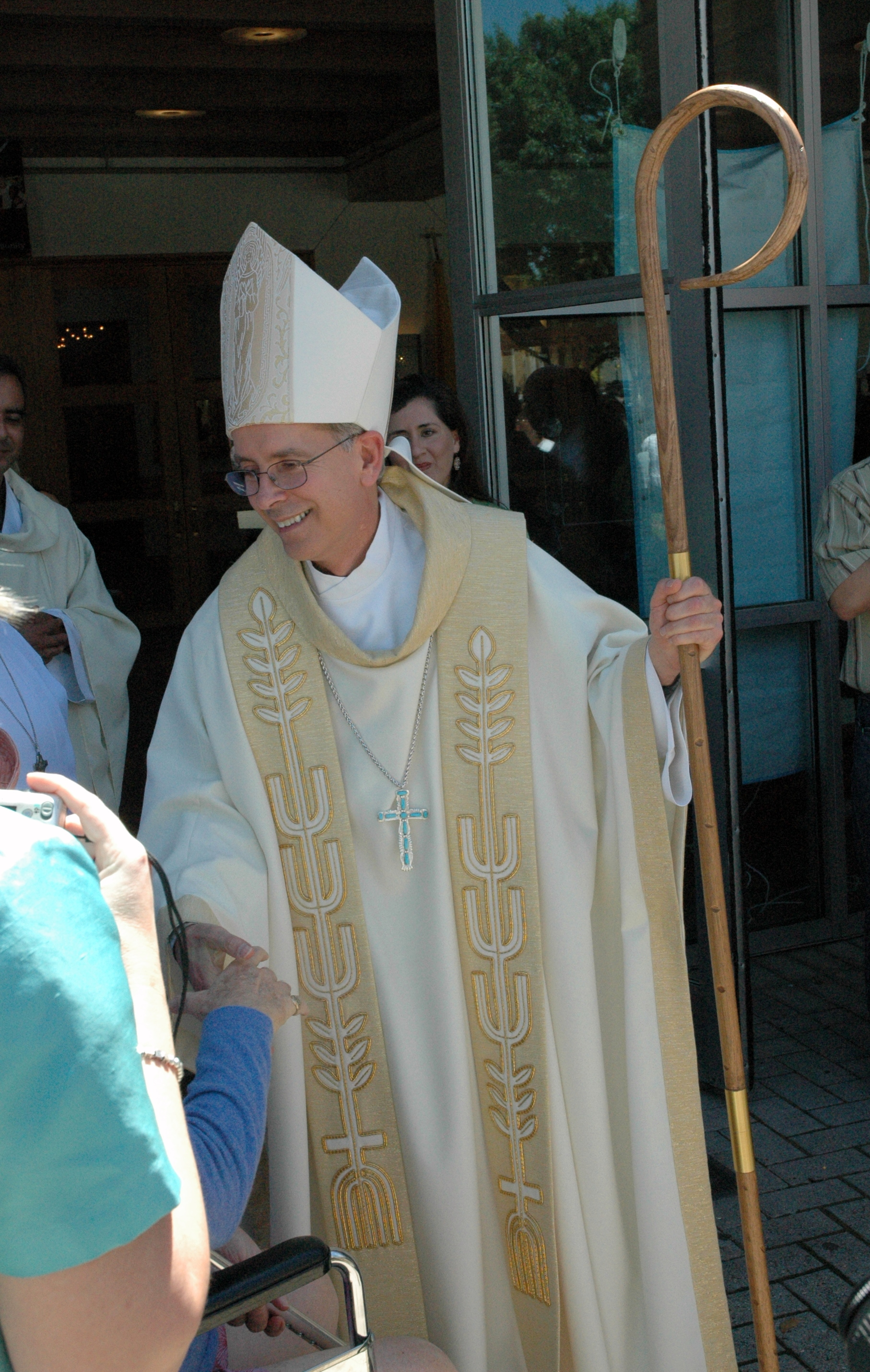
- Seitz in 2010
- Church: Catholic Church
- Diocese: El Paso
- Appointed: May 6, 2013
- Installed: July 9, 2013
- Predecessor: Armando Xavier Ochoa
- Previous posts: Auxiliary Bishop of Dallas & Titular Bishop of Cozyla (2010‍–‍2013)

Orders
- Ordination: May 17, 1980 by Thomas Tschoepe
- Consecration: April 27, 2010 by Kevin Joseph Farrell, Charles Victor Grahmann, Michael Duca

Personal details
- Born: January 10, 1954 (age 72) Milwaukee, Wisconsin, US
- Education: University of Dallas; Saint John's University; University of Notre Dame; Duquesne University
- Motto: Paratum cor meum (Latin for 'My heart is ready')

Styles of Mark Joseph Seitz
- Reference style: His Excellency
- Spoken style: Your Excellency
- Religious style: Bishop

Mark Joseph Seitz (born January 10, 1954) is an American Catholic prelate who has served as Bishop of El Paso since 2013. He previously served as an auxiliary bishop for the Diocese of Dallas from 2010 to 2013.

== Biography ==
=== Early life ===
Mark Seitz was born in Milwaukee, Wisconsin, on January 10, 1954, the eldest of ten siblings. In 1972, he entered Holy Trinity Seminary at the University of Dallas in Texas. He earned a Bachelor of Arts degree in philosophy in 1976 and a Master of Divinity degree in 1980.

== Ordination and ministry ==
Seitz was ordained to the priesthood for the Diocese of Dallas by Bishop Thomas A. Tschoepe at Saint Joan of Arc Church in Okauchee, Wisconsin, on May 17, 1980. The diocese assigned Seitz as a parochial vicar at Good Shepherd Parish in Garland, Texas. In 1982, Seitz earned a Master of Theology degree from the University of Dallas.

In 1985, Seitz attended Saint John's University in Collegeville, Minnesota, where he was awarded a Master of Liturgical Studies degree that same year. Seitz also took summer courses at the University of Notre Dame in Notre Dame, Indiana, and Duquesne University in Pittsburgh, Pennsylvania.

Starting in 1985, Seitz joined the faculty at the University of Dallas, teaching liturgy and sacramental theology. He also served the university in the following roles:

- associate spiritual director (1986 To 1987),
- director of liturgy (1986 to 1993)
- vice-rector of Holy Trinity Seminary (1987 to 1993).

Seitz left the University of Dallas in 1993 after being named pastor of St. Joseph Parish in Waxahachie, Texas. He also worked as an instructor at the Christ the Servant Institute in Dallas in 2001 and interned at the National Catholic Bioethics Center in Philadelphia, Pennsylvania, during the fall of 2002.

In 2003, the diocese transferred Seitz to serve as pastor of St. Rita's Parish in Dallas. Pope John Paul II named him as a prelate of honor in December 2004. In 2009, Seitz donated one of his kidneys to an ailing parishioner. In 2010, Seitz became pastor of All Saints Parish in Dallas.

Seitz was a member of the Presbyteral Council (1988 to 1993, 1999 to 2006 and 2007 to 2010), spiritual director of Dallas/Fort Worth Courage (1998 to 2010), a member of the Diocesan Honduras Solidarity Team (2002 to 2010), a member of the college of consultors of the diocese (2007 to 2010), spiritual director of the White Rose Women's Center in Dallas (2009 to 2010), and a board member of the BirthChoice Catholic Crisis Pregnancy Center (2009 to 2010).

=== Auxiliary Bishop of Dallas ===
On March 11, 2010, Pope Benedict XVI appointed Seitz as an auxiliary bishop of Dallas with the titular see of Cozyla.

Seitz was one of the first auxiliary bishops of Dallas since the creation of the diocese in 1969. Seitz received his episcopal consecration at the National Shrine Cathedral of Our Lady of Guadalupe in Dallas on April 27, 2010, from Bishop Kevin Farrell. Bishops Charles V. Grahmann and Michael Duca served as co-consecrators.

=== Bishop of El Paso ===
On May 6, 2013, Pope Francis appointed Seitz as bishop of El Paso. He was installed there on July 9, 2013.

== Viewpoints ==
=== Immigration ===
On July 18, 2017, Seitz issued a pastoral letter on immigration in which he said that "elected leaders have not yet mustered the moral courage to enact permanent, comprehensive immigration reform" and praised the efforts of the "heroic individuals, families, pastors, religious, parishes and institutions that spend themselves in service to migrants and refugees" and campaign "against the militarization of our border". He expressed concern for immigrant families who fear separation and for law enforcement officers who "put their lives on the line to stem the flow of weapons and drugs" but are "troubled in conscience by divisive political rhetoric and new edicts coming from Washington, D.C." He condemned profit-based immigrant detention centers, the hostility shown to asylum seekers, and "the disparagement of our Muslim brothers and sisters".

On June 27, 2019, Seitz and several members of the Hope Border Institute of El Paso, Texas, escorted seven Central American asylum seekers to the Paso del Norte International Bridge in Ciudad Juárez, Mexico to assist them in claiming asylum in the United States. In February 2022, Seitz condemned a lawsuit filed by Texas Attorney General Ken Paxton against Annunciation House, a Catholic charity in El Paso. Paxton accused the charity of harboring "illegal aliens".

=== Racism ===
In the aftermath of the El Paso Walmart shooting on August 3, 2019, Seitz wrote a pastoral letter on racism and white supremacy,

"If we are honest, racism is really about advancing, shoring up, and failing to oppose a system of white privilege and advantage based on skin color. When this system begins to shape our public choices, structure our common life together and becomes a tool of class, this is rightly called institutionalized racism. Action to build this system of hate and inaction to oppose its dismantling are what we rightly call white supremacy. This is the evil one and the ‘father of lies’ (John 8:44) incarnate in our everyday choices and lifestyles, and our laws and institutions."

In February 2020, Seitz, along with bishops from Texas, Arkansas, and Oklahoma, met with Pope Francis in Rome. The pope gave Seitz 50 rosaries that he personally blessed for survivors of the El Paso Walmart shooting.

== See also ==
- Catholic Church hierarchy
- Catholic Church in the United States
- Historical list of the Catholic bishops of the United States
- List of Catholic bishops of the United States
- Lists of patriarchs, archbishops, and bishops

== Episcopal succession ==
Catholic Church titles
Preceded by Armando Xavier Ochoa	Bishop of El Paso; 2013—Present	Succeeded by Incumbent
Preceded by -	Auxiliary Bishop of Dallas; 2010-2013	Succeeded by -
