= Diocese of El Paso =

Latin Catholic jurisdiction in the US

Coordinates: 31°47′25″N 106°25′24″W

Diocese of El Paso Dioecesis Elpasensis Diócesis de El Paso
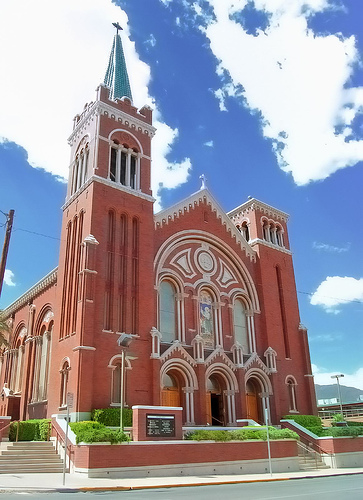
- St. Patrick's Cathedral

- Coat of arms

Location
- Country: United States
- Territory: Counties of El Paso, Brewster, Culberson, Hudspeth, Jeff Davis, Loving, Presidio, Reeves, Ward and Winkler
- Ecclesiastical province: Province of San Antonio
- Population: 668,000 (80.8%)

Information
- Denomination: Catholic
- Sui iuris church: Latin Church
- Rite: Roman Rite
- Established: 3 March 1914
- Cathedral: St. Patrick's Cathedral
- Patron saint: Saint Patrick

Current leadership
- Pope: Leo XIV
- Bishop: Mark J. Seitz
- Metropolitan Archbishop: Gustavo Garcia-Siller
- Auxiliary Bishops: Anthony Cerdan Celino

Map
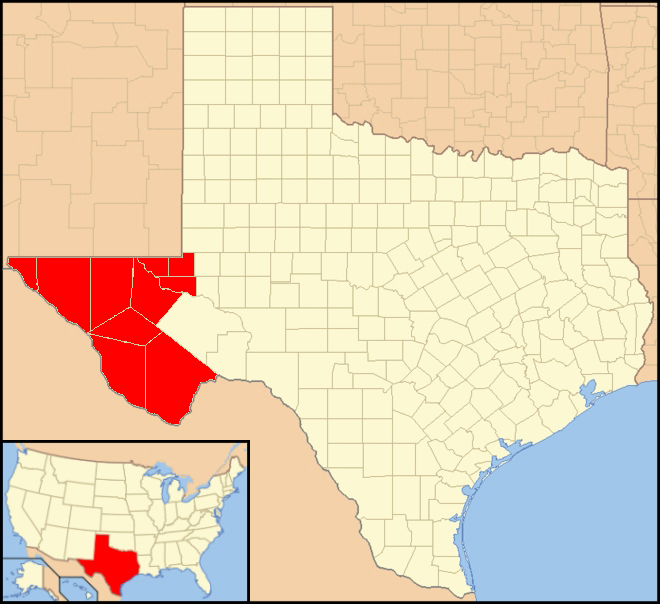

Website
- elpasodiocese.org

The Diocese of El Paso (Latin: Dioecesis Elpasensis, Spanish: Diócesis de El Paso) is a diocese of the Catholic Church in the El Paso Valley in Texas in the United States. It is a suffragan see of the metropolitan Archdiocese of San Antonio. The mother church is St. Patrick's Cathedral in El Paso. The bishop is Mark J. Seitz.

== Statistics ==
The Diocese of El Paso covers 26,686 square miles (69,120 km^{2}), it encompasses the Texas counties of El Paso, Brewster, Culberson, Hudspeth, Jeff Davis, Loving, Presidio, Reeves, Ward and Winkler.

As of 2025, the Catholic population of the diocese was approximately 686,000. The diocese had 56 parishes and 17 missions.

== History ==
=== Name changes ===
The El Paso region was part of several Catholic jurisdictions before becoming the Diocese of El Paso. The Diocese of Durango was under Spanish, then Mexican control. After 1850, the succeeding vicariates and dioceses were under American control.

- Diocese of Durango (1620 to 1850)
- Vicariate Apostolic of New Mexico (1850 to 1853)
- Diocese of Santa Fe (1853 to 1868)
- Vicariate Apostolic of Arizona (1881 to 1897)

From 1891 to 1914, the El Paso area was taken from the Vicariate Apostolic of Arizona and divided between the newly formed Dioceses of Dallas, San Antonio and Tucson.

=== 1600 to 1800 ===
During the 17th to early 18th centuries, all of present-day Texas and the American Southwest were part of the Spanish Colony of New Spain. Franciscan missionaries in the 1600s began evangelizing Pueblo clans in present-day New Mexico while also trying to suppress their cultural practices.

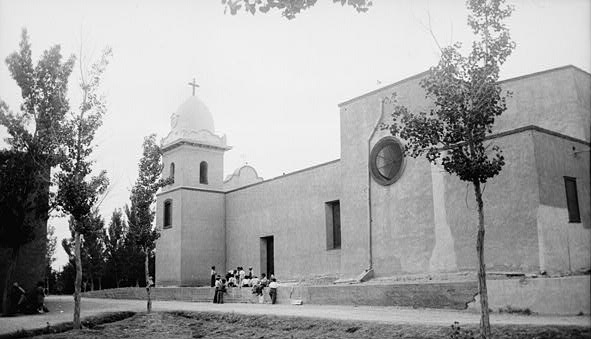
Ysleta Mission, El Paso, Texas (1936)

In 1680, several Pueblo clans in Santa Fe revolted against the Spanish, killing priests, settlers and soldiers. The Spanish were forced to flee to the El Paso Valley, taking many of their Native American enslaved people with them. Many in this group elected to stay in the valley instead of returning to Mexico. Several Catholic missionaries also stayed in El Paso.

The missionaries in 1680 established the Mission Corpus Christi de la Isleta del Sur in what is today the Mission Valley district of El Paso. The mission is considered the oldest continuously functioning parish in the United States. The same missionaries established the Mission Nuestra Señora de la Limpia Concepción de Los Piros de Socorro del Sur in present-day Socorro, Texas, that same year. Its purpose was to serve both Spaniards and native converts from New Mexico. In the 1770s, the missionaries built a presidio chapel at a Spanish military outpost in San Elizario.

=== 1800 to 1868 ===
After the Mexican War of Independence ended in 1821, the new Republic of Mexico took over Texas from Spain. After the Texas Revolution ended in 1836, East Texas became the new Republic of Texas. However, West Texas, including the El Paso Valley, remained disputed territory between Texas and Mexico. The Texas Republic became part of the United States in 1836.With the end of the Mexican–American War in 1848, Mexico surrendered control of West Texas to the United States.

San José de Concordia el Alto church was erected in 1859 on the site of the present Concordia Cemetery outside of El Paso. It was the nearest Catholic church for El Paso residents at the time. Often Catholics from El Paso boarded a hand-pulled ferry to attend mass at Our Lady of Guadalupe in Juárez.

=== 1868 to 1914 ===
The Sisters of Loretto opened St. Joseph's Academy, later to be called Loretto Academy, in 1879 in San Elizario. The first Catholic church in the City of El Paso, St. Mary's, was opened in 1882.

In the 1880s, the new railroad lines in El Paso brought an influx of Catholic immigrants. In 1892, the Jesuit missionary Carlos Pinto, superior of the Jesuits in the region, became pastor of St. Mary's Church in El Paso. Over the years, he established the Sacred Heart, Immaculate Conception, St. Ignatius, Guardian Angel, and Holy Family Parishes. Pinto sent Jesuits through the rural areas in West Texas and southern New Mexico by car and horseback. St. Mary's School was opened for Catholic children in 1903.

By the 1890s, many tuberculosis patients were coming to El Paso due to its healthful climate. To accommodate their needs, along with the growing city population, the Sisters of Charity opened the Hotel Dieu Hospital there in 1894. The Temple San Ignacio de Loyola was established in El Paso in 1905, and underwent extensive remodeling seven years later.

=== 1914 to 1924 ===
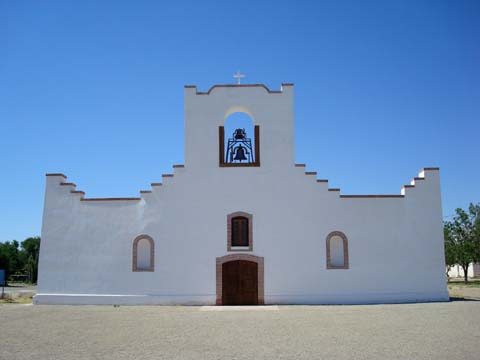
Socorro Mission, Socorro, Texas (2007)

On 3 March 1914, Pope Pius X established the Diocese of El Paso, with territory taken from the Dioceses of Dallas, San Antonio and Tucson. The new diocese contained counties in both southern New Mexico and West Texas. The pope named the Jesuit John J. Brown as first bishop of El Paso in January 1915, but poor health forced him to resign in June of that year. In 1915, the pope named the Jesuit Anthony Schuler as Brown's replacement.

At the beginning of Schuler's tenure in 1915, the diocese had 31 priests, 22 parishes, 58 missions, nine parochial schools, and three academies to serve 64,440 Catholics. Schuler oversaw the construction of St. Patrick's Cathedral in El Paso. To raise funds, the diocese announced that the first group to raise $10,000 would get to name the new cathedral. The winner was a group of Irish-Catholic women who chose "St. Patrick". At the time, El Paso was a major center of the mining industry in the region, with many of the miners being Irish Catholics.

During the Mexican Revolution of 1910 to 1920, Schuler provided refuge in El Paso for many clergy, members of religious orders and seminarians fleeing persecution in Mexico. One such refugee was the Mexican seminarian Peter of Jesus Maldonado, who Schuler ordained a priest in 1918. Maldonado returned to Mexico to serve in ministry; he was murdered in Santa Isabel, Mexico, in 1937.

=== 1924 to 1978 ===
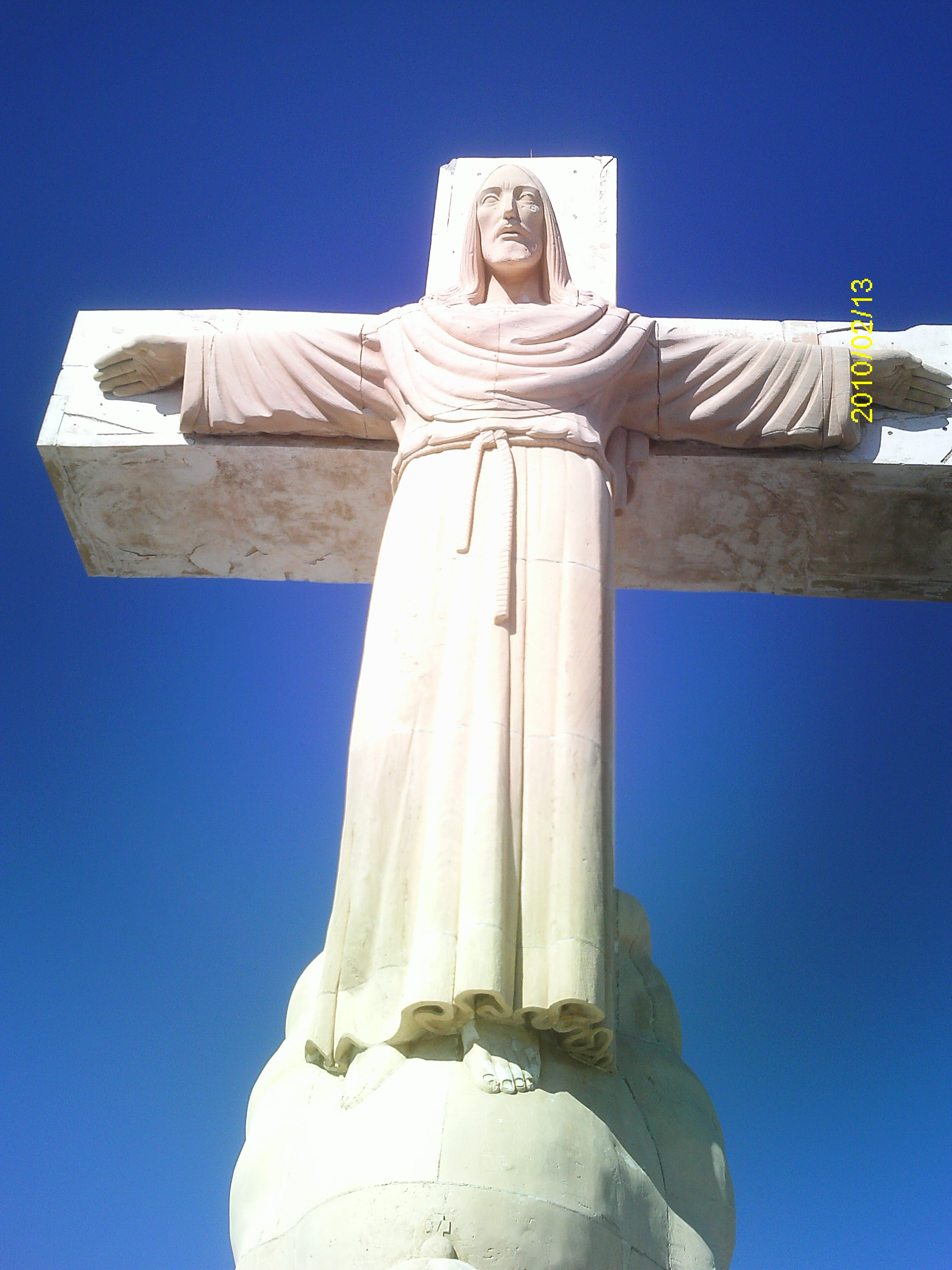
Christ the King Statue, Sunland, New Mexico (2010)

In 1924, Schuler opened St. Charles Borromeo Seminary and Cathedral High School in El Paso. In the 1930s, the diocese purchased 400 acres in Sunland Park, New Mexico, for the construction of a 40-foot statue of Jesus Christ. The American sculptor Urbici Soler y Manonelles completed the Christ the King statue in 1939. It overlooks Texas and New Mexico as well as the State of Chihuahua in Mexico.

In 1941, Pope Pius XII appointed Auxiliary Bishop Sidney Metzger of Santa Fe as coadjutor bishop of El Paso to assist Schuler. When Schuler retired in 1942, Metzger automatically succeeded him as bishop of El Paso.

During the first few years of his term, with the help of the Catholic Church Extension Society, Metzger travelled the United States making his appeal from the pulpit for funds to erect new apostolates needed by the diocese. Metzger built the current St. Charles Borromeo Seminary, two Catholic youth organization camps in the New Mexico mountains, and Holy Cross Retreat near Las Cruces.

In October 1961, the Vatican erected the Diocese of San Angelo from the eastern part of the Diocese of El Paso. Metzger oversaw the implementation of the Second Vatican Council's decrees in the diocese. Metzger was also a strong advocate for social justice issues such as the rights of workers to collective bargaining. In 1972, over 3,000 employees of Farah Manufacturing Company, a textile company, in El Paso went on strike in a work stoppage that lasted 20 months. Metzger gained national attention for his advocacy on behalf of the textile workers. At the time, Metzger said, "I feel that the company is acting unjustly in denying to the workers the basic right to collective bargaining." William Farah, president of Farah Manufacturing, labeled Metzger a member of the "rotten old bourgeoisie" and a man who is "lolling in wealth".

=== 1978 to 2000 ===
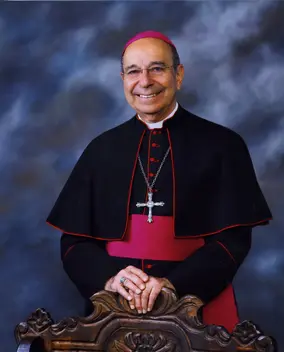
Bishop Ochoa (2023)

After Metzger retired in 1978, Pope Paul VI named Auxiliary Bishop Patrick Flores of San Antonio to succeed him. After serving just over one year in El Paso, Flores was named archbishop of San Antonio.

The next bishop of El Paso was Auxiliary Bishop Raymundo Peña of San Antonio, named by Pope John Paul II in 1980. Peña worked on social justice issues along with the cause of undocumented immigrants. In 1982, John Paul II erected the Diocese of Las Cruces, taking the New Mexico counties from the Diocese of El Paso. Peña established the Tepeyac Institute in El Paso in 1988 to prepare laity for service in diocesan ministries.

In 1994, John Paul II named Peña as bishop of the Diocese of Brownsville. His replacement in El Paso was Auxiliary Bishop Armando Xavier Ochoa of the Archdiocese of Los Angeles, appointed by the pope in 1996. Ochoa encouraged vocations to the priesthood and religious life, and the strengthening of diocesan ministries. In 1999, the diocese began a cooperative program with the Archdiocese of Atlanta for preparing seminarians from Georgia for ministry to their growing Hispanic population.

=== 2000 to present ===
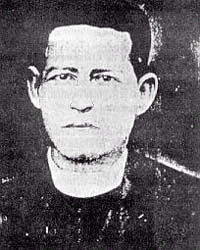
Father Maldonado (pre-1930), canonized in 2000

In 2000, Peter of Jesus Maldonado, the Mexican priest murdered in 1937, was canonized by John Paul II. In 2001, the diocese entered into a pact of solidarity with the Dioceses of Choluteca and Tegucigalpa in Honduras, along with the Diocese of Brownsville, in response to the devastation caused in 1998 by Hurricane Mitch. In 2004, Ochoa established the Committee on a Five-Year Plan for Vocations and a Committee on the Life and Ministry of Priests. He initiated the annual diocesan congresses. The diocese erected a memorial commemorating Maldonado's ordination in St. Patrick Cathedral in 2005.

Pope Benedict XVI appointed Ochoa as bishop of the Diocese of Fresno in 2011. In 2013, Pope Francis named Auxiliary Bishop Mark J. Seitz of Dallas to succeed Ochoa. An unknown party destroyed three statues of angels outside St. Pius X Church in El Paso in February 2021.

In July 2024, the El Paso District Court dismissed a lawsuit filed by Texas Attorney General Ken Paxton against Annunciation House, a shelter and service center for migrants crossing the Mexican border. Paxton had accused Annunciation House of violating a Texas law prohibiting assistance to undocumented immigrants.

In March 2026, the diocese filed for Chapter 11 bankruptcy protection in an effort to resolve sex abuse lawsuits dating back to the 1950s. Although the diocese claimed that its financial board was substantially stable, the decision to file for bankruptcy was due to pending court cases that could eventually cost them millions.As of 2026, Seitz is the bishop of El Paso.

=== Sexual abuse cases ===
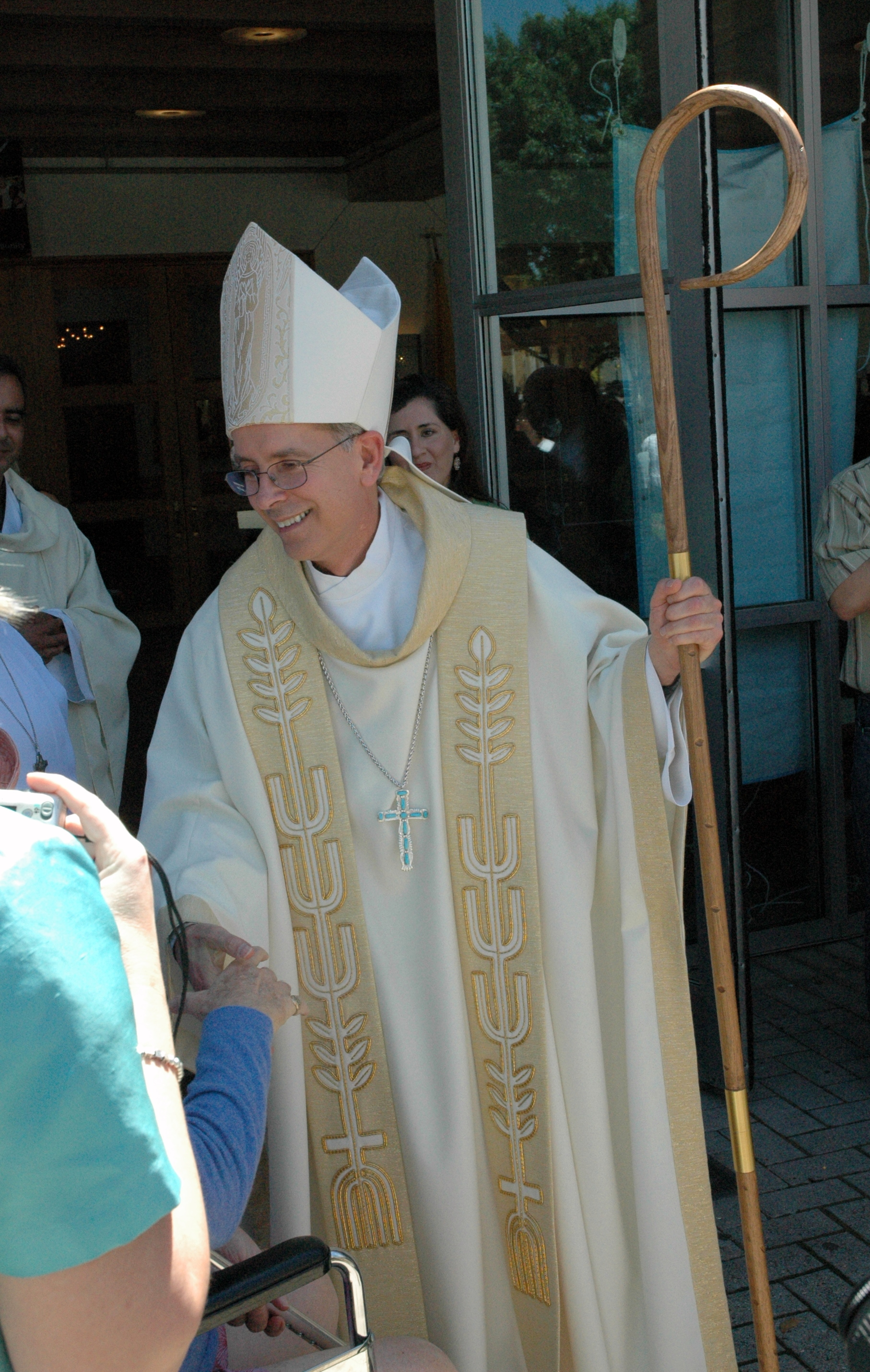
Bishop Seitz (2010)

In January 2019, the Diocese of El Paso released the names of 30 diocesan clergy who were "credibly accused" of committing sexual abuse acts against minors.

Miguel Luna was convicted in July 2019 of sexually assaulting a 12-year-old girl from 1991 to 1998 at an El Paso church. Two other women testified at his trial of being raped by Luna. He was convicted of sexual assault and sentenced to 18 years in state prison.

== Bishops ==
=== Bishops of El Paso ===
1. Anthony Joseph Schuler, S.J. (1915–1942)
2. Sidney Matthew Metzger (1942–1978)
3. Patrick Fernandez Flores (1978–1979), appointed Archbishop of San Antonio
4. Raymundo Joseph Peña (1980–1994), appointed Bishop of Brownsville
5. Armando Xavier Ochoa (1996–2011), appointed Bishop of Fresno
6. Mark Joseph Seitz (2013–present)

(John J. Brown, S.J. was appointed in 1915; did not take effect.)

=== Coadjutor Bishop ===
Sidney Matthew Metzger (1941–1942)

=== Auxiliary Bishops ===
Anthony Cerdan Celino (2023–present)

== Education ==
As of 2026, the Diocese of El Paso had three high schools, along with six elementary schools.

=== High Schools ===
- Cathedral High School – El Paso, high school
- Father Yermo Schools – El Paso, K-12
- Loretto Academy – El Paso, middle and high school
