= Armando Xavier Ochoa =

American prelate

His Excellency, The Most Reverend Armando Xavier Ochoa
- Bishop Emeritus of Fresno
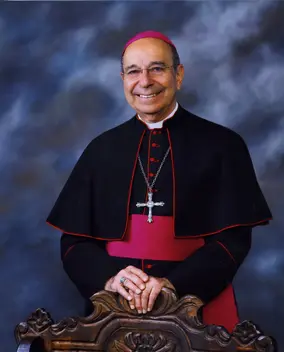
- Church: Roman Catholic
- Diocese: Fresno
- Appointed: December 1, 2011
- Installed: February 2, 2012
- Retired: March 5, 2019
- Predecessor: John Thomas Steinbock
- Successor: Joseph Vincent Brennan
- Previous posts: Bishop of El Paso (1996-2012); Auxiliary Bishop of Los Angeles and Titular Bishop of Sitifis (1987-1996)

Orders
- Ordination: May 23, 1970 by Timothy Manning
- Consecration: February 23, 1987 by Roger Mahony, Joseph Martin Sartoris, Thomas John Curry, and Gabino Zavala

Personal details
- Born: April 9, 1943 (age 83) Oxnard, California, US
- Motto: Preparemos el camino del Señor (Let us prepare the way of the Lord)

Styles of Armando Xavier Ochoa
- Reference style: His Excellency; The Most Reverend
- Spoken style: Your Excellency
- Religious style: Bishop

Armando Xavier Ochoa (born April 9, 1943) is an American Catholic retired prelate who served as bishop of Fresno in California (2011 to 2019), bishop of El Paso in Texas (1996 to 2011) and as an auxiliary bishop for the Archdiocese of Los Angeles in California (1986 to 1996).

== Biography ==
=== Early life ===
Armando Xavier Ochoa was born on April 9, 1943, in Oxnard, California. The second child of Angel and Mary Ochoa, he attended Santa Clara Elementary School in that city. Ochoa graduated from Santa Clara High School in 1961, then entered St. John's Seminary College in Camarillo, California, in 1962 and later, St. John's Seminary School of Theology in Camarillo.

=== Priesthood ===
Ochoa was ordained into the priesthood by Cardinal Timothy Manning for the Archdiocese of Los Angeles on May 23, 1970. After his ordination, Ochoa was assigned as assistant pastor over time at three parishes in Southern California:

- St. Alphonsus in East Los Angeles
- St. John the Baptist in Baldwin Park
- St. Teresa of Avila in Los Angeles

In 1982, while working at St. Teresa, Ochoa was named by the Vatican as chaplain of his holiness, with the title of monsignor. Two years later, Ochoa was appointed pastor of Sacred Heart Parish in Los Angeles.

Ochoa's archdiocesan positions included co-director of the Permanent Diaconate Program, heading the Secretariat for Ethnic Ministry Services, He was also a member of the board for Don Bosco Technical High School in Rosemead, California, and St. John's Seminary.

=== Auxiliary Bishop of Los Angeles ===
Ochoa was named titular bishop of Sitifis and an auxiliary bishop for Los Angeles by Pope John Paul II in December 1986. Ochoa was consecrated on February 23, 1987, at the Los Angeles Memorial Sports Arena by Cardinal Roger Mahony.

=== Bishop of El Paso ===
On April 1, 1996, John Paul II named Ochoa as bishop of El Paso. He was installed on June 26.

=== Bishop of Fresno ===
On December 1, 2011, Pope Benedict XVI appointed Ochoa as bishop of Fresno, succeeding Bishop John Steinbock, who had died in December 2010. On February 1, 2019, Ochoa announced an outside investigation of the diocese human resource records for all allegations of sexual abuse against clerics since 1922, with a report to be issued to the public after the investigation had concluded.

On March 5, 2019, Pope Francis accepted Ochoa's letter of resignation as bishop of the Diocese of Fresno.

== Positions ==
Ochoa considers the ordination of woman priests to be a moot point due to papal opposition; he believes that gay men and lesbians should remain celibate in accordance with Catholic doctrine requiring all unmarried people to remain celibate; he believes that the priest shortage will be solved through faith rather than through allowing priests to marry; and he fears that teaching children about condoms in a school setting would send a "mixed message" regarding premarital sex.

Ochoa is an advocate of diocesan foster care programs and responsible water use.

== See also ==
Catholic Church titles
| Preceded by John Steinbock | Bishop of Fresno; 2012-2019 | Succeeded by Joseph Vincent Brennan |
| Preceded by Raymundo Joseph Peña | Bishop of El Paso; 1996-2012 | Succeeded by Mark J. Seitz |
| Preceded by - | Auxiliary Bishop of Los Angeles; 1987-1996 | Succeeded by - |
