= The Modern Jewish Girl's Guide to Guilt =

Anthology

The Modern Jewish Girl's Guide to Guilt is an anthology featuring work by authors including Aimee Bender.

It won a National Jewish Book Award in 2005 in Women's Studies. Ms. Ellenson and her father, Rabbi David Ellenson, won the National Jewish Book Award in the same year, 2005—the only father and daughter to do so since Abraham Joshua Heschel and Susannah Heschel.

The book has been chosen by Hadassah as a 2007 book group selection.
