= Steven Windmueller =

American Jewish communal scholar (born 1942)

Steven F. Windmueller
- Born: 1942
- Education: University of Pennsylvania (Ph.D., International Relations, 1973)
- Occupation: Scholar · Academic · Consultant
- Years active: 1969–present
- Organizations: Hebrew Union College–Jewish Institute of Religion
- Known for: Expert on American Jewish communal affairs, anti‑Semitism, and political behavior; longtime leader in Jewish federations and nonprofit management
- Notable work: You Shall Not Stand Idly By (2004); Predictability to Chaos?? (2005); The Impact of Donald Trump’s Presidency on American Jews (2021); The Quest for Power (2014)
- Spouse: Michelle Pearlman Windmueller

Steven Windmueller is an American scholar and Jewish communal professional. He is a professor emeritus at the Hebrew Union College-Jewish Institute of Religion in Los Angeles, CA where he teaches courses on contemporary political issues and American Jewish affairs. He is a fellow at the Jerusalem Center for Public Affairs, and a board member of the Jewish Federation and the Jewish Family Service of Los Angeles.

Windmueller is an author in the field of Jewish political studies, having written more than 100 articles, books and essays on such topics as anti-Semitism, American Jewish political behavior, Jewish institutional trends, Jewish power and the Middle East. He is a contributing author to eJewish Philanthropy, the Jewish Week and the Jewish Journal, and has appeared in the Los Angeles Times, the Jewish Daily Forward, CNN, PBS and NBC.

== Career ==
Windmueller received a doctorate in International Relations from the University of Pennsylvania in 1973, and then launched his professional career on staff of the American Jewish Committee. He served twelve years as the executive director of the Jewish Federation in Albany, New York (1973-1985), and ten years as the executive director of the Los Angeles Jewish Federation's Community Relations Committee (1985-1995). In 1995, he joined the faculty of the Hebrew Union College. He would direct its School of Jewish Communal Service (now the School of Jewish Nonprofit Management) from 1995-2005, before becoming dean of the Los Angeles campus in 2006, a position he held until 2010. In 2009, HUC President David Ellenson appointed Windmueller to the Rabbi Alfred Gottschalk Chair in Jewish Communal Service, one of only twelve endowed HUC faculty positions.

During his career, he has consulted with government officials and political candidates; has represented the Jewish community on various international missions; and has contributed a number of articles and essays to the growing field of Jewish political studies.

In 1999, Windmueller received a grant from the John Randolph Haynes Foundation to undertake the first major study of Jewish-Latino relations in Los Angeles. Key elements of this research have appeared in various publications, including the book California Jews (Brandeis, 2003). His Pew-funded research on the major national Jewish community relations agencies appeared in a 2002 publication, Jewish Polity and American Civil Society: Communal Agencies and Religious Movements in the American Public Square (Rowman and Littlefield), and in 2004, he produced a textbook on the practice of Jewish community relations, titled You Shall Not Stand Idly By (American Jewish Committee). In December 2003, Windmueller released several studies on Jewish voting patterns, including the article Are American Jews Becoming Republican? Insights into Jewish Political Behavior, which was published by the Jerusalem Center for Public Affairs. In early 2005, Windmueller collaborated with Professor Gerald Bubis in producing the first study on the formation of the UJC (United Jewish Communities), titled Predictability to Chaos?? How American Jewish Leaders Reinvented their National Jewish Communal System. His work in 2007 on The Second American Jewish Revolution has appeared in several different publications; this research was followed by a 2008 article called A Jewish Perspective on the Global Economic Revolution, which was published by the University of Southern California's Casden Institute, in its Annual Review (Volume 6). That same year, the Jerusalem Center for Public Affairs released his study on Jewish Communities of the West. In May 2014, he released his book The Quest for Power: A Study in Jewish Political Behavior and Practice, which explores the political culture of Judaism from biblical times to the contemporary era. A few years ago, Windmueller launched The Wind Report, an interactive website and online repository for his extensive writings on Jewish public affairs and global social trends.

== Selected publications and edited works ==
=== Books ===
- You Shall Not Stand Idly By: A Jewish Community Relations Workbook (American Jewish Committee, 2004)
- Predictability to Chaos?? How American Jewish Leaders Reinvented their National Jewish Communal System (Jerusalem Center for Public Affairs, 2005)
- In this Time and In this Place: American Jewry 3.0 (Amazon, 2014)
- The Quest for Power: A Study in Jewish Political Behavior and Practice (Amazon, 2014)
- The Impact of the Presidency of Donald Trump on American Jewry and Israel. (Purdue University Press, 2021).

=== Other publications ===
- “The Jewish Contract with America” Dan Schnur, Ed. in American Politics and the Jewish Community, Volume 11, Casden Institute for the Study of the Jewish Role in American Life (Purdue University Press, 2013)
- “A Jewish Perspective on the Global Economic Revolutions in a Post-Holocaust World,” Bruce Zuckerman, Ed. In The Impact of the Holocaust in America, Volume 6, Casden Institute for the Study of the Jewish Role in American Life (Purdue University Press, 2006)
- “Through the Lens of Latino-Jewish Relations” Ava Kahn and Marc Dollinger (eds.) California Jews, (University Press of New England, 2003)

== Personal life ==
Windmueller is married to Michelle Pearlman Windmueller.
