= Hebrew Union College – Jewish Institute of Religion =

American graduate school of religion

Coordinates: 31°46′34″N 35°13′22″E

Hebrew Union College
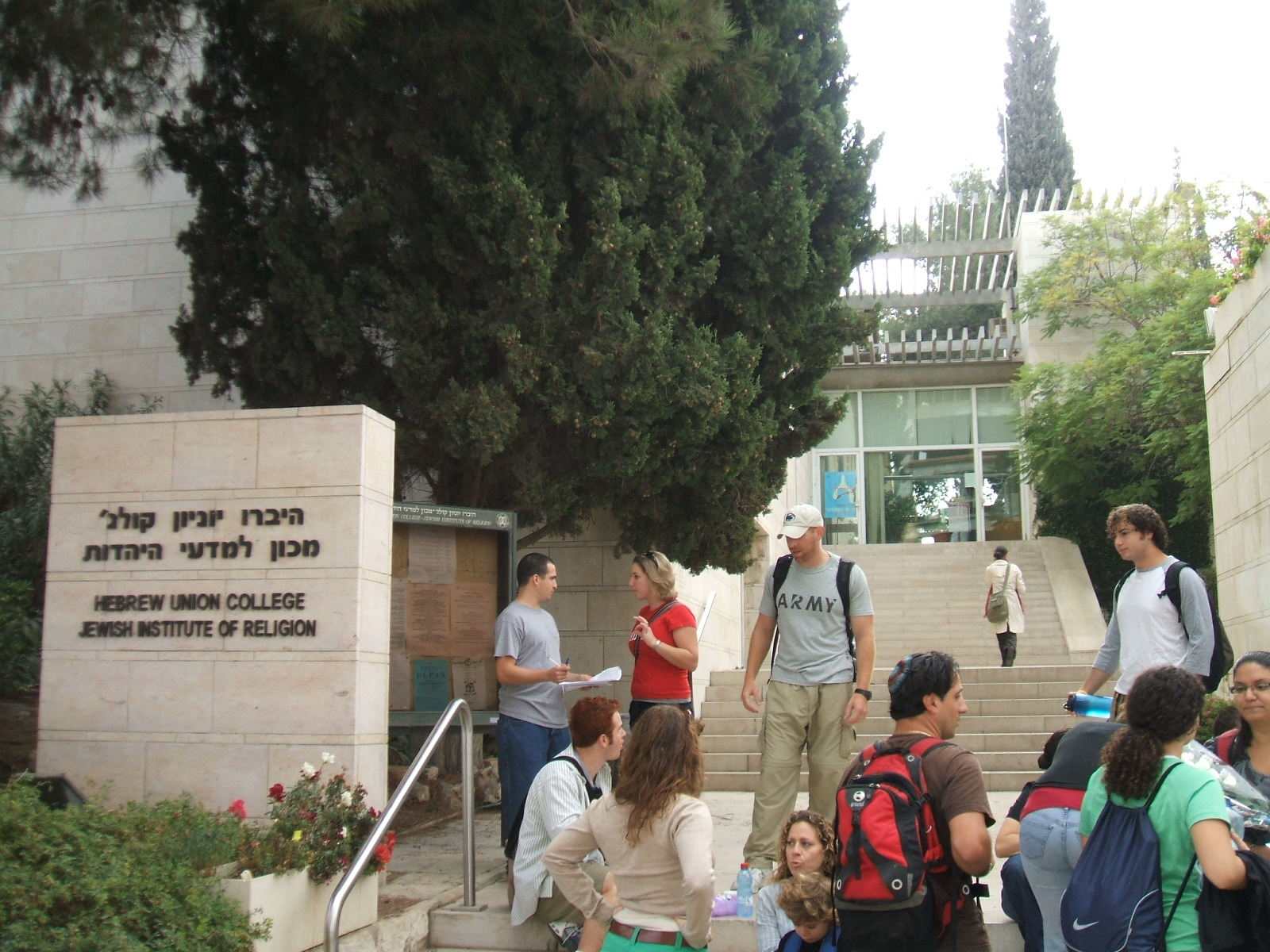
- HUC campus in Jerusalem
- Type: Private
- Established: 1875; 151 years ago
- Affiliations: Union for Reform Judaism, SOCHE
- President: Andrew Rehfeld
- Location: Cincinnati; New York City; Los Angeles; Jerusalem
- Website: www.huc.edu
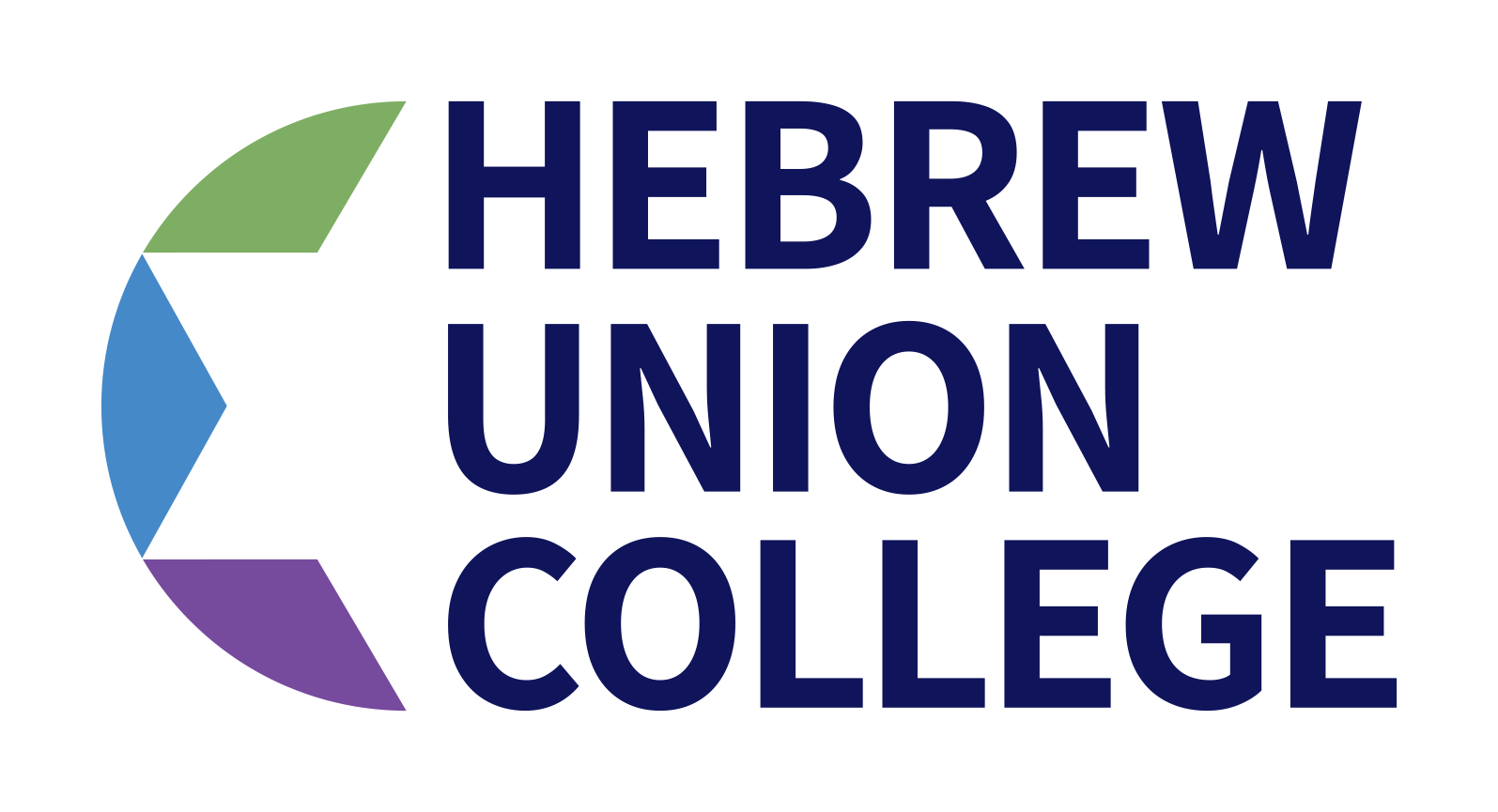

The Hebrew Union College – Jewish Institute of Religion (commonly known as Hebrew Union College or abbreviated as HUC) is an institution of higher Jewish education and the academic, spiritual, and professional leadership development center of Reform Judaism. It has three locations in the United States and one location in Jerusalem. It is the oldest extant Jewish seminary in the Americas and the main seminary for training rabbis, cantors, educators and communal workers in Reform Judaism. Hebrew Union College has campuses in Cincinnati, New York City, Los Angeles, and Jerusalem. The Jerusalem campus is the only seminary in Israel for training Reform Jewish clergy.

== History ==
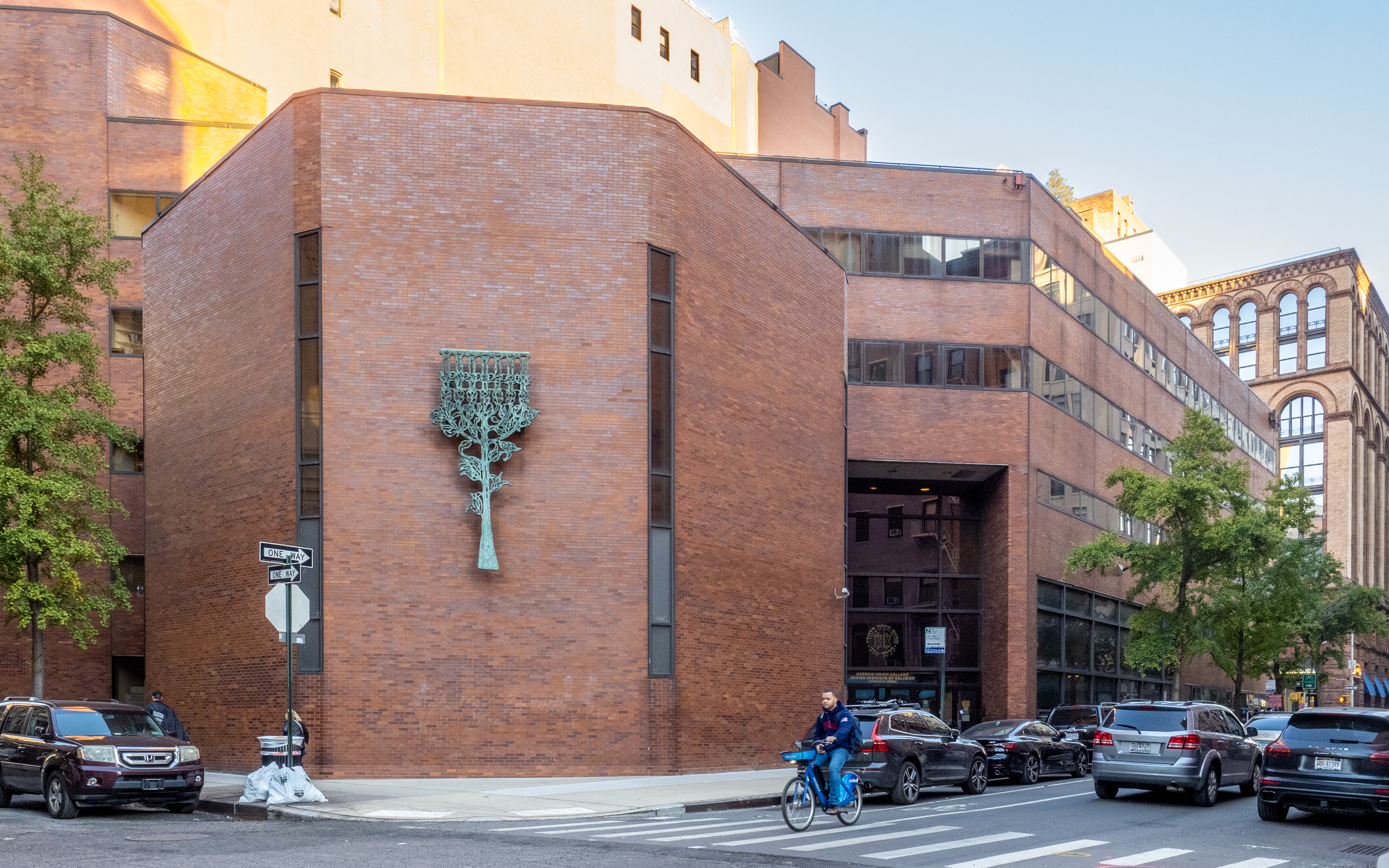
HUC Greenwich Village, New York

Hebrew Union College was founded in Cincinnati in 1875 under the leadership of Rabbi Isaac Mayer Wise. Jacob Ezekiel was Secretary of the Board, registrar, and treasurer from the college's inception until just before his death in 1899. The first rabbinical class graduated in 1883. The graduation banquet for this class became known as the Trefa Banquet because it included food that was not kosher, such as clams, soft-shell crabs, shrimp, frogs' legs and dairy products served immediately after meat. At the time, Reform rabbis were split over the question of whether the Jewish dietary restrictions were still applicable. Some of the more traditionalist Reform rabbis thought the banquet menu went too far, and sought an alternative between Reform Judaism and Orthodox Judaism which led to the founding of American Conservative Judaism.

In 1950, Hebrew Union College gained a second campus when it merged with the rival Reform Jewish Institute of Religion in New York. The Jewish Institute of Religion was previously affiliated with the Stephen Wise Free Synagogue next door. Additional campuses were added in Los Angeles in 1954 and in Jerusalem in 1963.

In 1979, Hebrew Union College moved its New York campus from the original Jewish Institute of Religion building to 1 West Fourth Street in Greenwich Village. The Jewish Association for Services for the Aged took over the building until 1997, when the Ramaz School, in an expansion deal for itself and York Prep School, bought the building and traded it with York for their prior campus on the block of Ramaz. In January 2025, the building on West 4th Street was sold to New York University for $75 million. HUC will leave the property by 2027, pending renovation of its new location in another building in Manhattan. In February 2025, the college acquired the First Battery Armory to serve as its new location following a renovation to be completed in 2027.

Hebrew Union College is an international seminary and graduate school offering a wide variety of academic and professional programs. In addition to its Rabbinical School, the College includes Schools of Graduate Studies, Education, Jewish Non-Profit Management, and sacred music, a program in Biblical archaeology and an Israeli rabbinical program.

The Los Angeles campus runs many of its programs and degrees in cooperation with the neighboring University of Southern California. Their 50-year collaboration includes the creation of the Center for Muslim-Jewish Engagement, an interfaith think tank through the partnership of HUC, USC, and Omar Foundation. CMJE holds religious text-study programs across Los Angeles.

Rabbi Alfred Gottschalk was appointed as Hebrew Union College's sixth president, following the death of Nelson Glueck. As president, Gottschalk oversaw the growth and expansion of the Hebrew Union College campuses, the ordination of Sally Priesand as the first female rabbi in the United States, the investiture of Reform Judaism's first female hazzan and the ordination of Naamah Kelman as the first female rabbi to be ordained in Israel.

In 1996, Rabbi Sheldon Zimmerman was appointed as the 7th President of Hebrew Union College. He was succeeded in 2000 by Rabbi David Ellenson as the 8th President. The 9th president of Hebrew Union College, elected in 2014, was Rabbi Aaron D. Panken, Ph.D. A noted authority on rabbinic and Second Temple literature, with research interests in the historical development of legal concepts and terms, Rabbi Panken was killed in a plane crash on May 5, 2018, while piloting a single-engine Aeronca 7AC over New York's Hudson Valley.

Andrew Rehfeld was elected the 10th president on December 18, 2018, and inaugurated at Plum Street Temple in Cincinnati on October 27, 2019.

On April 11, 2022, the Board of Governors at Hebrew Union College voted to shutter the residential rabbinical program in Cincinnati by 2026 due to financial troubles and falling enrollment. Also in 2022, Hebrew Union College for the first time granted a certificate of ordination to a nonbinary candidate.

== Debbie Friedman School of Sacred Music ==
The cantorial school of the Hebrew Union College was founded in 1948. The school is located on the New York campus at One West Fourth Street. It offers a five-year graduate program, conferring the degree of Master of Sacred Music in the fourth year and ordination as cantor in the fifth year.

Cantorial studies at Hebrew Union College begins with the Year-In-Israel in Jerusalem and continues for the next four years in New York. While in Israel, students study Hebrew, and Jewish music, and get to know Israel. Cantorial students study alongside Rabbinical and Education students. In New York, the program includes professional learning opportunities as a student-cantor, in which students serve congregations within and outside of the NY area.

The curriculum includes liturgical music classes covering traditional Shabbat, High Holiday and Festival nusach, Chorus, Musicology, Reform Liturgy and Composition; Judaica and text classes such as Bible, Midrash and History; and professional development. Each student is assigned practica (mini-recitals) during the 2nd, 3rd, and 4th year of school culminating with a Senior Recital (based on a thesis) during the 5th year.

Rabbi David Ellenson, then president of Hebrew Union College, announced on January 27, 2011, that the School of Sacred Music would be renamed the Debbie Friedman School of Sacred Music in honor of Debbie Friedman. The renaming officially occurred on December 7, 2011.

== Women's equality ==
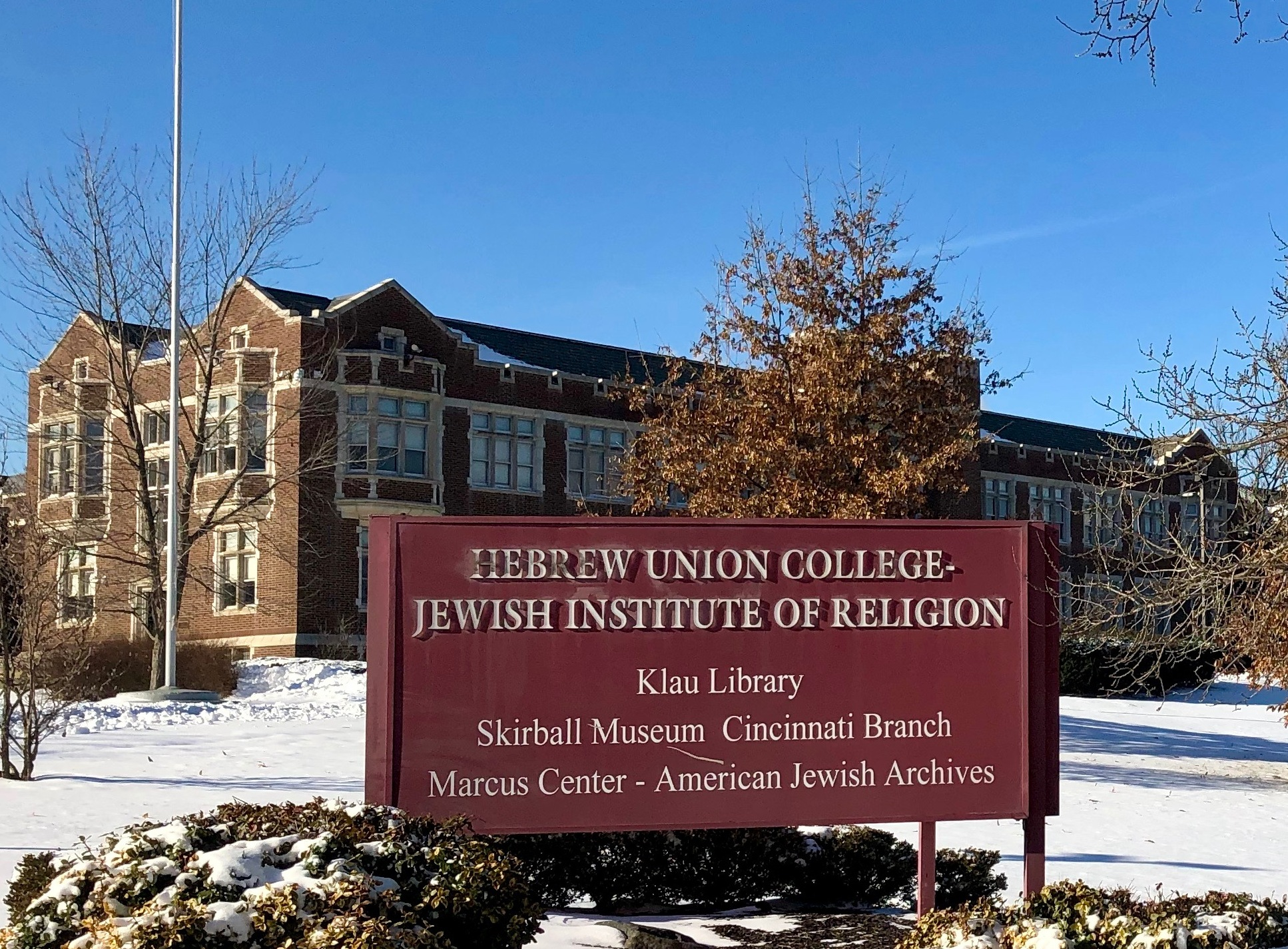
Ohio campus building

Hebrew Union College has both male and female students in all its programs, including rabbinic and cantorial studies. Julia Ettlinger (1863–1890) became its first female student in 1875. As of January 2022, it has 839 women rabbinical graduates. (See Women rabbis). The first female rabbi to be ordained by Hebrew Union College was Sally Priesand, ordained in 1972, the only woman in a class with 35 men. The first female cantor to be invested by Hebrew Union College was Barbara Ostfeld in 1975.

After four years of deliberation, Hebrew Union College decided to give women a choice of wording on their ordination certificates beginning in 2016, including the option to have the same wording as men. Up until then, male candidates' certificates identified them by the Reform movement's traditional "morenu harav", or "our teacher the rabbi", while female candidates' certificates only used the term "rav u’morah", or "rabbi and teacher". Sally Priesand herself was unaware that her certificate referred to her any differently than her male colleagues until it was brought to her attention years later. Rabbi Mary Zamore, executive director of the Reform movement's Women's Rabbinic Network, explained that the Hebrew Union College was uncomfortable with giving women the same title as men. In 2012 she wrote to Rabbi David Ellenson, Hebrew Union College's then president, requesting that he address the discrepancy, which she said was "smacking of gender inequality".

In 2021, following new reports about sexual abuse by former Hebrew Union College president Sheldon Zimmerman and recently deceased professor Michael Cook, three separate Reform organizations began internal investigations of sexual harassment and other forms of discrimination. Hebrew Union College retained the law firm Morgan Lewis, who conducted 170 interviews addressing incidents beginning in the 1970s. The report described the culture at the school's campuses as a "good old boys" mindset demonstrating favoritism towards cisgender men, particularly at the Cincinnati and Jerusalem campuses. It found that students and administration were reluctant to confront professors over repeated incidents of harassment and discrimination, as many of the perpetrators are or were revered scholars in their field, and complaints were often swept under the rug. Former professors Steven M. Cohen, Michael Cook, and Stephen Passamaneck, Director of Litiurgical Arts and Music Bonia Shur, and former presidents Alfred Gottschalk and Sheldon Zimmerman were reported to be the subject of repeated credible allegations of sexual harassment. The report recommended renaming or removing endowed chairs, scholarships, statues, and buildings that honor the wrongdoers. The school's current president and board both stated that they would make teshuvah (repent), work to prevent such incidents, and revise policies for handling misconduct complaints.

As of 2021, Hebrew Union College has undertaking annual teshuvah processes to strengthen a sacred and respectful community aligned with its highest Jewish values. As part of this effort, Hebrew Union College has implemented a holistic plan of strategic and operational change to rebuild trust, promote healing, and ensure a safe, equitable, and values-driven institutional culture.

The process began in 2020 with the convening of the Presidential Task Force on Safe and Respectful Environments and continued after the 2021 release of the Morgan Lewis investigation report.

Key initiatives include facilitated listening circles, reissuance of graduation documents, reaffirmation of ordination ceremonies, communications that elevate the experience of impacted parties, and quarterly updates that share progress with the Hebrew Union College community.

== Resources ==
The Hebrew Union College library system contains one of the most extensive Jewish collections in the world. Each campus has its own library:

- Klau Library in Cincinnati, the main research library. This library is the second-largest collection of printed Jewish material in the world (the National Library of Israel in Jerusalem is the first). The library states it has 700,000 volumes, including 150 incunabula and over 2,000 manuscript codices.
- Klau Library in New York – 130,000 volumes.
- S. Zalman and Ayala Abramov Library in Jerusalem – 100,000 volumes.
- Frances-Henry Library in Los Angeles – 100,000 volumes.

The three U.S. campuses share a catalog, but the Jerusalem collection is separately cataloged.

== Publications ==
Hebrew Union College operates Hebrew Union College Press, a university press, through which it releases Jewish Studies–related publications. It also issues a yearbook of studies titled Hebrew Union College Annual, published since 1924.

== Museum ==
The Dr. Bernard Heller Museum at Hebrew Union College in New York presents exhibitions highlighting Jewish history, culture, and contemporary creativity.

Since its founding in 1983 as the Joseph Gallery, the museum has grown physically to encompass 5,000 square feet (460 m^{2}) of exhibition space, expanding to include the Petrie Great Hall, Klingenstein Gallery, Heller Gallery and Backman Gallery.

The Hebrew Union College in Los Angeles originally housed The Skirball Museum. The museum collection moved to the Skirball Cultural Center in Los Angeles when the Center opened in 1996. The Skirball Cultural Center is independent of Hebrew Union College, however, both organizations continue to collaborate on select programs and exhibitions.

The Hebrew Union College also manages the Skirball Cultural Center in Los Angeles and Skirball Museum in Jerusalem.

== Jewish Language Project ==
The Jewish Language Project (JLP), run by Professor Sarah Bunin Benor at Hebrew Union College, is a research program dedicated to the preservation of Jewish diasporic languages. The project also seeks to raise awareness among Jewish communities about Jewish languages around the world, both those that are endangered and those that are emerging. The JLP was launched in 2020 and its activities include convening organizations and scholars to document endangered Jewish languages and created collaborative dictionaries for emerging Jewish languages. JLP's initiatives include the creation of a comprehensive resource on Jewish languages in the form of a series on online dictionaries, with information on over 30 different languages, including their history, grammar, vocabulary, and cultural significance. Most prominent is the Jewish English Lexicon, an online dictionary of words derived from various Jewish languages that Jews use when they are speaking English. Other initiatives concern endangered Jewish languages and feature documentation to preserve terms and phrases.

A related project is the Comprehensive Aramaic Lexicon, an online dictionary and text database of different Aramaic varieties.

== Notable faculty ==
Notable faculty members have included Rabbi Judah Magnes, who was also the founding chancellor and president of Hebrew University of Jerusalem Rabbi Israel Bettan, Rabbi Abraham Cronbach, Rabbi Tamara Cohn Eskenazi, Rabbi Abraham Joshua Heschel, David Neumark, Rabbi Leo Baeck, Gerald Bubis, Rabbi Nelson Glueck, Moses Buttenweiser, Eugene Borowitz, Jacob Z. Lauterbach, Jacob Mann, Rabbi Lawrence A. Hoffman, Henry Slonimsky, Rabbi Louis Grossmann, Rabbi Moses Mielziner, Rabbi Julian Morgenstern, Rabbi Alvin J. Reines, Steven Windmueller, Debbie Friedman, Rachel Adler, Sivan Zakai, Rabbi Wendy Zierler, Rabbi Michael Marmur and Carole B. Balin, as well as Sami Rohr Choicie Award for Jewish Literature and National Jewish Book Award recipient Sarah Bunin Benor.

== Notable alumni ==
- Israel Aaron, rabbi and published scholar (1859–1912)

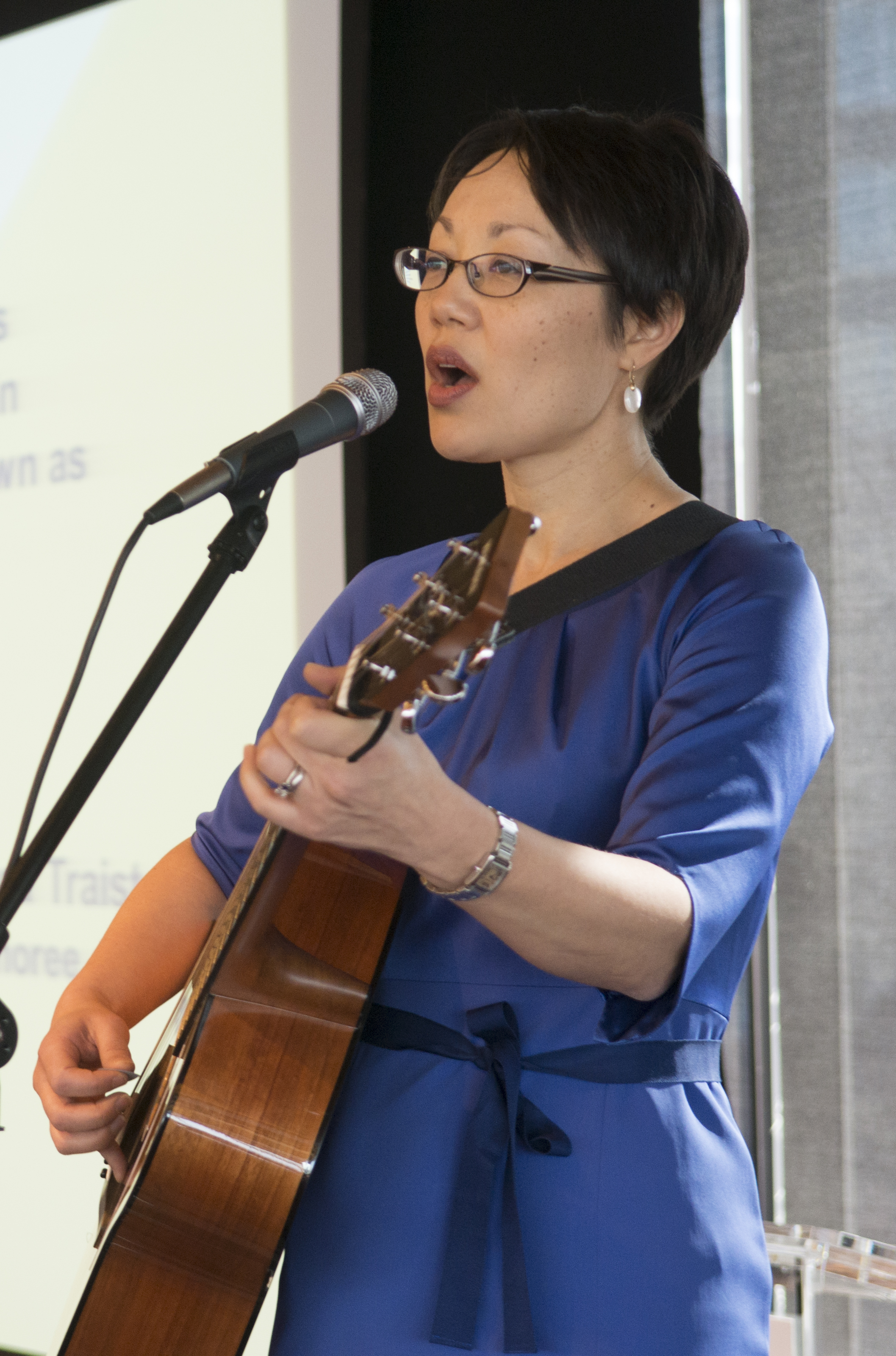
Rabbi Angela Warnick Buchdahl

- Carole B. Balin, M.A. Hebrew letters, 1989; rabbinic ordination, 1991
- Herbert Baumgard, rabbi, M.H.L and Rabbi, 1950, D.H.L. 1962, D.D. 1975
- Henry Berkowitz, rabbi, D.D., 1887
- Israel Bettan, rabbi
- Joshua Bloch, rabbi and librarian
- Reeve Robert Brenner, rabbi, inventor, and author
- Barnett R. Brickner, rabbi
- Angela Warnick Buchdahl (born 1972), first Asian-American to be ordained as a rabbi, and first Asian-American to be ordained as a hazzan (cantor) in the world
- Rachel Cowan, first female rabbi who had converted to Judaism, ordained 1989
- Abraham Cronbach, rabbi and teacher
- Maurice Davis, rabbi and activist
- Abraham J. Feldman (1893–1977), rabbi
- Morris M. Feuerlicht, rabbi
- William S. Friedman, rabbi
- Samuel H. Goldenson, rabbi
- Moses J. Gries, rabbi
- Louis Grossmann, rabbi and HUC professor
- Hugo Gryn, British rabbi and BBC radio broadcaster
- Adolf Guttmacher, rabbi
- James G. Heller, rabbi and composer
- Maximilian Heller, rabbi
- Ammiel Hirsch, rabbi, lawyer, and former executive director of the Association of Reform Zionists of America/World Union for Progressive Judaism, North America
- Delphine Horvilleur, public intellectual, author, and one of the first female rabbis in France
- Rabbi Richard J. Israel, rabbi, educator, civil rights activist, and author
- Richard Jacobs (rabbi), rabbi, president of the Union for Reform Judaism
- Gilad Kariv, first Reform rabbi to be elected to the Israeli Knesset, executive director of the Israel Movement for Reform and Progressive Judaism
- Joseph Krauskopf, founder of the National Farm School (now Delaware Valley University)
- Elliot Kukla, came out as transgender six months before his ordination in 2006, and was the first openly transgender person to be ordained by HUC-JIR
- Ruth Langer, Professor of Theology at Boston College
- Emil W. Leipziger, rabbi
- Charles S. Levi, rabbi
- Helen Levinthal, first American woman to complete the entire course of study in a rabbinical school
- Clifton H. Levy, rabbi
- Felix A. Levy, rabbi
- Jack P. Lewis, professor in Harding School of Theology (Enrollment in Hebrew Union College is open to non-Jews.)
- Alexander Lyons, rabbi
- Judah Leon Magnes, rabbi, Chancellor/President of the Hebrew University of Jerusalem, 1925–1948
- Jennie Mannheimer, speech and drama teacher, elocutionist
- Jacqueline Mates-Muchin, first Chinese-American rabbi in the world
- Martin A. Meyer, rabbi
- Julian Morgenstern, rabbi, HUC professor, and HUC president
- Shoshana Nambi, first Ugandan female rabbinic student at HUC-JIR, first female rabbi from Uganda
- Morris Newfield, rabbi
- Sally Priesand, America's first female rabbi ordained by a rabbinical seminary, and the second formally ordained female rabbi in Jewish history, after Regina Jonas
- Aaron D. Panken, 12th president of HUC-JIR, 2014–2018
- Jacob S. Raisin, rabbi
- Max Raisin, rabbi
- Abraham B. Rhine (1877–1941), rabbi
- Michael Robinson, rabbi and civil rights activist
- Jonathan Rosenbaum, scholar
- A. James Rudin, rabbi
- Norbert M. Samuelson, professor of Jewish philosophy at Arizona State University
- Tobias Schanfarber, rabbi
- Julie Schwartz, who was ordained by HUC-JIR and later founded HUC-JIR's course of study in pastoral counseling for rabbinical students
- Seymour Schwartzman, opera singer and cantor
- Abram Simon, rabbi
- Alysa Stanton, world's first black female rabbi
- Lance J. Sussman, scholar
- Joseph Stolz, rabbi
- Moses Cyrus Weiler, rabbi and founder of Reform Judaism in South Africa
- Amy Weiss, American Reform rabbi, and non-profit founder
- Louis Wolsey, rabbi
- Eric Yoffie, rabbi, president of the Union for Reform Judaism
- Rabbi Dr. Walter Zanger, tour guide and television personality
- Isaiah Zeldin (1920–2018), rabbi
- Reuben Zellman, first openly transgender person accepted to HUC-JIR in 2003; he was ordained by HUC-JIR in 2010
- George Zepin (1878–1963), rabbi
- Martin Zielonka, rabbi

== See also ==
- List of Jewish universities and colleges in the United States
- Reform Judaism
