= Gerald Bubis =

Canadian-American scholar and academic (1924 - 2015)

Gerald B. Bubis
- Born: June 7, 1924; Winnipeg, Manitoba, Canada
- Died: August 21, 2015 (aged 91); Los Angeles, California, U.S.
- Education: University of Minnesota (B.A., Master of Social Work)
- Occupation: Academic · Author · Jewish communal service pioneer · Peace activist
- Years active: 1940s–1989
- Employer: Hebrew Union College‑Jewish Institute of Religion
- Known for: Influencing the field of Jewish communal service; early advocate for a two‑state solution
- Notable work: The Director Had a Heart Attack and the President Resigned; Growing Jews; Guide Yourself Accordingly: A Memoir
- Title: Founding Director, School of Jewish Communal Service (HUC‑JIR)
- Spouse: Ruby Bubis (m. ~1948; until his death)
- Children: Two (David and Deena)
- Awards: Yitzhak Rabin Peace Award (2003); Honorary doctorates from HUC‑JIR and University of Minnesota

Gerald B. Bubis (June 7, 1924 – August 21, 2015) was a Canadian-American academic, author, and advocate for peace in the Israeli-Palestinian conflict. A professor at the Hebrew Union College-Jewish Institute of Religion (HUC-JIR), he was the founding director of its School of Jewish Communal Service (now the Zelikow School of Jewish Nonprofit Management). Bubis was a leader in Jewish communal service and an early advocate of a two-state solution to the Israeli-Palestinian conflict.

== Early life and education ==
Born in Winnipeg, Canada, in 1924, Bubis grew up in Minneapolis, Minnesota, after moving there at the age of eleven with his sister and mother, who was divorced. His father had abandoned the family due to legal troubles.

Bubis enlisted in the United States Army in 1943, where he trained as a combat engineer, specializing in removing land mines. However, just before his unit was deployed overseas, he was reassigned to train new recruits. He later learned that his original unit was killed in action on the Italian front.

Following his military service, Bubis earned a Bachelor's degree and a Master of Social Work, both from the University of Minnesota.

== Career ==
His first position after college was with Hillel at the University of Minnesota, and then he went on to work at Jewish Community Centers in various cities including Minneapolis, Oakland, and Long Beach. In 1968, at the invitation of the Hebrew Union College-Jewish Institute of Religion (HUC-JIR), Bubis founded the School of Jewish Communal Service on the Los Angeles campus. The school trained professionals for leadership positions in Jewish communal organizations. The program was eventually renamed the Zelikow School of Jewish Nonprofit Management. Bubis led the school until his retirement in 1989, at which time he was appointed as the Alfred Gottschalk Professor Emeritus of Jewish Communal Studies.

Bubis wrote approximately 170 academic papers and 14 books, including Growing Jews and The Director Had a Heart Attack and the President Resigned: Board-Staff Relations for the 21st Century. His work often addressed topics like Jewish identity, nonprofit governance, and Israel-Diaspora relations.

In 2002, Bubis published a study on the cost of Jewish religious and communal participation. He was frequently interviewed by the media on subjects including ethical wills, crises in the Middle East, philanthropy in the Jewish community, same-sex marriage, power dynamics and influence among American Jewish leaders, and immigration to Israel. He also authored op-ed pieces in newspapers such as the Washington Post and the Los Angeles Times.

In the 1980s, Bubis advocated a two-state solution to the Israeli-Palestinian conflict, when the position remained controversial within parts of the American Jewish community. He was the national co-chair of Americans for Peace Now and held leadership roles in numerous Jewish organizations, including the Los Angeles Jewish Federation, MAZON: A Jewish Response to Hunger, and the New Israel Fund.

Bubis also worked as a lecturer and consultant in the United States and abroad. His work was recognized with numerous awards, including the Yitzhak Rabin Peace Award in 2003 and honorary doctorates from HUC-JIR and the University of Minnesota. He also served as the president of the Conference of Jewish Communal Services, a professional association for Jewish social workers and community leaders.

== Personal life and death ==
Gerald Bubis was married to Ruby Bubis, a former Jewish communal worker, for nearly 67 years. They had two children, David and Deena, and several grandchildren, including Rabbi Jonathan Bubis.

Bubis visited Israel more than 50 times and was involved with the Jewish Agency for Israel, the Jerusalem Center for Public Affairs, and the Labor Zionist Alliance.

Bubis died on August 21, 2015, at his home in Los Angeles after a series of illnesses. He was 91.

== Publications ==
- Serving the Jewish family, Ktav Publishing House, 1977.
- Synagogue Havurot: A Comparative Study, Center for Jewish Community Studies, 1983.
- Saving the Jewish Family, University Press of America, 1987.
- Serving the Jewish Polity: The Application of Jewish Political Theory to Jewish Communal Practice, Center for Jewish Community Studies, 1997.
- The Director had a Heart Attack and the President Resigned: Board-Staff Relations for the 21st Century, Jerusalem Center for Public Affairs, 1999.
- Growing Jews, Hebrew Union College Press, 2001.
- Guide Yourself Accordingly: A Memoir, 2005.
- From Predictability to Chaos? How Jewish Leaders Reinvented Their National Communal System, Center for Jewish Community Studies, 2005. (co-authored with Steven Windmueller
