= Cronbach =

Cronbach can refer to:

- Abraham Cronbach (1882–1965), American Rabbi, teacher and known pacifist
- Lee Cronbach (1916–2001), American educational psychologist
  - Cronbach's alpha, a coefficient of reliability developed by Lee Cronbach
