= Maurice Davis =

American Jewish rabbi and activist (1921-1993)

Personal life
- Born: December 15, 1921 Providence, Rhode Island, United States
- Died: December 14, 1993 (aged 71) Palm Coast, Florida, United States
- Spouse: Marion Cronbach
- Children: 2 children, 6 grandchildren
- Parent(s): Jack and Sadie Davis
- Education: Brown University; University of Cincinnati; Hebrew Union College

Religious life
- Religion: Judaism
- Denomination: Reform
- Profession: Rabbi

Maurice Davis (December 15, 1921 – December 14, 1993) was a rabbi and activist. He served on the President's Commission on Equal Opportunity, in the Lyndon B. Johnson Administration and was a director of the American Family Foundation, now known as the International Cultic Studies Association. Davis was the rabbi of the Jewish Community Center of White Plains, New York, and a regular contributor to The Jewish Post and Opinion.

== Personal and family life ==
Rabbi Davis married Marion Cronbach, daughter of Rose Hentil and prominent reform rabbi and well-known pacifist (and Davis's teacher) Abraham Cronbach. Davis and his wife had two children, both of whom went on to become rabbis.

== Civil rights work ==
The 3rd Selma Civil Rights March frontline

In 1952, Davis founded the Kentucky Committee on Desegregation. In 1965, he walked with Martin Luther King Jr. in Alabama, on the third of the Selma to Montgomery marches, and was appointed to the Equal Employment Opportunity Commission by President Johnson.

== Anti-cult activity and opposition to the Unification Church ==
In 1970, when two of his congregants' children joined the Unification Church of the United States, Davis educated himself about the nature and methods of groups he considered to be cults. He assisted the parents of "cult children". Davis directed and appeared in the film, You Can Go Home Again, produced by the Union of American Hebrew Congregations. Davis reported that he observed commonalities among the young people he counseled who had joined the Unification Church. He found that most of them were dropouts from mainline churches or synagogues – and that they were on a quest for idealism, community and a sense of belonging.

In 1972, Davis founded the group Citizens Engaged in Reuniting Families (CERF), a national anti-Unification Church organization, which by 1976 was comprised 500 families. In November 1976, Rabbi Davis spoke at Temple Israel of Northern Westchester, New York, on "The Moon People And Our Children". He compared the Unification Church to the Hitler Youth and the Peoples Temple.

== Activism for Judaism ==
In 1990, Davis criticized people who refer to themselves as Jews for Jesus, Hebrew Christians or Messianic Jews as being "devious" and "deceptive". He further stated that people who accept Jesus as the Messiah are, by definition, Christians and not Jewish.

== Works ==
- You Can Go Home Again, film director, produced by Union of American Hebrew Congregations.

== See also ==
- Anti-cult movement
- Mind control
- Unification Church and Judaism
- Unification Church of the United States
