= God in Search of Man =

Book by Abraham Joshua Heschel

God in Search of Man: A Philosophy of Judaism
- First edition
- Author: Abraham Joshua Heschel
- Subject: Religion, philosophy
- Genre: Non-fiction
- Published: Jewish Publication Society (1955)
- Media type: Print
- Pages: 437
- ISBN: 978-0374513313

God in Search of Man: A Philosophy of Judaism is a work on Jewish philosophy by Rabbi Dr. Abraham Joshua Heschel. Heschel saw the work's title as a paradoxical formula, rooted in the rabbinic tradition, summarizing human history as seen in the Bible: God in search of man.

In God in Search of Man Heschel articulates a belief in a personal God who sees humankind as partners in creation, forging a world filled with justice and compassion.

God in Search of Man: A Philosophy of Judaism is a companion volume to Heschel's earlier work Man Is Not Alone: A Philosophy of Religion where he delineates experiential and philosophical interpretations of Jewish views of humanity and the world, while in God in Search of Man Heschel focuses particularly on Jewish revelation and orthopraxis.

== Contents ==
In God in Search of Man, Heschel discusses the nature of religious thought, how thought becomes faith, and how faith creates responses in the believer. He discusses ways that people can seek God's presence, and the "radical amazement" that we receive in return. He offers a criticism of nature worship; a study of humanity's metaphysical loneliness, and his view that we can consider God to be in search of humanity.

Heschel, like his teacher Martin Buber, stresses the personal relationship between God and mankind, defined by Heschel as the Godly pathos and mankind's radical amazement.

=== Main topics ===
The first section concludes with a study of Jews as a chosen people. Section two deals with the idea of revelation, and what it means for one to be a prophet. This section gives us Heschel's idea of revelation as an event, as opposed to a process. This relates to Israel's commitment to God. Section three discusses his views of how a Jew should understand the nature of Judaism as a religion.

=== Faith and law ===
Heschel discusses and rejects the idea that mere faith (without law) alone is enough, but then cautions against rabbis he sees as adding too many restrictions to Jewish law. He discusses the need to correlate ritual observance with spirituality and love, the importance of Kavanah (intention) when performing mitzvot. He engages in a discussion of religious behaviorism—when people strive for external compliance with the law, yet disregard the importance of inner devotion.

== See also ==
- Abraham Joshua Heschel
- Jewish philosophy
