= Martin Zielonka =

American rabbi of German descent (1877–1938)

- Born: February 15, 1877; Berlin, German Empire
- Died: January 1, 1938 (aged 60); El Paso, Texas, United States
- Education: University of Cincinnati (AB); Hebrew Union College
- Occupation: Rabbi
- Known for: Rabbi of Temple Mount Sinai; research on Mexican Jewry
- Spouse: Dora Schatzky (m. 1901)
- Children: David Leopold

Martin Zielonka (February 15, 1877 – January 1, 1938) was a German-born American rabbi.

== Early life and education ==
Zielonka was born on February 15, 1877, in Berlin, Germany, the son of David Zielonka and Bertha Sanger. Zielonka came to America with his parents when he was three and attended school in Cincinnati, Ohio. He graduated from the University of Cincinnati with an A.B. in 1899. He also finished an eight-year course and graduated from Hebrew Union College that year, and his class there was the last to be ordained rabbis by Isaac Mayer Wise.

== Career ==
He served as rabbi of Congregation Rodef Sholom of Waco, Texas, from 1899 to 1900. He then became rabbi of Temple Mount Sinai in El Paso in 1900, serving as rabbi there until his death in 1938. He helped organize the El Paso Health League in 1905, the Memorial Park in 1920, and the College of the City of El Paso in 1915. He served as a director of the latter until 1920. In 1921, he organized and became chairman of B'nai B'rith work in Mexico. From 1922 to 1927, he was a chairman, with the rank of major, of the United States Officers Reserve Corps. He was also an executive committee member of the Central Conference of American Rabbis, and served as president of the Hebrew Union College Alumni Association from 1929 to 1931.

Zielonka founded the Junior College, which later merged with the School of Mines, and the Associated Charities. He served a term as president of the B'nai B'rith Seventh District. In 1927, he was elected rabbi for life at Temple Mount Sinai. He researched the history of Mexican Jewry, published his research in the Publications of the American Jewish Historical Society, read a paper on the economic, cultural, and religious life of Mexican Jews before the Central Conference of American Rabbis in 1927, and possessed a library of Mexicana and histories of South American Inquisition, which his heirs donated to the American Jewish Historical Society upon his death.

== Board memberships ==
Zielonka was a member of the Central Conference of American Rabbis, the American Jewish Historical Society, the Jewish Research Society, the Freemasons, and the Rotary Club.

== Personal life ==
In 1901, he married Dora Schatzky. Their son was Rabbi David Leopold, who served as rabbi of Temple Beth El of Corsicana, Texas, and of Congregation Schaarai Zedek in Tampa, Florida. Zielonka gave the baccalaureate sermon when David was ordained at Hebrew Union College in 1929.

== Death ==
Zielonka died in Providence Hospital on January 1, 1938. A large crowd of different religions and races attended his funeral at Temple Mount Sinai, including Bishop of El Paso Anthony Joseph Schuler. Rabbi Edgar Magnin of Los Angeles prayed at the funeral and assistant rector of St. Clement's Episcopal Church Rev. B. M. G. Williams delivered the eulogy. 83 cars followed the hearse with Zielonka's body to Mt. Sinai Cemetery, where he was buried. An additional 19 cars were already at the cemetery, bringing the total to nearly 400 people attending the burial.
