= Amy Weiss =

American rabbi

Amy Weiss is an American Reform rabbi, and the founder and executive director of the Houston-based non-profit Undies for Everyone (UFE).

Weiss got the idea for UFE in 2008 when a social worker expressed to her the need that disadvantaged youth had for underwear. A blogger for the Houston Chronicle at the time, Weiss wrote a post calling for underwear donations and founded UFE due to the overwhelming reader response. UFE became a nonprofit organization in 2012.

Weiss attended the Rice University Leadership Institute for Non-Profit Executives while serving as resident chef for Houston Hillel. she was chair of a panel of the Houston Police Independent Oversight Board. She also served as a member of the TIRR Memorial Hermann ethics committee.

Weiss was named a CNN Hero in June 2022. She is married to Rabbi Kenny Weiss, executive director of Houston Hillel.

== Education ==
Weiss grew up in Dallas, Texas and graduated from the University of Texas with a Bachelor of Science in 1983. She received a Master of Arts from the Hebrew Union College-Jewish Institute of Religion in 1991, a Master of Arts in Hebrew Literature from HUC-JIR in 1994, and was ordained at HUC-JIR in 1995.
