= Moses Buttenweiser =

Moses Buttenwieser (April 5, 1862 in Beerfelden – March 11 or 12, 1939 in Palo Alto) was an American Bible scholar, educated at the universities of University of Würzburg, Leipzig, and Heidelberg, where he received his Ph.D. in 1897.

Being Jewish, he concentrated on the Old Testament. In 1897 he became professor of Biblical exegesis in the Hebrew Union College of Cincinnati, Ohio. His works include The Hebrew Elias-Apocalypse, in German (1897); An Outline of Neo-Hebraic Apocalyptic Literature (1901); The Prophets of Israel (1914); The Book of Job (1922); and numerous articles in learned publications.

== Works ==
- Die hebräische Elias-Apokalypse, und ihre Stellung in der apokalyptischen Litteratur des rabbinischen Schrifttums und der Kirche. Part 1: Kritische Ausgabe mit Erläuterungen, sprachlichen Untersuchungen, und einer Einleitung, nebst Übersetzung und Untersuchung der Abfassungszeit (= Heidelberg, PhD thesis, 1897), Leipzig: Pfeiffer, 1897.
- The Psalms. Chronologically treated with a new translation, Chicago: Univ. of Chicago Pr., 1938.
