= Sarah Bunin Benor =

American linguist

- Awards: National Jewish Book Award in Education and Jewish Identity (2020); Sami Rohr Choice Award for Jewish Literature (2019)

Academic background
- Education: Columbia University (BA); Stanford University (PhD)

Academic work
- Discipline: sociolinguistics; Jewish studies
- Institutions: Hebrew Union College – Jewish Institute of Religion

Sarah Bunin Benor is an American linguist and scholar of Jewish languages. She is a professor of contemporary Jewish studies and linguistics and vice provost of Hebrew Union College – Jewish Institute of Religion.

== Biography ==
Benor graduated from Charles E. Smith Jewish Day School in North Bethesda, Maryland. She received her B.A. from Columbia University in comparative literature in 1997 and Ph.D. from Stanford University in linguistics in 2004. While working at the Columbia University Libraries as a college student, she stumbled across references to rare languages such as Judeo-Italian and Judaeo-Spanish, which led to her interest in studying linguistics, especially Jewish languages. Her research has focused on Jewish languages, Yiddish, and American Jews. She directs the Jewish Language Project at Hebrew Union College, which runs the Jewish Language Website and the Jewish English Lexicon.

Benor is author of Becoming Frum: How Newcomers Learn the Language and Culture of Orthodox Judaism (2012), which won the 2013 Sami Rohr Choice Award for Jewish Literature. In 2021, she received a National Jewish Book Award in Education and Jewish Identity for her book Hebrew Infusion (2020), a book on language infusion at Jewish summer camps co-authored with Jonathan Krasner and Sharon Avni.

Benor is an Ashkenazi Jew.

== See also ==
- Deborah Lifchitz
- Kalmi Baruh
