= Alvin J. Reines =

Alvin J. Reines (1926–2004) was an American Reform rabbi, philosopher and theologian. He was professor of Philosophy and Theology at Hebrew Union College.

He is known for his pluralistic religious philosophy and theology of polydoxy. Polydoxy emphasizes individual autonomy and religious freedom. For Reines religious believers should be free to choose which beliefs and practices they adopt whilst respecting the right of other religious believer to do the same. Rather than there being one correct conception of God there are many.

Reines personally conceives of God as "'the enduring possibility of being," explained as "the permanent ongoing potentiality from which the universe is continually being realized," calling this position Hylotheism.

Polydoxy is presented as the opposite of orthodoxy. A religion can be polydox or an orthodox. Reines calls for a 'polydox' approach to Judaism and religion in general.

In 1972 his students founded the Institute of Creative Judaism (ICJ) which changed its name to the Polydox Institute.

== Works ==
- Halachah and Reform Judaism. With Trude Weiss-Rosmarin and Richard L. Rubenstein (Union of American Hebrew Congregations, 1970)
- Polydoxy: Explorations in a Philosophy of Religion, (Prometheus Books, 1987)
- Maimonides and Abrabanel on Prophecy, (Hebrew Union College Press, 1970)
- "Hylotheism: The Enduring Possibility of Being and Process Theology". In Jewish Theology and Process Thought, eds. Sandra B. Lubarsky and David R. Griffin (State University of New York Press, 1996), 255–87.
