= Undies for Everyone =

Texas nonprofit organization

Undies for Everyone (UFE) is a Texas-based charitable nonprofit organization that provides new underwear for children in need and victims of natural disasters.

== Charitable work ==
UFE was founded in 2012 by Rabbi Amy Weiss in response to the need for new underwear among vulnerable populations.

Rabbi Weiss began UFE by providing free underwear to students in the Houston Independent School District.

In 2017, Rabbi Weiss and her husband lost their home during Hurricane Harvey. She collected underwear for those affected by the Hurricane and distributed them out of her husband's office. Her neighbor, Brené Brown, posted a video about UFE which resulted in the donation on 1.5 million pairs of underwear.

As of 2022, UFE has given away nearly 2 million pairs of underwear in 17 cities.

Rabbi Weiss was named a CNN Hero in June 2022 for her work with UFE.
