= Julie Schwartz (rabbi) =

American rabbi (born 1986)

Personal life
- Born: Cincinnati

Religious life
- Religion: Judaism
- Position: Rabbi
- Organisation: B'nai Israel
- Began: 1999

Julie Schwartz is an American rabbi. She was born in Cincinnati and, in 1986, she became the first woman to serve as an active-duty Jewish chaplain in the U.S. Navy, the same year she was ordained by the Hebrew Union College-Jewish Institute of Religion. She counseled patients at the naval hospital in Oakland, California, and after a three-year tour of duty she returned to Cincinnati and held assorted jobs at HUC-JIR.

In 1999, she became the first rabbi of B'nai Israel, the south side's first Jewish congregation in Fayette County, Georgia; they had previously been served by rabbinical students.

In 2011, she returned to HUC-JIR to head the pastoral care and counseling program she founded.

The 2022 art exhibit “Holy Sparks”, shown among other places at the Dr. Bernard Heller Museum, featured art about twenty-four female rabbis who were firsts in some way; Emily Bowen Cohen created the artwork about Schwartz that was in that exhibit.
