= David Ellenson =

American rabbi and academic administrator (1947–2023)

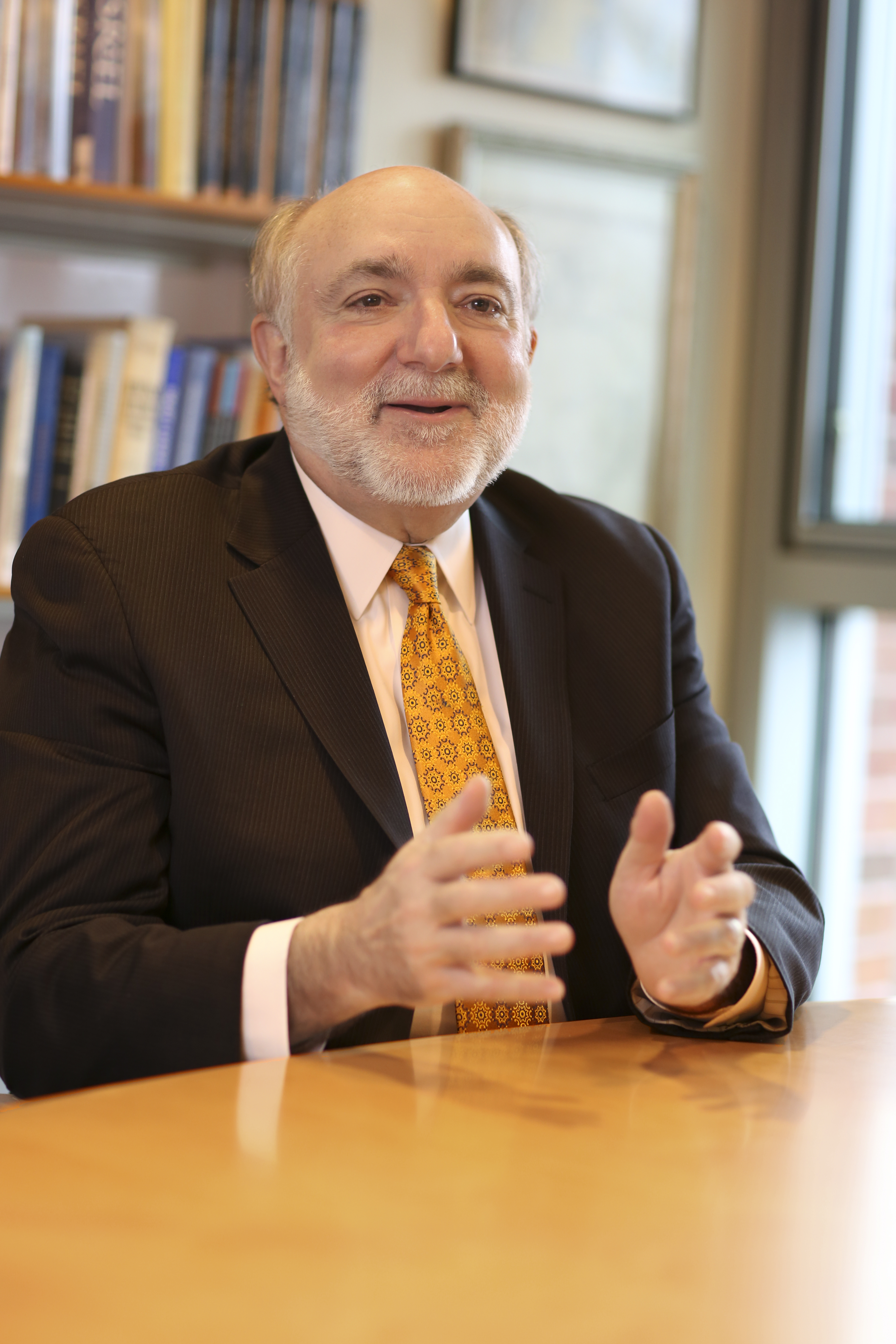
- Ellenson in 2016

8th President of Hebrew Union College - Jewish Institute of Religion
- In office May 5, 2018 – April 2019; Interim
- Preceded by: Aaron D. Panken
- Succeeded by: Andrew Rehfeld
- In office 2001 – December 31, 2013
- Preceded by: Sheldon Zimmerman
- Succeeded by: Aaron D. Panken

Personal details
- Born: 25 June 1947 Brookline, Massachusetts, U.S.
- Died: December 7, 2023 (aged 76) Manhattan, New York City
- Education: College of William & Mary (BA); University of Virginia (MA); Columbia University (PhD)

David Ellenson (June 25, 1947 – December 7, 2023) was an American rabbi and academic who was known as a leader of the Reform movement in Judaism. Ellenson was director of the Schusterman Center for Israel Studies and visiting professor of Near Eastern and Judaic studies at Brandeis University and previously president of the Hebrew Union College-Jewish Institute of Religion (HUC-JIR). He previously served as president of HUC-JIR from 2001 to December 31, 2013, and was later chancellor emeritus of that college until his death. Ellenson had served as interim president following the death of his successor, Aaron D. Panken until the inauguration of Andrew Rehfeld, the 10th and current President.

== Early life and education ==
Ellenson was born on June 25, 1947, in Brookline, Massachusetts, and grew up in an Orthodox Jewish family in Newport News, Virginia. He was president of the student body at Newport News High School in 1964–65.

Ellenson graduated from the College of William and Mary with a B.A. in 1969. In 1972, he earned a M.A. in religious studies from the University of Virginia. He was then ordained at HUC-JIR in 1977 and received his Ph.D. from Columbia University in 1981.

== Career ==
Ellenson was first appointed a member of the faculty in Jewish Religious Thought at Hebrew Union College in 1979. For two decades, Ellenson served as head of the Louchheim School of Judaic Studies, the undergraduate program in Jewish studies at the University of Southern California conducted under the aegis of HUC-JIR. In 1988, Ellenson was appointed the I.H. and Anna Grancell Professor of Jewish Religious Thought at HUC-JIR. He also served as a visiting professor at both UCLA and the Jewish Theological Seminary of America, and in 1997–1998 he was a Lady Davis Visiting Professor of the Humanities in the Department of Jewish Thought at Hebrew University. He was a fellow of the Shalom Hartman Institute of Jerusalem, a fellow and lecturer at the Institute of Advanced Studies at Hebrew University in Jerusalem, and a teacher at the Pardes Institute of Jewish Studies in Jerusalem. In 2015, Ellenson was appointed a distinguished visiting professor at New York University and he taught there in the Skirball Department of Judaic Studies in 2015–2016.

A scholar of modern Jewish thought and history, Ellenson was recognized for his writings and publications in these fields. He has written extensively on the origins and development of Orthodox Judaism in Germany during the nineteenth century, Orthodox legal writings on conversion in Israel, North America, and Europe during the modern era, the relationship between religion and state in Israel, the history of modern Jewish religious movements, and American Jewish life.

Ellenson authored or edited seven books and over 300 articles and reviews in a wide variety of academic and popular journals and newspapers.

Ellenson was inaugurated as HUC's eighth president in October 2002, succeeding Rabbi Sheldon Zimmerman. Upon his retirement and assumption of the role of HUC-JIR's first chancellor, he was succeeded as president by Rabbi Aaron Panken.

David Ellenson and his daughter Ruth Andrew Ellenson, editor of The Modern Jewish Girl's Guide to Guilt, both won the National Jewish Book Award in 2006, the only father and daughter to do so in the same year since Abraham Joshua Heschel and Susannah Heschel.

President George W. Bush appointed Ellenson to serve on delegation to accompany him to Jerusalem for the celebration of the 60th anniversary of the State of Israel in May 2008.

In 2009 Newsweek named him # 5 on its list of "50 Influential Rabbis."

== Death ==
Ellenson died on December 7, 2023, at the age of 76.

== Books ==
- Jewish Meaning in a World of Choice: Studies in Tradition and Modernity. The Jewish Publication Society, 2014
- Pledges of Jewish Allegiance, co-authored with Daniel Gordis. Stanford University Press, 2012. Nominated for National Jewish Book Award.
- After Emancipation: Jewish Religious Responses to Modernity. HUC-Press, 2004. Winner of National Jewish Book Award 2006.
- Between Tradition and Culture: The Dialectics of Jewish Religion and Identity in the Modern World. Scholar's Press, 1994.
- Bits of Honey: Essays for Samson H. Levey, co-edited with Stanley Chyet. Scholar's Press, 1993.
- Rabbi Esriel Hildesheimer and the Creation of a Modern Jewish Orthodoxy. University of Alabama Press, 1990. Nominated for National Jewish Book Award.
- Tradition in Transition: Orthodoxy. Halakhah and the Boundaries of Modern Jewish Identity. University Press of America. 1989.
