= Sheldon Zimmerman =

Canadian rabbi (born 1942-July 14, 2026)

7th President of Hebrew Union College - Jewish Institute of Religion
- In office 1996–2000
- Preceded by: Alfred Gottschalk
- Succeeded by: David Ellenson

Personal details
- Born: 1942 Toronto, Ontario, Canada
- Died: July 14, 2026 (aged 84) Texas, United States
- Education: University of Toronto

Rabbi Sheldon Zimmerman (1942-July 14, 2026) is a former rabbinic leader in Reform Judaism. He is a past president of the Central Conference of American Rabbis (CCAR) and Hebrew Union College-Jewish Institute of Religion. In 2000, Zimmerman was suspended from the CCAR after an inquiry regarding inappropriate sexual conduct revealed a pattern of predatory behavior, including fondling and kissing a teenager. He subsequently resigned as the 7th president of HUC-JIR which he had led from 1996–2000.

== Background and career ==
Rabbi Zimmerman was born in Toronto, Ontario and attended the University of Toronto. He was ordained from HUC's New York Campus in 1970 and is the 11th generation of rabbis in his family. His son, Rabbi Brian Zimmerman, currently the regional director for the Union for Reform Judaism's Southwest region, is the 12th. His other son Coach David Zimmerman is currently the Athletic Director and Varsity Boys Basketball coach at Yavneh Academy of Dallas.

Zimmerman served as the senior rabbi of Central Synagogue in New York City from 1972–1985 and Temple Emanu-El in Dallas, Texas. He then served as the 7th president of HUC-JIR from 1996-2000 until his resignation after the allegations that were made against him.

After leaving HUC, Zimmerman worked as executive vice president of the popular Birthright Israel program. In 2003, United Jewish Communities (UJC) hired Zimmerman as vice president of Jewish Renaissance and Renewal.

In 2012, Sheldon's book The New Family Prayerbook was published.

He served as the rabbi of the Jewish Center of the Hamptons for nearly 10 years, until his retirement in the summer of 2017.

Zimmernman then served as scholar-in-residence at Temple Emanu-El in Dallas from 2017 until his firing in 2021.

== Misconduct ==
Zimmerman was suspended by the Central Conference of American Rabbis (CCAR) in 2000 after what was described as inappropriate “personal relationships” that violated ethical codes. Shortly after this, he resigned as president of the HUC-JIR, the Reform movement's seminary.

The CCAR later reinstated Zimmerman's credentials in 2005.

In 2020, a former congregant of Zimmerman (at Central Synagogue, where Zimmerman had served as senior rabbi from 1972-1985) reported that she had also been subjected to predatory sexual behavior during his time in the congregation. This led to a new investigation being conducted, which led to additional reports of sexually predatory behavior by Zimmerman.

In the aftermath of the announcement from Central Synagogue, Temple Emanu-El of Dallas fired Zimmerman from his position with the congregation in May 2021. The CCAR and HUC both stated in early 2021 that they are continuing to investigate the allegations.

On November 3, 2021, Hebrew Union College published a report of an investigation made regarding past reports of sexual misconduct at HUC, which included three accounts of such conduct by Zimmerman.
