= Herbert Baumgard =

American Rabbi (1920–2016)

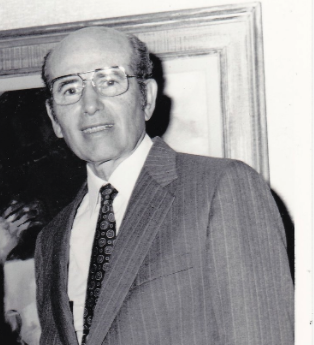
- Born: Herbert Mark Baumgard; August 3, 1920; Norfolk, Virginia
- Died: April 15, 2016 (aged 95); Norfolk, Virginia
- Occupations: Rabbi, Author
- Spouse: Selma Geller

Herbert Mark Baumgard (August 3, 1920 – April 15, 2016) was the founding Rabbi of Temple Beth Am, and was one of the leading interpreters of Liberal Judaism. "The Rabbi Herbert Baumgard Learning Hub" in the Green Library at Florida International University and "Rabbi Baumgard Road," which runs in front of the temple which he founded, were named after him after his death.

== Early life ==
Baumgard was born in Norfolk, Virginia to Sarah and Samuel, who was a tailor. He graduated from the University of Virginia's McIntire School of Commerce in 1941 where he was a member of Hillel and Alpha Epsilon Pi fraternity. Next he attended Columbia Law School, where he was captain of the debate team. It was during World War II, while serving as a chaplain's assistant, that Baumgard realized he wanted to become a rabbi.

== Career ==
He was ordained at Hebrew Union College-Jewish Institute of Religion in 1950 and earned his doctorate in Hebrew Letters in 1956. Baumgard began his rabbinical career at Temple B'nai Israel in Elmont, New York.

In 1955, he moved with his family to Miami and was the founding rabbi of Temple Beth Am, located in Pinecrest, Florida. Being inspired by Stephen Samuel Wise and Mordecai Kaplan, his idea was to shift Beth Am to a synagogue, while emphasizing education. He served as the head rabbi there for over 30 years. Upon retiring in 1987, he had built it from 55 families meeting at a church to 1,700 families on a 14-acre campus that included a day school and a youth basketball league, becoming the largest Reform congregation in the Southeast.

Rabbi Baumgard's other notable positions of leadership include serving as President of the Synagogue Council of America, the largest Jewish organization including all the branches of Judaism; the President of the Community Relations Board of Miami-Dade County; President of the Alumni Association of the Hebrew Union College Jewish Institute of Religion; and President of the Dialogue Chapter of the National Conference of Christians and Jews. He was among the Jewish leaders to meet with Pope John Paul II during his 1987 visit to Miami.

Specializing in the study of the Hebrew prophets, he was the author of several books, including The Miracles of Jesus and the Miracles of the Early Hebrew Prophets, Loving What is Close, Judaism and Prayer: Issues of Faith, and Finding My Way to God.

== Personal life ==
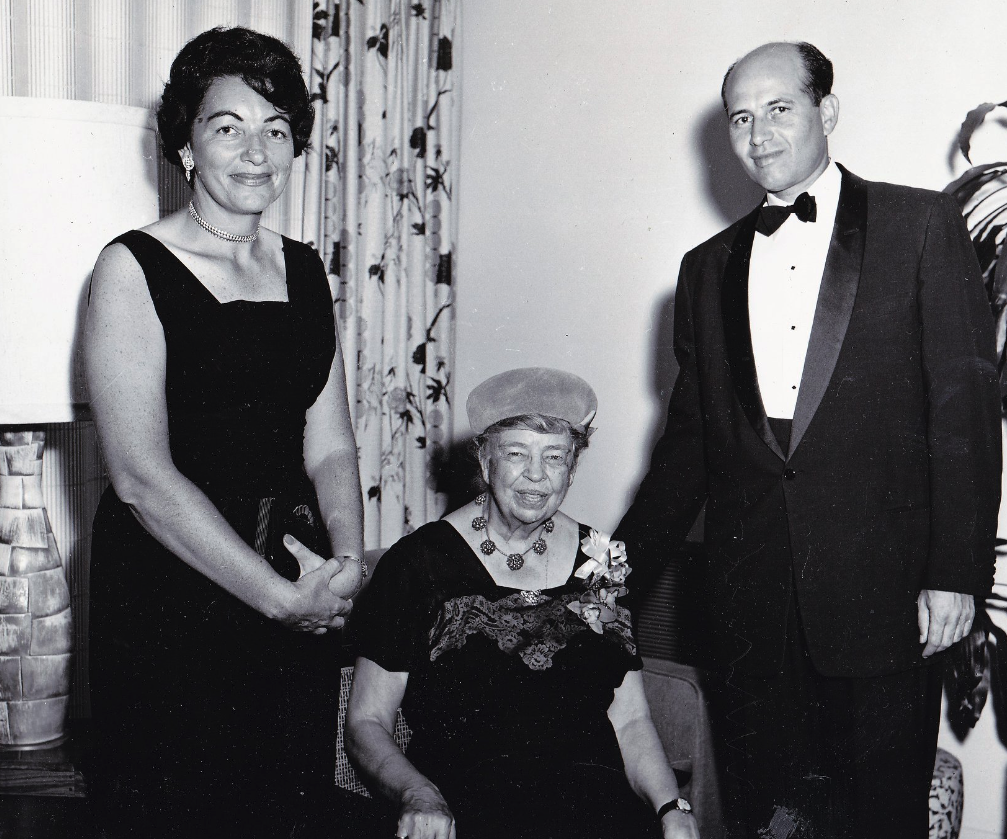
Rabbi Herbert Baumgard (right) with wife Selma (left), and Eleanor Roosevelt (center)

Baumgard married Selma Geller, one of his students at Columbia who would later found the Temple Beth Am choir. They had three children: Jonathan, Daniel and Shira. He died on April 15, 2016, at the age of 95.
