= David Neumark (rabbi) =

Jewish theological philosopher

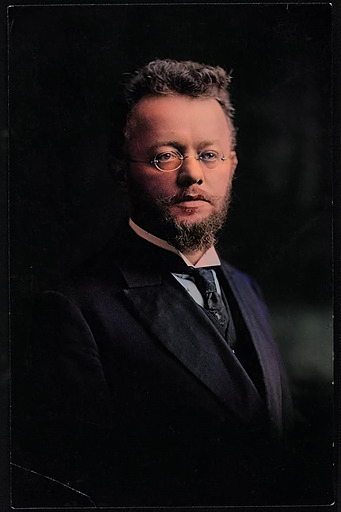
Rabbi Dr David Neumark

David Neumark (1866–1924) was a German-American rabbi and professor of Jewish philosophy. He authored several notable works on Jewish philosophy and Jewish law, and served as a professor at Hebrew Union College in Cincinnati, Ohio.

== Biography ==
Neumark was born in Shchyrets (Szczerzec), Galicia (present day Ukraine) and was married to Mrs Dora Turnheim Neumark (1878-1959). Their children were Salomea (Sally) Brainin, Martha Neumark Montor, and Immanuel K. Neumark.

Neumark's daughter Martha (1904–1981) was a notable early figure in the history of women's ordination as rabbis. Neumark was widely reported to be the first Jewish woman to be accepted into a rabbinical school.

Prior to his move to the United States, Neumark served as the rabbi in Rakovník and received his doctorate from the University of Berlin. In 1907, Hebrew Union College President Kaufmann Kohler appointed Neumark to the college faculty where he became chair of philosophy and served until his death in 1924.

In 1919, Neumark served as the founding editor of a scholarly quarterly Journal of Jewish Lore and Philosophy. The journal was later renamed The Hebrew Union College Annual.

=== Views ===
Neumark viewed that elements mythology and irrationalism were always present within Judaism, and considered that Kabbalah emerged in the twelfth and thirteenth century in response to the cultural and religious atmosphere created by Jewish rationalism. Kabbalah then transformed philosophical terminology into mystical symbols.

Neumark supported the ordination of women as rabbis, and supported his daughter Martha Neumark to study for the rabbinate.

== Family ==
David Neumark married Dora Turnheim and had three children: Salomea, Martha, and Immanuel.

In 1920, Martha Neumark, David Neumark's second child, began studying to become a rabbi but ultimately was denied the possibility of ordination, and withdrew from the program after seven years of study.

David Neumark's youngest child and only son, Immanuel Kant Neumark, was born in 1914, and in the early 1930s, he reportedly received a master's degree in education with a speciality in the German language. In the 1940s, he served as the executive director of American Crusade Against Lynching, an advocacy group combating lynching in the United States, and campaigned for the impeachment of senator Theodore G. Bilbo.

== Selected works ==
- Neumark, D. (1907-1910). Geschichte der Judischen Philosophie des Mittelalters, Berlin: G. Reimer. 2 Vols. (later translated to Hebrew as Toledot ha-Filosofyah be-Yisrael).
- Neumark, D. (1908). Jehuda Hallevi's Philosophy in Its Principles. Cincinnati: Hebrew Union College Press.
- Neumark, D. (1918). The Philosophy of the Bible. Ark Publishing Company.
- Neumark, D. (1929). Essays in Jewish Philosophy. New York: Central Conference of American Rabbis.

== See also ==
- Jacob Zallel Lauterbach
