= Israel Bettan =

Israel Bettan (January 16, 1889 – August 5, 1957) was a Lithuanian-American rabbi and professor.

== Life ==
Bettan was born on January 16, 1889, in Shaty, Kovno Governorate, Russian Empire, the son of Moses Isaac Bettan and Anna Itta Fishman.

Bettan immigrated to America on the SS Potsdam in 1904. He previously studied at the Slabodka Yeshiva, and by 1907 he was studying at the Isaac Elchanan Yeshivah. He then went to the University of Cincinnati, where he graduated with a B.A. in 1910, and Hebrew Union College, where he was ordained a rabbi in 1912 and received a D.D. in 1915. He served as rabbi of Congregation B'nai Israel in Charleston, West Virginia, from 1912 to 1922. While in Charleston, he was chairman of the City Survey Commission from 1915 to 1917 and a member of the Child Welfare Committee of West Virginia from 1921 to 1923. He was a chaplain in the American Expeditionary Forces from 1918 to 1919, during World War I.

Active in Charleston's charitable and social welfare activities, Bettan was also president of the Charleston Federated Charities from 1916 to 1918. In 1922, he became professor of homiletics and Midrash at Hebrew Union College. He wrote a number of monographs and tracts on post-Biblical Judaism for the Union of American Hebrew Congregations' Tract Commission (which he was a member of). He wrote studies on various rabbis' sermons for the Hebrew Union College Annual, including Judah Moscato in 1921, Azariah Figo in 1930, Ephraim Luntshitz in 1932, Jonathan Eybeschutz in 1935, and Jacob Anatoli in 1936. He wrote the article "Early Reform in Contemporaneous Responsa" for the Hebrew Union College Jubilee Volume in 1925 as well as Studies in Jewish Preaching: Middle Ages in 1939, which dealt with early preaching in synagogues.

Bettan also wrote Studies in Jewish Preaching and Opposition to Orthodoxy to Early Reform in 1914 and The Five Scrolls: A Commentary in 1950. He taught at Hebrew Union College for 35 years. Believing in the power of the pulpit, he taught his rabbinic students to use that power to motivate their congregations. Active in the Reform movement, he was twice a member of the committee that revised the Union Prayer Book. He was named president of the Central Conference of American Rabbis in 1956 and retired as professor the next year to focus on his presidency.

Bettan was a member of the American Legion and B'nai B'rith. In 1927, he married Ida Goldstein, daughter of Nisen Goldstein. They had one child, Anita Esther.

Bettan died in Cincinnati on August 5, 1957.
