= Abraham Cronbach =

American rabbi and teacher

Rabbi Abraham Cronbach
- Rabbi Abraham Cronbach
- Born: February 16, 1882; Indianapolis, Indiana, United States
- Died: April 2, 1965; Cincinnati, Ohio, United States
- Occupations: Rabbi and Professor
- Spouse: Rose Hentil
- Children: Marion Cronbach
- Parent(s): Marcus and Hannah (Itzig) Cronbach

Abraham Cronbach (February 15, 1882 – April 2, 1965) was an American rabbi and teacher, known as a pacifist. He served as a rabbi for congregations in Indiana and Ohio. Cronbach was one of the founders of the Peace Heroes Memorial Society.

== Early life and education ==
Abraham Cronbach was born to German immigrants Marcus and Hannah (Itzig) Cronbach. Marcus was a notions store retailer in Indianapolis, Indiana, where Abraham grew up. "Abraham was an introspective boy, with a precocious and mystic conception of both God and the devil (he thought the devil was responsible for the smoke from the manhole in the street)." He grew up in a Christian neighborhood where anti-Semitism and extreme poverty were common. He played violin as a boy as well as read a lot on religion and science. In high school Cronbach decided he would become a rabbi despite his parents' opposition.

Cronbach entered the Hebrew Union College (HUC) in Cincinnati, Ohio in 1898 where, in conjunction with the University of Cincinnati he studied for his bachelor's degree and trained for the rabbinate. He graduated in 1902 from the University of Cincinnati and, in 1906 was valedictorian of his HUC class and was ordained as a rabbi.

On October 7, 1917, Cronbach married Rose Hentel, a teacher at the Free Synagogue in New York City whom he met during his time there. In 1923 the Cronbachs adopted a daughter, Marion. Later Cronbach would become the teacher of rabbinic student, Maurice Davis who would become a leader in the anti-cult movement and Cronbach's son-in-law.

== Early career ==
Rabbi Cronbach Early 1900s

Cronbach first served as rabbi at the reform congregation of Temple Beth El in South Bend, Indiana. In 1911 he spent a year studying at the University of Cambridge in England and the Hochschule fur die Wissenschaft des Judentums in Berlin. In 1915 he received the Doctor of Divinity degree from Hebrew Union College.

After resigning his pulpit in South Bend in 1915 Cronbach spent three years devoting himself to the chaplaincy in prison and hospital installations. He developed strong convictions about the futility of the prison system. He eventually befriended Nathan Leopold. His interest in prisoners never faded and only increased his detestation of revenge and retribution and made Cronbach a strong opponent of capital punishment and the entire prison system.

If Cronbach had the power, he would destroy all jails and prisons, which he regards as instruments of societal vengeance which corrupt both the prisoners and society itself, and he would confine law-breakers to new institutions for psychological treatment and social retraining.

— Albert Vorspan

Cronbach spent the next seven years serving in three different rabbinical capacities: from 1915 and 1917 he worked with the Free Synagogue in New York City; from 1917 through 1919 he served as Rabbi at Temple Israel in Akron, Ohio; and from 1919 through 1922 he served as the institutional chaplain for the Chicago Federation of Synagogues.

== Lecturer and educator ==
In December 1920, Cronbach delivered a series of lectures on chaplaincy procedures at Hebrew Union College ("The Ministry of the Jewish By-Ways." Hebrew Union College Monthly, January - April, 1921). In 1922, Cronbach was appointed a professor of social studies at Hebrew Union College, where he remained for the rest of his life.

While teaching at Hebrew Union College in Cincinnati, Ohio, Cronbach participated in Cincinnati's Jewish Fellowship House and the Cincinnati Big Brother's Association. He was also an active member of the Central Conference of American Rabbis and the Union of American Hebrew Congregations (now known as the Union for Reform Judaism).

In 1939 Cronbach became secretary to the Board of Editors of the Hebrew Union College Annual.

Among the striking aspects of Judaism…is that of extolling certain texts as sacred and then using those texts to convey meanings far different from anything their authors had in mind. The most prevalent example of this is the…d’rash [sermon]. The propounding of such unmeant meanings however has not been limited to sermons. The Bible has undergone manipulation not only in the act of preaching…. Some of the weightiest thoughts emerging from the Bible have been thoughts that never existed in the minds of those who wrote the Bible.

— Abraham Cronbach, HUC Annual, Cincinnati, 1965, p. 99

== Pacifism and life during the World Wars ==
[War] entails a problem from which no one's attention can long be averted and an issue none dares evade. War is not a horror. It is a combination of horrors.

— -Rabbi Abraham Cronbach

=== Early pacifist actions ===
As a result of World War I, Cronbach became an ardent pacifist. He helped found the Peace Heroes Memorial Society in 1923. The Society's national headquarters were located in Cincinnati. Cronbach served as national secretary and was instrumental in establishing Memorial Day services around the country in honor of the heroes of industry, maternity, pacifism, etc. These services were an annual event in Cincinnati from 1923 through 1941.

Cronbach attempted to establish a specifically Jewish pacifist organization in 1924. A "Pledge for Jewish Pacifists" was sent out. Fifteen signed pledges were returned including ones from Maximilian Heller and Jacob Weinstein however a formal organization never developed. Cronbach desisted from the project at the request of the College Board of Hebrew Union College who saw Cronbach as a public relations problem that was "too serious to be overlooked in the name of academic freedom."

=== Controversy during World War II ===
With the threat and advent of World War II Cronbach's pacifist activities increased. Cronbach was familiar with controversy due to his pacifist beliefs. In 1935 he called for a conference between Nazis and Jews in Philadelphia for the purpose of reconciliation. During that same year he worked with the American Friends Service Committee to raise $5000 for an Austrian Relief Fund to aid persecuted Austrians, and German Jews and Nazis who had fled to Austria to escape Hitler's Germany.

=== Jewish Peace Fellowship ===
In 1942 along with Rabbi Isidor Hoffman and Jane Evans, Cronbach established the Jewish Peace Fellowship, which caused a brief collision between Cronbach and the College Board of Hebrew Union College. The Jewish Peace Fellowship has had many prominent Jews as associates including Rabbi Leo Baeck, Albert Einstein, and Rabbi Abraham Joshua Heschel. For more than 50 years, Jewish Peace Fellowship has helped young Jewish conscientious objectors and is still active today. Cronbach has been quoted describing the fellowship as a

religious organization of Jewish persons who believe war to be as futile as it is fiendish.

—

=== The impact of the Holocaust ===
Throughout the Holocaust Cronbach felt the weight of the suffering of the German Jews; he wore a "yellow badge", the yellow Star of David, sewn by his wife. At the end of the war when Cronbach's friend Rabbi Leo Baeck returned after being imprisoned in a concentration camp he and Cronbach exchanged their yellow stars; the one Baeck had been forced to wear as a sign of oppression and the one Cronbach willingly wore in support of his suffering brethren. Baeck's yellow star now resides with Cronbach's two grandsons.

After the Allied victory of World War II Cronbach addressed letters to such Jewish organizations as the American Jewish Committee, American Jewish Conference, and the American Jewish Congress asking that they not seek punishment of Nazi war criminals.

=== Views on Zionism ===
Cronbach was not dogmatic on the issue of Zionism but generally hewed to the views instilled by his Classical Reform training, and remained consistent in opposing Israeli militarism. He became active with the American Council for Judaism and was a revered member of its leadership until his death.

== Rosenbergs ==
In 1952 Cronbach became a sponsor of the committee to Secure Justice in the Rosenberg Case and worked for the committee for the next two years. Cronbach carried on an active letter writing campaign that urged others to help secure clemency for the Rosenbergs. "In May 1953, a Conference of Inquiry was held, sponsored by such people as Rabbi Abraham Cronbach and Mary Church Terrell on the national level."

On June 16, 1953, Cronbach met with President Eisenhower to urge him to pardon the Rosenbergs. Cronbach compiled a book about his experience with the Rosenberg case.

Cronbach appeared with Julius Rosenberg's mother and the Rosenbergs two small sons at a protest meeting in front of the White House after the Rosenbergs had been found guilty. Julius and Ethel Rosenberg were executed at Sing Sing prison in New York on June 19, 1953, more than two years after being found guilty of conspiracy to commit espionage. Cronbach gave a eulogy at the Rosenberg's funeral on June 21, 1953. "Rabbi Cronbach's impassioned eulogy [...] is an eloquent statement against excessive punishment and in favor of the positive synergy existing between American patriotism and Judaism."

Cronbach's eulogy for the Rosenbergs can be found in the Abraham Cronbach collection at the Jacob Rader Marcus Center of the American Jewish Archives.

== Later life ==
Abraham and Rose

In 1950 Cronbach retired from active teaching and became Emeritus Professor of Social Studies at Hebrew Union College. From then on he devoted most of his time to writing and published numerous articles and several books including "The Realities of Religion: A New Approach", "Stories Made of Bible Stories", "The Quest for Peace", and "The Bible and Our Social Outlook".

Ohel Avraham Synagogue (formerly Cronbach Chapel) at The Leo Baeck Education Center in Haifa, Israel was named in honor of Cronbach by the National Federation of Temple Youth (now known as the North American Federation of Temple Youth or NFTY).

Cronbach died in Cincinnati, Ohio. He is interred near his home in the Clifton neighborhood of Cincinnati. His wife was interred with him in 1982.

== Publications ==
- Social Creeds of the Churches: A Comparative Study (1923)
- Prayers of the Jewish Advance (Bloch publishing Company, 1924)
- Peace Stories (Department of Synagogue and School Extension of the Union of American Hebrew Congregations, 1932)
- The Social Outlook of Modern Judaism (Committee on Religious Work in Universities of the Central Conference of American Rabbis, 1936)
- The Quest for Peace (Cincinnati: Sinai Press, 1937)
- The Bible and Our Social Outlook (Union of American Hebrew Congregations, 1941)
- The Realities of Religion (Bookman Associates, 1957)
- Reform Movements in Judaism
