= American Jewish Conference =

American Jewish Conference was an ad hoc organization

== History ==
The American Jewish Conference first met in Pittsburgh, Pennsylvania, in January 1943, and had its first official conference in August that year. The initial meeting included delegates from thirty-two national Jewish organizations. It was called to decide upon the role that the American Jewish community would play in representing Jewish demands after the war and helping to build Jewish Palestine. The conference, a parliamentary-style political body, included 500 delegates collectively representing 2.25 million Jews in the United States. Labor Zionist leader Judah Pilch observed that the conference was a new form of "Jewish self-government" in America, an American version of Vaad Leumi.

The 1943 conference followed decades of the American Jewish Congress movement to develop a collective Jewish nationalism in America. When the first Congress met in 1918, it was estimated to represent 90 of American Jews, including Labor Zionists, General Zionists, Marxist socialists, religious Zionists, labor unions, and more. However the Congress movement declined by 1920. Historians generally consider this the final attempt of American Jews to organize into a formal national polity.

At the first meeting, moderate American Zionists including Rabbi Stephen Samuel Wise, were eager to concentrate on supporting Zionism through philanthropy and play down the "maximalist" goal of a “Jewish commonwealth.” Rabbi Abba Hillel Silver, representing the maximalists, called for the delegates to endorse the Biltmore Program. Silver's followers characterized the contrast between the two as "Aggressive Zionism" versus "the Politics of the Green Light [from the White House]." He also attacked Wise's views, which upset the delegates from the American Jewish Committee, and caused them to walk out. The conference proceeded and sided with Silver and he emerged from the meeting as the new leader of American Zionism. Silver called for "loud diplomacy." Edward Tivnan writes, "The American Jewish community now had a full-fledged 'Jewish lobby.' In 1943, Silver cranked up the Zionist Organization of America's one-man lobbying operation in Washington --- renaming it the American Zionist Emergency Council (AZEC) --- and began to mobilize American Jewry into a mass movement."

In December 1943, the American Jewish Conference launched a public attack against Hillel Kook and the “Bergson Group” in an attempt to reduce support for the Irgun and Revisionist Zionism in the US and their agenda to more actively rescue European Jews. Following the victory of World War II Abraham Cronbach wrote letters to American Jewish Conference and other Jewish organizations asking that they not seek punishment of Nazi war criminals.

Philip Morris Klutznick, the newly elected president of B’nai B’rith in the early 1950s, remembers the difficulties of getting any consensus in the "majority rule” American Jewish Conference.

The American Jewish Conference ended its activities in 1949.

== See also ==
- Jewish lobby
- Jewish Federations of North America
