= Sidney Matthew Metzger =

American prelate

The Most Reverend Sidney Matthew Metzger
- Bishop of El Paso
- Church: Roman Catholic Church
- See: Diocese of El Paso
- Predecessor: Anthony Joseph Schuler
- Successor: Patrick Fernández Flores
- Other posts: Auxiliary Bishop of Santa Fe; 1940 to 1941; Coadjutor Bishop of El Paso; 1941 to 1942

Orders
- Ordination: April 3, 1926
- Consecration: April 10, 1939 by Arthur Drossaerts

Personal details
- Born: July 11, 1902 Fredericksburg, Texas, US
- Died: April 12, 1986 (aged 83) El Paso, Texas, US
- Education: St. Joseph Seminary; Pontifical North American College

Styles of Sidney Metzger
- Reference style: The Most Reverend
- Spoken style: Your Excellency
- Religious style: Monsignor
- Posthumous style: none

Sidney Matthew Metzger, STD, JCD (July 11, 1902 – April 12, 1986) was an American prelate of the Roman Catholic Church who served as bishop of the Diocese of El Paso in Texas from 1942 to 1978. He previously served as an auxiliary bishop of the Diocese of Santa Fe in New Mexico from 1940 to 1941.

== Biography ==
=== Early life ===
Born in Fredericksburg, Texas, on July 11, 1902, Sidney Metzger studied at St. Joseph Seminary in San Antonio and the Pontifical North American College in Rome. He was ordained to the priesthood on April 3, 1926. During his studies, he obtained Doctor of Sacred Theology and Doctor of Canon Law degrees.

=== Auxiliary Bishop of Santa Fe ===
On December 27, 1939, Metzger was appointed auxiliary bishop of the Diocese of Santa Fe and titular bishop of Birtha by Pope Pius XII. He received his episcopal consecration on April 10, 1940, from Archbishop Arthur Drossaerts, with Archbishop Rudolph Gerken and Bishop Mariano Garriga serving as co-consecrators.

=== Coadjutor Bishop and Bishop of El Paso ===
Metzger was named coadjutor bishop of the Diocese of El Paso on December 26, 1941. He automatically succeeded Bishop Anthony Schuler on November 29, 1942, as bishop.

As Bishop, one of Metzger's challenges was to restore diocesan financial stability whilst creating new parishes and ministries for the growing Catholic population. He also established St. Charles Borromeo Seminary in 1961. From 1962 to 1965, Metzger attended the Second Vatican Council.

In 1973, Metzger attacked Farah Manufacturing Company for unfair labor practices and asked his fellow clergymen to urge retailers to no longer order from Farah, saying, "I feel that the company is acting unjustly in denying to the workers the basic right to collective bargaining." William Farah, the company's president, subsequently called Metzger a member of the "rotten old bourgeoisie" and a man who is "lolling in wealth".

After thirty-five years of service, Metzger resigned as El Paso's bishop on March 17, 1978. He later died at Hotel Dieu Hospital, at age 83.

Catholic Church titles
Preceded by Anthony Schuler, SJ	Bishop of El Paso; 1942–1978	Succeeded by Patrick Flores
