= Jewish English Lexicon =

Jewish English Lexicon (JEL) is an online dictionary of the language spoken by Jewish English speakers, encompassesing a varied assortment of terms that originate from ancient and modern Hebrew, Aramaic, Yiddish, Ladino, Arabic, among other languages. The lexicon treats "Jewish English" as a Jewish dialect of English as the overall structure of English remains intact despite the numerous distinctive additions from other languages.

== Overview ==
The Jewish English Lexicon was created by Sarah Bunin Benor, an associate professor of Jewish studies at the Los Angeles division of Hebrew Union College. Benor, a scholar of the varieties of Jewish English spoken in the United States, created the lexicon in 2012 with the support of volunteers who contribute to the growth of the lexicon's database. Benor originally formed the lexicon as a class project several years prior to its publication on the internet. The lexicon offers a variety of search tools and filters including language of origin, regions where the word is commonly used, the groups of people who tend to speak the word, and dictionaries in which the term appears.

== See also ==
- Yinglish
- Yeshivish
