= Anthony Joseph Schuler =

American prelate

His Excellency, The Most Reverend Anthony Joseph Schuler SJ
- Bishop of El Paso titular bishop of Aradus
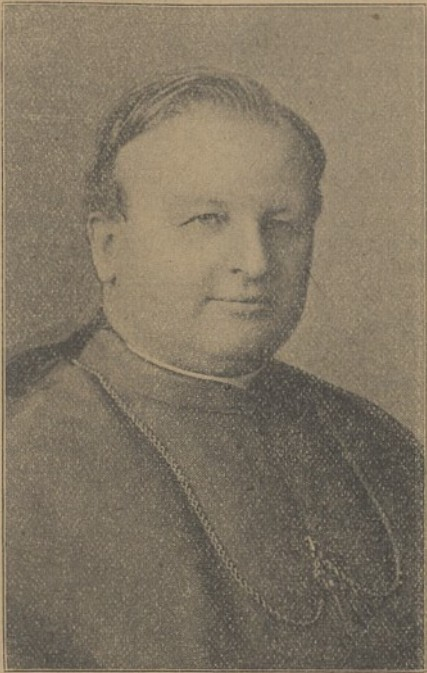
- Church: Catholic Church
- Diocese: El Paso
- Appointed: June 17, 1915
- Retired: November 29, 1942
- Predecessor: Office established
- Successor: Sidney Matthew Metzger

Orders
- Ordination: June 27, 1901 by Sebastiano Martinelli
- Consecration: October 28, 1915 by John Baptist Pitaval

Personal details
- Born: September 20, 1869 St. Marys, Pennsylvania, U.S.
- Died: June 3, 1944 (aged 74) Denver, Colorado, U.S.
- Education: Saint Louis University; Woodstock College
- Motto: Magister unus Christus (Christ the one teacher)

Anthony Joseph Schuler SJ (September 20, 1869 – June 3, 1944) was an American prelate of the Catholic Church. A member of the Society of Jesus (Jesuits), he served as the first bishop of El Paso in Texas and New Mexico from 1915 to 1942.

== Biography ==
=== Early life and education ===
Schuler was born on September 20, 1869, in St. Marys, Pennsylvania. He was the eldest of four children of Joseph and Albertina (née Algaier) Schuler, both immigrants from Oberprechtal in Germany. In 1876, the family moved to Georgetown, Colorado, where Schuler's father worked in the gold mines of Chicago Creek.

After his father died in a mining accident in 1883, Schuler was mentored by his local Catholic priest, Reverend Nicholas Chrysostom Matz. Schuler later recalled that he, "became a father to me in every way." With Matz's help, Schuler secured two part-time jobs to support his family, one as a day laborer in the mines and the other as a store clerk. Since he was unable to attend school while working, he received private instruction under Matz. When the archdiocese assigned Matz to a Denver parish in 1885, Schuler moved there also. In Denver, he assisted Matz as a sacristan at St. Anne's Parish while furthering his education.

After hearing a sermon from Reverend Arnold Damen, a prominent Jesuit missionary, Schuler decided to join the order. On December 7, 1886, he was admitted to the Society of Jesus and entered St. Stanislaus Seminary in Florissant, Missouri. He professed his first vows as a Jesuit on December 8, 1888. He studied at St. Stanislaus and Saint Louis University in St. Louis, Missouri. In1893, Schuler was appointed to the faculty of Sacred Heart College (now Regis University) in Denver. He remained there for five years, then moved to Woodstock College in Woodstock, Maryland, to complete his theological studies.

=== Priesthood ===
While at Woodstock, Schuler was ordained a priest for the Jesuits on June 27, 1901, by Cardinal Sebastiano Martinelli, the Apostolic Delegate to the United States. Following his ordination, the Jesuits allowed Schuler to skip the traditional tertianship period of formation and named him as president of Sacred Heart College.

Schuler professed his final vows as a Jesuit on March 25, 1908. That same year, the Jesuits transferred him from Sacred Heart College to El Paso, Texas, where he served as assistant pastor at Immaculate Conception Parish and chaplain to both Hotel Dieu Hospital and Holy Family Chapel. In 1911, Schuler was reassigned to Denver to serve as assistant pastor at Sacred Heart Parish, becoming its full pastor in 1912.

=== Bishop of El Paso ===
On June 17, 1915, Schuler was named the first bishop of El Paso by Pope Benedict XV. The diocese had been created by Pope Pius X in March 1914, comprising more than 60,000 square miles across West Texas and southern New Mexico. However, the diocese remained without a bishop for more than a year following the death of Pius X in August 1914 and the refusal of Reverend John J. Brown to accept his appointment as the diocese's bishop. Rome accepted Brown's resignation and selected Schuler instead.

Schuler received his episcopal consecration on October 28, 1915, from Archbishop John Baptist Pitaval, with Bishops Patrick A. McGovern and Henry Regis Granjon serving as co-consecrators, at the Cathedral of the Immaculate Conception in Denver. The ceremony was attended by Matz, who had become bishop of Denver in 1889, and Schuler's mother Albertina, who received her son's first episcopal blessing.

On November 11, 1915, Schuler was installed at Immaculate Conception Church in El Paso. At the beginning of Schuler's tenure in 1915, the diocese contained 31 priests, 22 parishes, 58 missions, nine parochial schools, and three academies to serve 64,440 Catholics. By the end of Schuler's tenure 27 years later in 1942, there was a Catholic population of 121,854, as well as 118 priests, 49 parishes, 97 missions, 12 parochial schools, and five academies.

With Immaculate Conception Church being too small to accommodate the growing congregation, Schuler laid the cornerstone of a new cathedral in El Paso on November 12, 1916. The Cathedral of St. Patrick was officially dedicated on November 29, 1917. During the Mexican Revolution of 1910 to 1920, Schuler provided refuge in the diocese for the many Catholic clergy and religious orders who fled persecution in Mexico. One such seminarian was Peter of Jesus Maldonado, who was ordained a priest by Schuler in 1918. Maldonado was murdered in Mexico in 1937 and canonized by Pope John Paul II in 2000.

Described as a "liberal" by the El Paso Times, Schuler was known to be tolerant of other faiths; speakers at the 1936 celebration of his 50 years as a Jesuit included the Episcopal bishop Frederick Bingham Howden and the Jewish rabbi Martin Zielonka. Schuler disagreed with prohibition of alcohol in the United States, calling the Eighteenth Amendment to the US Constitution a "failure" and "one of the greatest curses ever placed on this country." He also declared there was "no harm" in betting on horse racing, saying, "It is not a sin in itself, the sin lying in the abuse of it."

=== Retirement and death ===
In December 1941, the 72-year-old Schuler received Bishop Sidney Matthew Metzger, previously an auxiliary bishop of the Archdiocese of Santa Fe, as a coadjutor bishop with the right of succession. With a successor in place, Schuler announced his resignation as bishop of El Paso on November 22, 1942. He received the honorary title of titular bishop of Aradus on November 29th from Pope Pius XII.

Schuler spent his retirement at Regis University, where he died on June 3, 1944, at age 74. He was originally buried at Concordia Cemetery in El Paso, but his remains were later moved to Mount Carmel Cemetery of the same city in 1983.

== Sources ==
- Owens, M. Lilliana (1953). Most Rev. Anthony J. Schuler, First Bishop of El Paso; And Some Catholic Activities in the Diocese Between 1915-1942. Revista Catolica Press.
- "Obituary". Woodstock Letters. LXXIII (3): 229–238. 1944.

Catholic Church titles
New office	1st Bishop of El Paso; 1915—1942	Succeeded by Sidney Matthew Metzger
