= Jonathan Rosenbaum (scholar) =

American scholar, college administrator, and rabbi

- Born: 1947 (age 78–79)
- Occupations: professor, administrator and rabbi

Academic background
- Education: University of Michigan; Hebrew Union College-Jewish Institute; Harvard University

Academic work
- Discipline: Near Eastern Languages and Civilization
- Institutions: Gratz College; University of Hartford; University of Nebraska–Lincoln
- Main interests: Biblical history; ancient Semitic languages; American Jewish history

Jonathan Rosenbaum (born 1947) is an American scholar, college administrator and rabbi. He was president of Gratz College from 1998 to 2009, and beginning in 2009 a visiting scholar at the University of Pennsylvania. He is a specialist in Biblical history, the paleography and epigraphy of ancient Semitic languages, and American Jewish history.

== Life ==
Rosenbaum was born in Michigan and is a graduate of the University of Michigan where he received his B.A. with high distinction and highest honors and was elected to Phi Beta Kappa (1968). Rosenbaum then earned rabbinical ordination and an M.A. (1972) at the Hebrew Union College-Jewish Institute in Cincinnati and a Ph.D. in Near Eastern Languages and Civilization from Harvard University in 1978.

He taught in the Department of Religious Studies at the University of Nebraska–Lincoln from 1976 to 1986 and then became the University of Hartford's first Maurice Greenberg Professor of Judaic Studies and director of its Maurice Greenberg Center for Judaic Studies from 1986 to 1998. At Hartford he was also professor of history, served as acting chair of the department of history, and established a major and minors in Judaic Studies and a joint master's degree with the University of Connecticut. He conceived and helped guide the Henry Luce Forum in Abrahamic Religions, a program jointly sponsored by the University of Hartford and Hartford Seminary and devoted to advancing scholarship concerning and mutual understanding among American Jews, Christians, and Muslims. Rosenbaum also initiated and oversaw an awards program that recognizes the best public and private school teachers of Holocaust studies in New England.

From 1995 to 1998 Rosenbaum served as a deputy director of the Ein Gedi Archaeological Expedition in Israel, an excavation co-sponsored by the Hebrew University of Jerusalem and the University of Hartford. At Ein Gedi he oversaw the excavation's academic program including courses in archaeology and Near Eastern history.

He also organized and chaired "Paleographical Studies in the Ancient Near East," a section of the national meeting sponsored by the Society of Biblical Literature. In addition, he taught in the graduate and law schools of the University of Connecticut and at Hartford Seminary.

Rosenbaum has served as a rabbi in Reform, Conservative, and Orthodox congregations. During his student years at HUC-JIR, he held a student rabbi position at Congregation Israel (Reform) in Galesburg, Illinois (1970–1972). While at Harvard he was assistant rabbi, Temple Israel (Conservative), Swampscott, Massachusetts, (1972–76), and then a part-time rabbi of Congregation Israel (Conservative), Danville, Illinois (1976–1984). From 1994 to 1998 he was rabbi (mara' de-atra) of Congregation Agudas Achim, a mainstream Orthodox, century-old congregation in West Hartford, Connecticut.

Among the awards he received were Doctor of Divinity, honoris causa, by HUC-JIR and Doctor of Hebrew Letters, honoris causa, from the Jewish Theological Seminary.

At Gratz College he instituted new academic programs including a doctoral degree and online courses and degrees, expanded the faculty and staff, successfully oversaw development, and refashioned Gratz's mission in a changing academic climate.

== Selected publications ==
- Making a Life, Building a Community: A History of the Jews of Hartford (co-authored with David G. Dalin, 1997)
- Journal of Jewish Communal Service (78:4, 2002), special issue devoted to Philadelphia Jewry (co-edited with Ernest M. Kahn).
- Three Unpublished Ostraca from Gezer, with Joe D. Seger, Bulletin of the American Schools of Oriental Research, No. 264 (Nov., 1986), pp. 51–60
- Hezekiah's Reform and the Deuteronomistic Tradition, Harvard Theological Review, Vol. 72, No. 1/2 (Jan. - Apr., 1979), pp. 23–43
