= Alfred Gottschalk (rabbi) =

German-American rabbi (1930–2009)

6th President of Hebrew Union College - Jewish Institute of Religion
- In office 1971–1996
- Preceded by: Nelson Glueck
- Succeeded by: Sheldon Zimmerman

Personal details
- Born: March 7, 1930 Oberwesel, Germany
- Died: September 12, 2009 (aged 79) Cincinnati, Ohio
- Spouse(s): Regina Schrag (divorced); Deanna Zeff Frank
- Education: Brooklyn College (BA); Hebrew Union College (MA); University of Southern California (PhD)

Alfred Gottschalk (March 7, 1930 – September 12, 2009) was a German-born American rabbi who was a leader in the Reform Judaism movement, serving as head of the movement's Hebrew Union College-Jewish Institute of Religion (HUC) for 30 years; as a president from 1971 to 1996, and then as chancellor until 2000. In that role, Rabbi Gottschalk oversaw the ordination of the first women to be ordained as rabbis in the United States and Israel, and he oversaw the development of new HUC campuses in Jerusalem, Los Angeles and New York City, three of the school's four campuses.

== Early life and education ==
Gottschalk was born in Oberwesel, Germany on March 7, 1930, the only son of Max and Erna (Trum) Gottschalk. He was born to a family that had lived in the Rhineland for four centuries. As a child in 1937, he was admonished by his mother for leaving the house to watch Adolf Hitler pass by in a motorcade, telling him that: "A Jew risks a lot doing that". He would lose dozens of family members in The Holocaust, and maintained a commitment to the preservation of the Jewish religion and identity exemplified by his grandfather's having given him shreds of a Torah scroll the day after the November 1938 Kristallnacht that had been desecrated and thrown into a river during the anti-Jewish pogrom and telling Gottschalk that "one day we will put them together again".

His father escaped Nazi Germany for New York City in 1938. As a nine-year-old, Gottschalk was forced out of his classroom by a Nazi shouting: "Jews, raus! [out], raus! RAUS!", an incident that his successor as President of HUC, Rabbi David Ellenson described as being the impetus behind Gottschalk's "life's work on behalf of the Jewish people and humanity" and as one that Gottschalk would recall with "sadness, humiliation, and fury" 50 years later. After his expulsion from school, he recalled being beaten on Good Friday by a group of Catholic boys for the death of Werner, a Catholic boy who was said to have been killed by Jews on Maundy Thursday in the 13th century. He returned to visit his hometown of Oberwesel in September 2006, more than 60 years after he had left it, the only Jewish survivor of that town's small Jewish community.

He and his mother managed to leave Germany for the United States to join his father in 1939. His family settled in Brooklyn, where he learned English while watching films he had paid for with money he had earned shining shoes. He "once thanked Ronald Reagan for teaching [him] English", having seen the President in many of the films he saw as a child new to the United States. He became a naturalized citizen of the United States in 1945. He attended Boys High School and made the choice to become a rabbi when he was 15 years old, having heard speeches from Rabbi Stephen Samuel Wise. After his father died, Gottschalk helped support the family by playing semi professional football.

He earned his undergraduate degree at Brooklyn College and then attended Hebrew Union College in Cincinnati, from which he received his rabbinic ordination in 1957, simultaneously earning a master's in Hebrew literature. In 1965, he earned his Ph.D. in Bible and Jewish thought from University of Southern California with a dissertation on Ahad Ha'am, the pen name of pre-state Zionist thinker and essayist Asher Zvi Hirsch Ginsberg.

== Hebrew Union College ==
After being hired by Hebrew Union College, he became dean of its campus in Los Angeles, which he relocated from the Hollywood Hills to a site adjoining the University of Southern California. He succeeded Nelson Glueck, who had died in Cincinnati in February 1971, to become Hebrew Union College's sixth president. As HUC's president, he relocated its New York City campus from the Upper West Side to a Greenwich Village location near New York University.

In perpetuating and expanding the modernizing tradition of the Reform movement, Gottschalk performed the June 1972 ordination of Rabbi Sally Priesand, the first woman to be ordained in the United States and believed to be only the second woman ever to be formally ordained in the millennia-long history of Judaism. Rabbi Gottschalk called the ordination of Priesand "historic", one that breaks stereotypes and allows "Jewish women to consider seeking the rabbinate" and a testament to Reform Judaism's efforts at achieving "equality of women in the congregation of the Lord". Priesand wept when Gottschalk spoke with her as she was handed her ordination certificate.

In 1975, Rabbi Gottschalk oversaw the designation of American Reform Judaism's first female hazzan (cantor), Barbara Herman. In July 1992, he oversaw the "historic and symbolic" ordination of Israel's first woman rabbi, Naamah Kelman. After years of blocking the admission or ordination of suspected gay or lesbian students, Gottschalk reluctantly permitted the admission of gay and lesbian students to the school beginning around 1990. The seminary later established the Institute for Judaism and Sexual Orientation to help create opportunities for active participation by gays and lesbians in the Jewish life cycle. Rabbi Gottschalk spoke at the Presidential Inauguration of Ronald Reagan. He was one of the founders of the Underground Railway Museum in Cincinnati, Ohio.

Rabbi Gottschalk was named as one of the perpetrators of sexual misconduct during his time at HUC in the Report of Investigation into Allegations of Misconduct at Hebrew Union College-Jewish Institute of Religion prepared by the law firm Morgan Lewis, released in November 2021. Multiple witnesses provided interviews describing Rabbi Gottschalk propositioning students, kissing and touching female students without consent, and inviting students back to his apartment only to describe how lonely he was without his wife. "Despite the seemingly prevalent allegations of Dr. Gottschalk's misconduct, we did not find any documents evidencing that Dr. Gottschalk's conduct was ever reported to anyone in the administration or the Board. (As one witness pointed out, it was hard to know to whom to complain when the President of the school was the wrongdoer.)"

== Holocaust memorialization ==
Appointed by President of the United States Jimmy Carter to a commission tasked with developing a memorial to the Holocaust, Gottschalk advocated on behalf of something more substantial than a monument, leading to the development of the United States Holocaust Memorial Museum which opened in 1993 adjacent to the National Mall in Washington, D.C.

As president of New York City's Museum of Jewish Heritage from 2000 until 2003, Gottschalk oversaw the development and fundraising for the 60,000 square feet (5,600 m^{2}) Robert M. Morgenthau wing of the museum.

== Personal ==
A prolific author, he wrote more than 100 articles, books and other works.

Gottschalk lived in New York City. He died at age 79 on September 12, 2009 in a Cincinnati hospital due to complications of a traffic collision that he had in October 2008. Rabbi David Ellenson delivered a eulogy in funeral services held in Cincinnati's Isaac M. Wise Temple.

He was survived by his second wife, the former Deanna Zeff Frank, as well as by a daughter and a son from his first wife, and their five grandchildren, together with two stepsons and their four children. His first marriage, to the former Gina Schrag (Regina Marilyn Schrag), ended in divorce.
