= Susannah Heschel =

American academic (born 1956)

- Born: May 15, 1956 (age 70)
- Parent: Abraham Joshua Heschel (father)

Academic background
- Education: Trinity College, Harvard Divinity School, University of Pennsylvania

Academic work
- Institutions: Dartmouth College
- Website: https://faculty-directory.dartmouth.edu/susannah-heschel

Signature
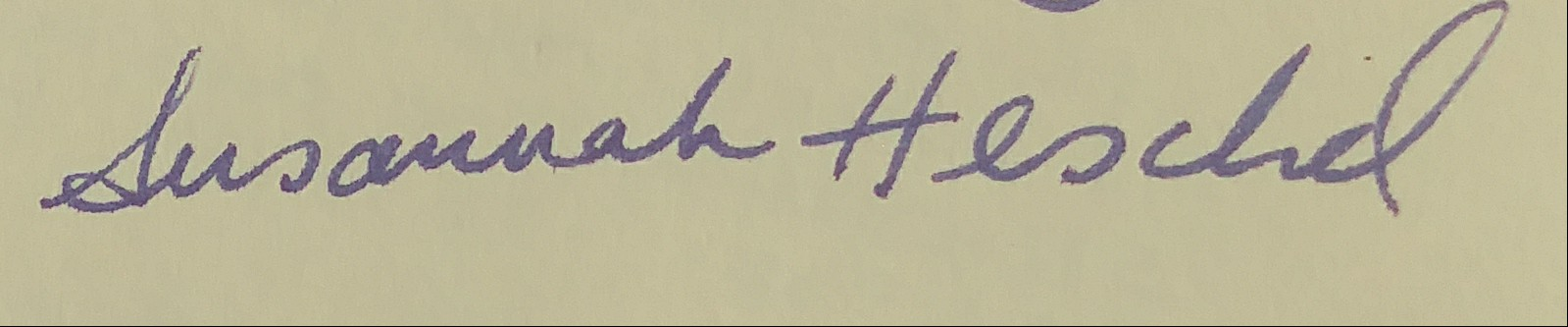

Susannah Heschel (born 15 May 1956) is an American scholar and professor of Jewish studies at Dartmouth College. The author and editor of numerous books and articles, she is a Guggenheim Fellow. Heschel's scholarship focuses on Jewish and Christian interactions in Germany during the nineteenth and twentieth centuries.

== Biography ==
Susannah Heschel is the daughter of Abraham Joshua Heschel, one of the leading Jewish theologians and Jewish philosophers of the twentieth century, and Sylvia, a concert pianist. In 1972, Heschel applied to the rabbinical school of the Jewish Theological Seminary of America in New York, which did not ordain women at that time and turned her down. In 1995, she married James Louis (Yaakov) Aronson, Professor Emeritus of Earth Sciences at Dartmouth College, with whom she has two daughters, Gittel Esther Devorah Heschel-Aronson and Avigael Natania Mira Heschel-Aronson.

== Academic career ==
Heschel received her doctorate from the University of Pennsylvania in 1989. She served as lecturer and then assistant professor of religious studies at Southern Methodist University from 1988 to 1991, and as Abba Hillel Silver associate professor of Jewish studies at Case Western Reserve University from 1991 to 1998. She was a Rockefeller Fellow at the National Humanities Center in 1997–98, received a Carnegie Foundation Fellowship in Islamic Studies in 2008, and spent two years at the Center for the Humanities at Tufts University. In 2013 she was awarded a Guggenheim Fellowship. In 2005, Heschel received an academic fellowship from the Ford Foundation which she used to convene a series of international conferences at Dartmouth College, that brought together scholars in the fields of Jewish studies and Islamic studies. One of the conferences honored the Arab philosopher Sadik al-Azm; another examined "Ink and Blood: Textuality and the Humane", at which Quranic scholar Angelika Neuwirth delivered the opening keynote address. In 2011–12 she held a fellowship at the Wissenschaftskolleg in Berlin.

She serves on the Beirat of the Zentrum Jüdische Studien in Berlin. In 1992–93 she was the Martin Buber visiting professor of Jewish religious philosophy at the University of Frankfurt; she has also taught at the University of Edinburgh, the University of Cape Town, Princeton University, the University of Lucerne, Switzerland, and Harvard University.

== Views and opinions ==
Heschel started a custom in the early 1980s of including an orange on the Passover Seder plate. The orange, she has said, represents "the fruitfulness of gay and lesbian Jews and the homosociality that has been such an important part of Jewish experience." The tradition began when Heschel visited the Hillel at Oberlin College and saw an early feminist haggadah that suggested adding a crust of bread to the Seder plate as a sign of solidarity with lesbian Jews. In her view, putting bread on the Seder plate would signify that lesbian and gay Jews are as incompatible with Judaism as chametz is with Passover. At her next Seder, she used an orange as a symbol of inclusion." Early in the seder, she wrote in a 2013 article for The Forward, "when stomachs were starting to growl, I asked each person to take a segment of the orange, make the blessing over fruit and eat the segment in recognition of gay and lesbian Jews and of widows, orphans, Jews who are adopted and all others who sometimes feel marginalized in the Jewish community." Spitting out the seeds represents "repudiat[ing] homophobia and ... recogniz[ing] that in a whole orange, each segment sticks together," Heschel has written.

A long-circulating urban legend has misrepresented Heschel's custom. As this version of the story has it, Heschel was giving a lecture in Florida at which a man in the audience yelled, “A woman belongs on the bimah like a piece of bread belongs on the seder plate," and she chose the orange to commemorate the incident and respond to her critic.

== Social activism ==
In 2006, Heschel served on the Green Zionist Alliance slate to the World Zionist Congress.

== Awards and recognition ==
Heschel is an honorary trustee of the Heschel School in New York. She has received an honorary doctorate in Humane Letters from Colorado College, an honorary doctorate of sacred letters from St. Michael's College of the University of Toronto, an honorary Doctor of Divinity degree from Trinity College, an honorary doctorate from the Augustana Theologische Hochschule, an honorary doctorate from the University of Lucerne. She also received the John M. Manley Huntington award from Dartmouth, and the Jacobus Family Fellowship from Dartmouth, the Professor John Rassias Faculty Award, Dartmouth College Alumni Association, 2025, and she was elected an honorary member of Phi Beta Kappa. She held a year-long fellowship at the National Humanities Center in 1997-98, a year-long fellowship at the Wissenschaftskolleg zu Berlin in 2011-12, and has received personal grants from the Ford Foundation and the Carnegie Foundation. In 2013, she received a Guggenheim Fellowship and the Peter Gomes Memorial Award from Harvard Divinity School. In 2016 she received the Moses Mendelssohn Award from the Leo Baeck Institute and in 2019 she was given the Scholar of the Year award of the Religious Communications Association. In 2014 she was elected to membership of the American Society for the Study of Religions, and in 2023 she was elected to membership of the American Academy for Jewish Research.

== Published works ==
Her monograph Abraham Geiger and the Jewish Jesus (1998, University of Chicago Press) won the Abraham Geiger Prize of the Geiger College in Germany and a National Jewish Book Award. She has also written The Aryan Jesus: Christian Theologians and the Bible in Nazi Germany (2008, Princeton University Press), Jüdischer Islam: Islam und jüdisch-deutsche Selbstbestimmung (Mathes und Seitz, 2018), and The Woman Question in Jewish Studies, written with Sarah Imhoff (Princeton University Press 2024). She has edited Moral Grandeur and Spiritual Audacity: Essays of Abraham Joshua Heschel, Betrayal: German Churches and the Holocaust (with Robert P. Ericksen), Insider/Outsider: American Jews and Multiculturalism (with David Biale and Michael Galchinsky), and On Being a Jewish Feminist.

She has also co-edited, with Christopher Browning and Michael Marrus, Holocaust Scholarship: Personal Trajectories and Professional Interpretations. With Umar Ryad, she co-edited The Muslim Reception of European Orientalism. Among her recent articles are “Antisemitism in America,” Oxford Handbook of American Jewish History, ed. Michael Cohen and Shari Rabin (Oxford University Press, 2025); “Being Adolf Hitler: Mein Kampf as Antisemitic Bildungsroman,” in: Hitler’s Mein Kampf and the Holocaust: A Prelude to Genocide, ed. John J. Michalczyk, Michael S. Bryant and Susan A. Michalczyk (NY: Bloomsbury, 2022); “Sacrament versus Racism: Converted Jews in Nazi Germany,” in: On Being Adjacent to Historical Violence, ed. Irene Kacandes (Berlin: De Gruyter, 2022); “The Philological Uncanny: Nineteenth-Century Jewish Readings of the Qur’an,” The Journal of Qur’anic Studies 20:3 (Fall 2018); “A Friendship in the Prophetic Tradition: Abraham Joshua Heschel and Martin Luther King, Jr.,” Telos (April 2018); "The Slippery Yet Tenacious Nature of Racism: New Developments in Critical Race Theory and Their Implications for the Study of Religion and Ethics", "Jewish and Muslim Feminist Theologies in Dialogue: Discourses of Difference", "Constructions of Jewish Identity through Reflections on Islam", and "German Jewish Scholarship on Islam as a Tool for De-Orientalizing Judaism".
