= Abraham Joshua Heschel =

American rabbi, theologian, and philosopher

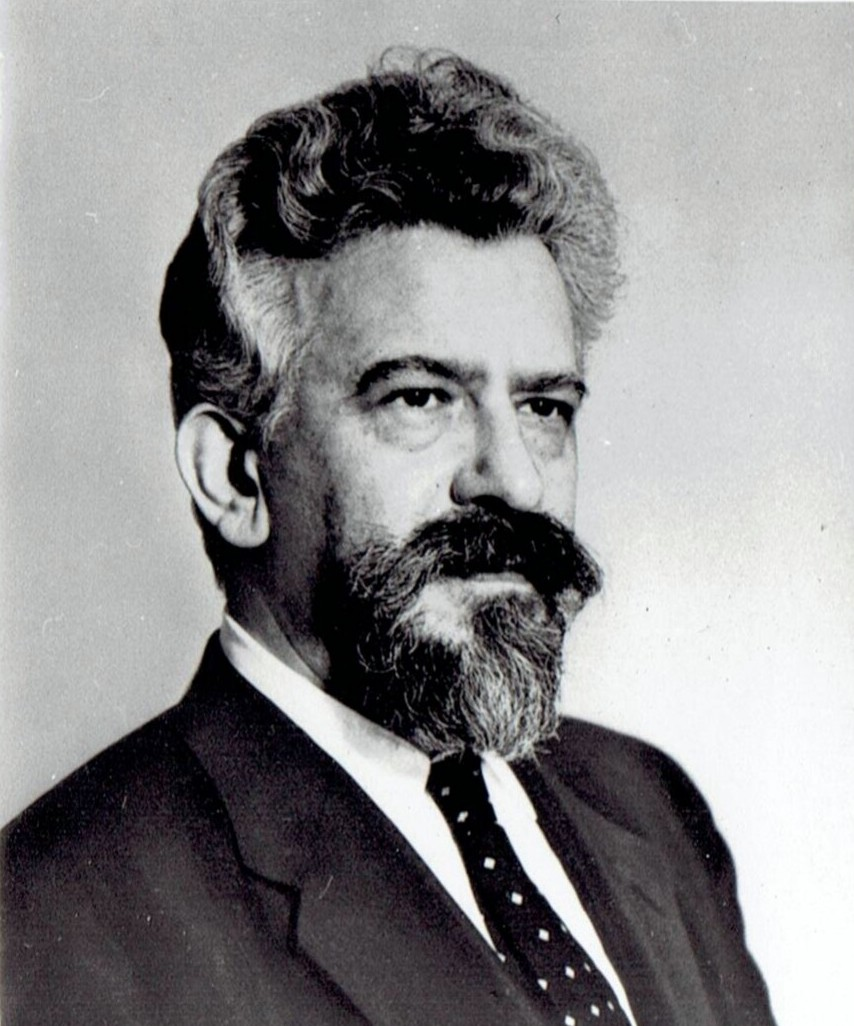
- Heschel in 1964

Personal life
- Born: January 11, 1907 Warsaw, Congress Poland
- Died: December 23, 1972 (aged 65) New York, New York, U.S.
- Spouse: Sylvia Straus (m. 1946)
- Children: Susannah
- Education: University of Berlin; Higher Institute for Jewish Studies

Religious life
- Religion: Judaism
- Denomination: Orthodox, Conservative
- Profession: Rabbi, theologian, philosopher

Abraham Joshua Heschel (January 11, 1907 – December 23, 1972) was a Polish-born American rabbi and one of the leading Jewish theologians and philosophers of the 20th century. Heschel, a professor of Jewish mysticism at the Jewish Theological Seminary of America, authored a number of widely read books on Jewish philosophy and was a leader in the U.S. civil rights movement.

== Biography ==
Abraham Joshua Heschel was born in Warsaw in 1907, the youngest of six children of Moshe Mordechai Heschel and Rifka Reizel Heschel née Perlow. His father was originally from Medzhybizh and his mother was from Mińsk Mazowiecki. He was descended from preeminent European rabbis on both sides of his family. His paternal great-great-grandfather and namesake was Rebbe Avraham Yehoshua Heshel of Apt in present-day Poland. His mother was also a descendant of Avraham Yehoshua Heshel and other Hasidic dynasties. His siblings were Sarah, Dvora Miriam, Esther Sima, Gittel, and Jacob. Their father Moshe died of influenza in 1916 when Abraham was nine. He was tutored by a Gerrer Hasid who introduced him to the thought of Rabbi Menachem Mendel of Kotzk.

After a traditional yeshiva education and studying for Orthodox rabbinical ordination (semicha), Heschel pursued his doctorate at the University of Berlin and rabbinic ordination at the non-denominational Hochschule für die Wissenschaft des Judentums. There he studied under notable scholars including Hanoch Albeck, Ismar Elbogen, Julius Guttmann, Alexander Guttmann, and Leo Baeck. His mentor in Berlin was David Koigen. Heschel later taught Talmud at the Hochschule. He joined a Yiddish poetry group, Jung Vilna, and in 1933, published a volume of Yiddish poems, Der Shem Hamefoyrosh: Mentsch, dedicated to his father.

In late October 1938, while living in a rented room in the home of a Jewish family in Frankfurt, Heschel was arrested by the Gestapo and deported to Poland in the Polenaktion. He then spent ten months lecturing on Jewish philosophy and Torah at Warsaw's Institute for Jewish Studies. Six weeks before the German invasion of Poland, Heschel fled Warsaw for London with the help of Julian Morgenstern, president of Hebrew Union College, and Alexander Guttmann, an eventual colleague at the Hebrew Union College, who secretly re-wrote Heschel's ordination certificate to meet American visa requirements.

Heschel's sister Esther was killed in the German bombing of Warsaw. His mother was murdered by Nazis who broke into her flat in the Warsaw Ghetto, where his sister Gittel also died, and his sister Devorah was deported from Vienna to Auschwitz, where she perished. He never returned to Germany, Austria or Poland. He once wrote, "If I should go to Poland or Germany, every stone, every tree would remind me of contempt, hatred, murder, of children killed, of mothers burned alive, of human beings asphyxiated."

Heschel arrived in New York City in March 1940. He soon left for Cincinnati, serving on the faculty of Hebrew Union College (HUC), the main seminary of Reform Judaism, for five years. In 1946 he returned to New York, taking a position with the Jewish Theological Seminary of America (JTS), the main seminary of Conservative Judaism. He remained with JTS as professor of Jewish ethics and Kabbalah until his death in 1972. At the time of his death, Heschel lived near JTS at 425 Riverside Drive in Manhattan.

Heschel married Sylvia Straus, a concert pianist, on December 10, 1946, in Los Angeles. Their daughter, Susannah Heschel, became a Jewish scholar in her own right.

== Ideology ==
Heschel (2nd from right) in the Selma Civil Rights march with Martin Luther King Jr. (4th from right). Heschel later wrote, "When I marched in Selma, my feet were praying."

Heschel explicated many facets of Jewish thought, including studies on medieval Jewish philosophy, Kabbalah, and Hasidic philosophy. According to some scholars, he was more interested in spirituality than in critical text study; the latter was a specialty of many scholars at JTS. He was not given a graduate assistant for many years and he was mainly relegated to teach in the education school or the Rabbinical school, not in the academic graduate program. Heschel became friendly with his colleague Mordecai Kaplan. Though they differed in their approaches to Judaism, they had a very cordial relationship and visited each other's homes from time to time.

Heschel believed that the teachings of the Hebrew prophets were a clarion call for social action in the United States. He wrote about segregation, "Some are guilty, but all are responsible". He worked for African Americans' civil rights and spoke out against the Vietnam War.

He also criticized what he specifically called "pan-halakhism," or an exclusive focus upon religiously compatible behavior to the neglect of the non-legalistic dimension of rabbinic tradition.

Heschel is notable as a recent proponent of what one scholar calls the "Nachmanidean" school of Jewish thought - emphasizing the mutually dependent relationship between God and man - as opposed to the "Maimonidean" school in which God is independent and unchangeable. In Heschel's language, the "Maimonidean" perspective is associated with Rabbi Yishmael and the "Nachmanidean" perspective with Rabbi Akiva; according to Heschel neither perspective should be adopted in isolation, but rather both are interwoven with the other.

Heschel described kabbalah as an outgrowth of classical rabbinic sources that describe God's dependence on man to implement the divine plan for the world. This contrasts with scholars like Gershon Scholem who saw kabbalah as reflecting the influence of non-Jewish thought. While Scholem's school focused on the metaphysics and history of kabbalistic thought, Heschel focused on kabbalistic descriptions of the human religious experience. In recent years, a growing body of kabbalah scholarship has followed Heschel's emphasis on the mystical experience of kabbalah and on its continuity with earlier Jewish sources.

== Influence outside Judaism ==
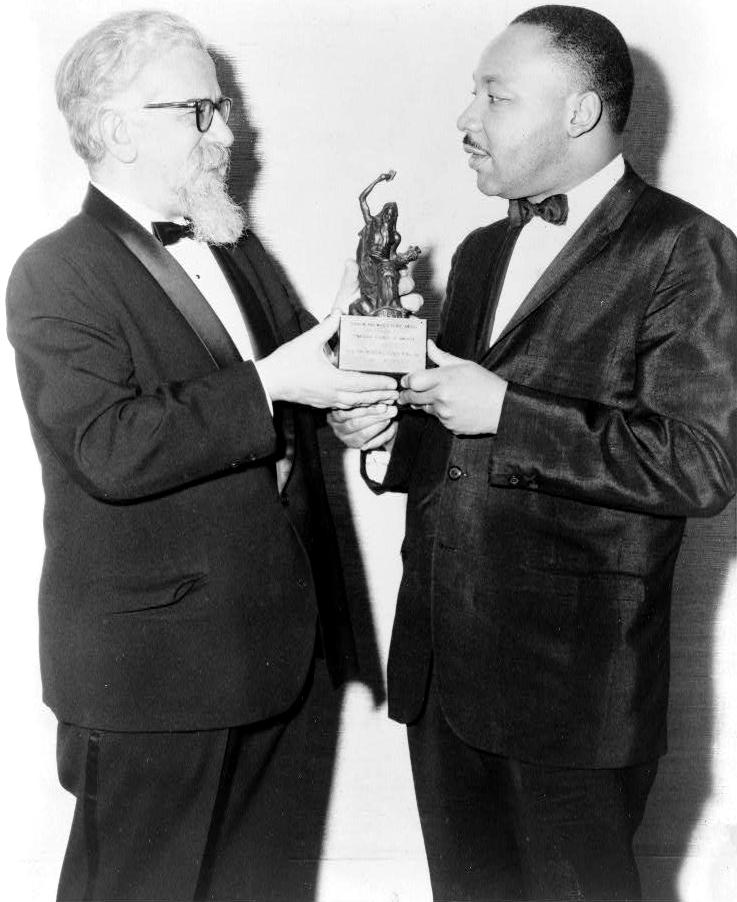
Heschel, left, presenting the Judaism and World Peace Award to Martin Luther King Jr., December 7, 1965

Heschel is a widely read Jewish theologian whose most influential works include Man Is Not Alone, God in Search of Man, The Sabbath, and The Prophets. As a representative of American Jews at the Second Vatican Council, Heschel persuaded the Catholic Church to eliminate or modify passages in its liturgy that demeaned Jews, or referred to an expected conversion of the Jewish people to Christianity. His theological works argued that religious experience is a fundamentally human impulse, not just a Jewish one. He believed that no religious community could claim a monopoly on religious truth. For these and other reasons, Martin Luther King Jr. called Heschel "a truly great prophet." Heschel actively participated in the Civil Rights movement, and was a participant in the third Selma to Montgomery march, accompanying Dr. King and John Lewis.

== Published works ==
- Der Shem Hamefoyrosh: Mentsch. [Yiddish]. Warsaw: Indzl, 1933.
- Der mizrekh-Eyropeyisher Yid (Yiddish: The Eastern European Jew). 45 p. Originally published: New York: Schocken, 1946.
- The Earth Is the Lord's: The Inner World of the Jew in Eastern Europe. 1949. ISBN 1-879045-42-7
- Man Is Not Alone: A Philosophy of Religion. 1951. ISBN 0-374-51328-7
- The Sabbath: Its Meaning for Modern Man. 1951. ISBN 1-59030-082-3
- Man's Quest for God: Studies in Prayer and Symbolism. 1954. ISBN 0-684-16829-4
- God in Search of Man: A Philosophy of Judaism. 1955. ISBN 0-374-51331-7
- The Prophets. 1962. ISBN 0-06-093699-1
- Who Is Man? 1965. ISBN 0-8047-0266-7
- Israel: An Echo of Eternity. 1969. ISBN 1-879045-70-2
- A Passion for Truth. 1973. ISBN 1-879045-41-9
- I asked for Wonder: A spiritual anthology. 1983. ISBN 0-824505-42-5
- Heavenly Torah: As Refracted Through the Generations. 2005. ISBN 0-8264-0802-8
- Torah min ha-shamayim be'aspaklariya shel ha-dorot; Theology of Ancient Judaism. [Hebrew]. 2 vols. London: Soncino Press, 1962. Third volume, New York: Jewish Theological Seminary, 1995.
- The Ineffable Name of God: Man: Poems. 2004. ISBN 0-8264-1632-2
- Kotsk: in gerangl far emesdikeyt. [Yiddish]. 2 v. (694 p.) Tel-Aviv: ha-Menorah, 1973. Added t.p.: Kotzk: the struggle for integrity (A Hebrew translation of vol. 1, Jerusalem: Magid, 2015).

=== Man Is Not Alone (1951) ===
Man Is Not Alone: A Philosophy of Religion offers Heschel's views on how people can comprehend God. Judaism views God as being radically different from humans, so Heschel explores the ways that Judaism teaches that a person may have an encounter with the ineffable. A recurring theme in this work is the radical amazement people feel when experiencing the presence of the Divine. Heschel then explores the problems of doubts and faith, what Judaism means by teaching that God is one, the essence of humanity and the problem of human needs, the definition of religion in general and Judaism in particular, and human yearning for spirituality. He offers his views as to Judaism being a pattern for life.

=== The Sabbath (1951) ===
The Sabbath: Its Meaning for Modern Man is a work on the nature and celebration of Shabbat, the Jewish Sabbath. It is rooted in the thesis that Judaism is a religion of time, not space, and that the Sabbath symbolizes the sanctification of time. For Heschel, "Technical civilization is man's conquest of space. It is a triumph frequently achieved by sacrificing an essential ingredient of existence, namely, time.” While he wrote that “to enhance our power in the world of space is our main objective,” he also warned that while “we have often suffered from degradation by poverty, now we are threatened with degradation through power."

=== God in Search of Man (1955) ===
God in Search of Man: A Philosophy of Judaism is a companion volume to Man Is Not Alone in which Heschel discusses the nature of religious thought, how thought becomes faith, and how faith creates responses in the believer. He discusses ways people can seek God's presence and the radical amazement we receive in return. He offers a criticism of nature worship, a study of humanity's metaphysical loneliness, and his view that we can consider God in search of humanity. The first section concludes with a study of Jews as a chosen people. Section two deals with the idea of revelation and what it means for one to be a prophet. This section gives us his idea of revelation as an event instead of a process. This relates to Israel's commitment to God. Section three discusses his views on how a Jew should understand the nature of Judaism as a religion. He discusses and rejects the idea that mere faith (without law) alone is enough but then cautions rabbis against adding too many restrictions to Jewish law. He discusses the need to correlate ritual observance with spirituality and love and the importance of Kavanah (intention) when performing mitzvot. He discusses religious behaviorism—when people strive for external compliance with the law, yet disregard the importance of inner devotion.

=== The Prophets (1962) ===
This work started as Heschel's PhD thesis in German, which he later expanded and translated into English. Originally published in a two-volume edition, The Prophets studies the books of the Hebrew prophets. It covers their lives and the historical context of their missions, summarizes their work, and discusses their psychological state. Heschel puts forward a central idea in his theology: that the prophetic (and, ultimately, Jewish) view of God is best understood not as anthropomorphic (that God takes human form) but as anthropopathic—that God has human feelings.

In The Prophets, Heschel describes the Jewish prophets' unique aspect compared to similar figures. Whereas other nations have soothsayers and diviners who attempt to discover the will of their gods, Heschel asserts, the Hebrew prophets are characterized by their experience of what he calls theotropism—God turning towards humanity. Heschel argues for the view of Hebrew prophets as receivers of the "Divine Pathos," of the wrath and sorrow of God over his nation that has forsaken him. In this view, prophets do not speak for God so much as they remind their audience of God's voice for the voiceless, the poor, and the oppressed.

He writes:

Prophecy is the voice that God has lent to the silent agony, a voice to the plundered poor, to the profane riches of the world. It is a form of living, a crossing point of God and man. God is raging in the prophet's words.

=== Torah min HaShamayim (1962) ===
Many consider Heschel's Torah min HaShamayim BeAspaklariya shel HaDorot, (Torah from Heaven in the mirror of the generations) to be his masterwork. The three volumes of this work are a study of classical rabbinic theology and aggadah, as opposed to halakha (Jewish law). It explores the views of the rabbis in the Mishnah, Talmud, and Midrash about the nature of Torah, the revelation of God to humankind, prophecy, and the ways that Jews have used scriptural exegesis to expand and understand these core Jewish texts. In this work, Heschel views the 2nd-century sages Rabbi Akiva and Ishmael ben Elisha as paradigms for the two dominant world-views in Jewish theology

Two Hebrew volumes were published during his lifetime by Soncino Press, and the third was published posthumously by JTS Press in the 1990s. A new edition, including an expanded third volume, due to manuscripts that were found and edited by Dr. Dror Bondi, was published by Magid Press in 2021. An English translation of all three volumes, with notes, essays, and appendices, was translated and edited by Rabbi Gordon Tucker, entitled Heavenly Torah: As Refracted Through the Generations. It can be the subject of intense study and analysis, providing insight into the relationship between God and humans beyond the world of Judaism and all monotheisms.

=== Who is Man? (1965) ===
Here, Heschel discusses the nature and role of man. In these three lectures, originally delivered in somewhat different form as The Raymond Fred West Memorial Lectures at Stanford University in May 1963, Dr. Heschel inquires into the logic of being human: What is meant by being human? What are the grounds on which to justify a human being's claim to being human? The author says, “We have never been as openmouthed and inquisitive, never as astonished and embarrassed at our ignorance about man. We know what he makes, but we do not know what he is or what to expect of him. Is it not conceivable that our entire civilization is built upon a misinterpretation of man? Or that the tragedy of man is due to the fact that he is a being who has forgotten the question: Who is Man? The failure to identify himself, to know what is authentic human existence, leads him to assume a false identity, to pretend to be what he is unable to be or to not accepting what is at the very root of his being. Ignorance about man is not lack of knowledge, but false knowledge.”

=== Prophetic Inspiration After the Prophets (1966) ===
Heschel wrote a series of articles, originally in Hebrew, on the existence of prophecy in Judaism after the destruction of the Holy Temple in Jerusalem in 70 CE. These essays were translated into English and published as Prophetic Inspiration After the Prophets: Maimonides and Others by the American Judaica publisher Ktav.

The publisher of this book states, "The standard Jewish view is that prophecy ended with the ancient prophets, somewhere early in the Second Temple era. Heschel demonstrated that this view is not altogether accurate. Belief in the possibility of continued prophetic inspiration, and belief in its actual occurrence existed throughout much of the medieval period, and it even exists in modern times. Heschel's work on prophetic inspiration in the Middle Ages originally appeared in two long Hebrew articles. In them, he concentrated on the idea that prophetic inspiration was even possible in post-Talmudic times, and, indeed, it had taken place at various schools in various times, from the Geonim to Maimonides and beyond."

== Awards and commemoration ==
1970: National Jewish Book Award in the Jewish Thought category for Israel: An Echo of Eternity

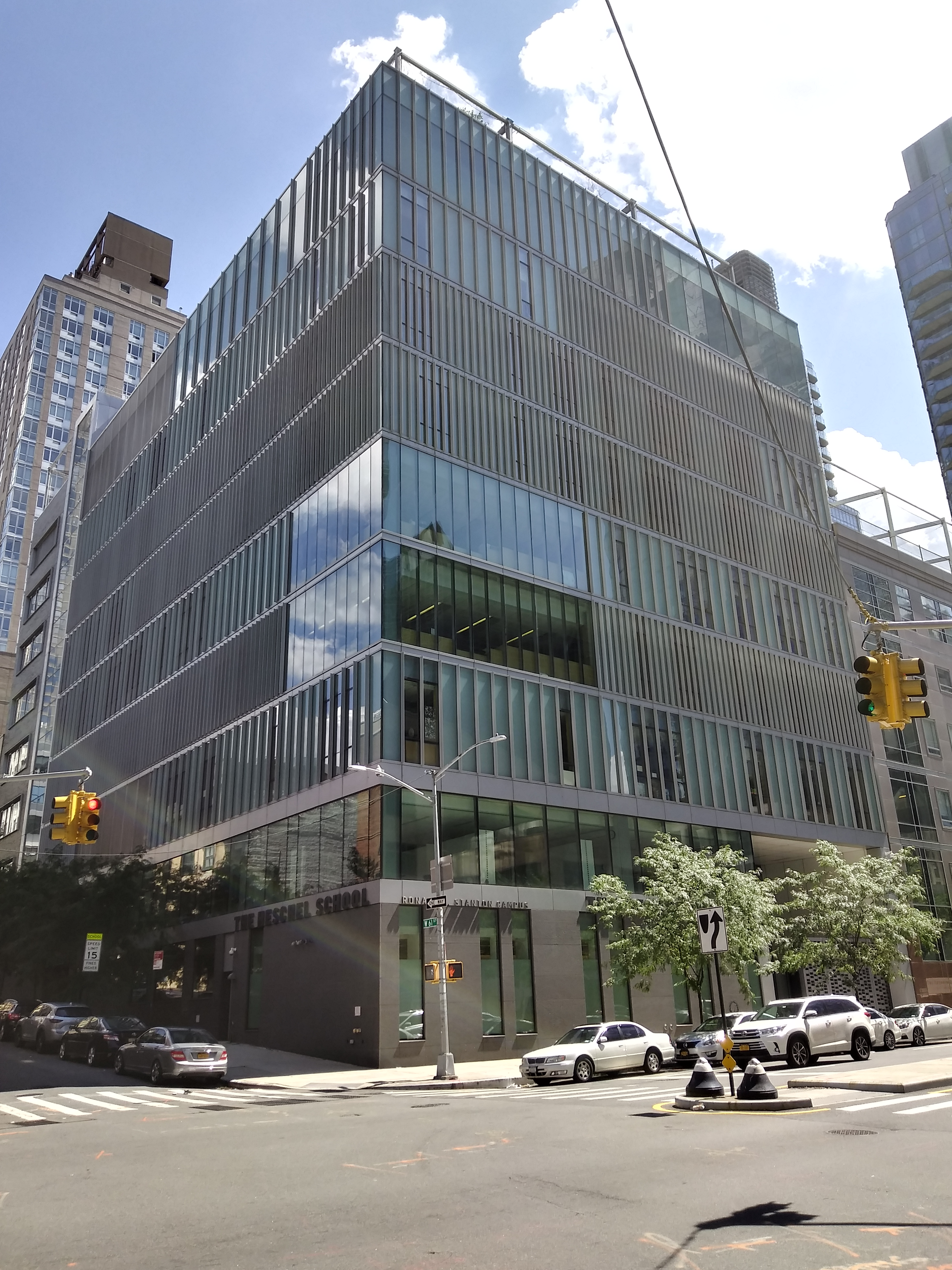
AJ Heschel School, 30 West End Ave; its adjoining building at 20 West End is partly visible at right

Five schools have been named for Heschel: in Buenos Aires, Argentina the rabbinical school of the Seminario Rabinico Latinoamericano; on the Upper West Side of New York City, the A J Heschel School; in California the Abraham Joshua Heschel Day School is located in Northridge, while the Heschel West Day School is located in Agoura Hills; and The Toronto Heschel School in Toronto, Ontario, Canada.

In 2009, a Missouri highway was named "Dr. Abraham Joshua Heschel Highway" to subvert the plans of a Springfield, Missouri-area Neo-Nazi group who cleaned the stretch of highway as part of an "Adopt-A-Highway" program. Heschel's daughter, Susannah, has objected to the adoption of her father's name in this context.

Heschel's papers are held in the Rubenstein Rare Book & Manuscript Library at Duke University.

On 17 October 2022, John Paul II Catholic University of Lublin inaugurated the Abraham J. Heschel Center for Catholic-Jewish Relations, attended by Catholic and Jewish figures, including Rabbi Abraham Skorka, Susannah Heschel, Latin Patriarch of Jerusalem Archbishop Pierbattista Pizzaballa, and Archbishop Stanisław Budzik of Lublin. Pope Francis has welcomed the establishment of the Heschel Center.

== See also ==
- List of peace activists
