= Shad Polier =

American lawyer (1906–1976)

- Born: Isadore Polier; March 18, 1906; Aiken, South Carolina
- Died: June 30, 1976 (aged 70); New York, New York
- Education: University of South Carolina
- Alma mater: Harvard Law School
- Occupations: Lawyer, civic leader
- Years active: 1931–1973
- Known for: Co-founded American Jewish Conference, International Juridical Association
- Notable work: Defended Scottsboro Boys
- Spouse: Justine Wise (m. 1937)
- Family: Stephen Samuel Wise (father-in-law)

Isadore "Shad" Polier (March 18, 1906 – June 30, 1976) was an American lawyer and civic leader who fought racial and religious discrimination in employment, education, and law enforcement.

== Early life and education ==
On March 18, 1906, Isadore Polier was born to a Jewish family in Aiken, South Carolina.

In 1926, he obtained a bachelor's degree with distinction from the University of South Carolina. In 1929, he obtained a law degree from Harvard Law School, and, in 1931, a masters of law degree. At Harvard, he studied under Felix Frankfurter. He passed the New York Bar exam in 1930.

== Career ==
Polier began to champion civil rights causes in response to lynchings in the South, starting in his hometown. In 1931, Polier prepared legal briefs on behalf of the Scottsboro Boys. That case led him to join the National Association for the Advancement of Colored People (NAACP); he served on the Executive Committee of the NAACP's Legal Defense and Educational Fund for thirty years.

At its inception in 1931, he served as executive director of the International Juridical Association, with secretary Carol Weiss King, and Joseph Kover, editor of its monthly bulletin. He met his future wife, Justine Polier, through IJA in 1932 where they both contributed to fighting against discrimination. A congressional report alleged that the National Lawyers Guild, of which Polier was a member, showed "consistent support of Communist legal cases during its entire career."

In 1934, Polier appeared before a congressional committee to recommend legislative language that would clarify the right to strike. He also began his service on the National Labor Relations Board (NLRB) as a trial counselor that same year.

In 1937, in the matter of Berman v. United States regarding mail fraud, he and Emil Weitzner supported Samuel H. Kaufman in appeal for petition against William W. Barron, US Solicitor General Stanley Forman Reed, Assistant Attorney General Brien McMahon, and W. Marvin Smith for the United States.

Polier authored a "Race Discrimination Amendment" to New York City's appropriations budget in 1942, which prohibited public funding for private childcare agencies that participated in racial discrimination.

In 1945, he became chairman of the Commission on Law and Social Action (CLSA), developed by the American Jewish Congress (which he helped to found), and served in this role until 1955. CLSA conducted legal battles against antisemitism, segregation, racism, and other discriminatory laws in order to "defend civil liberties and fight discrimination against all minority groups." He won a six-year battle against antisemitic job practices by the Arabian-American Oil Company (ARAMCO, current "Saudi Aramco").

In 1946, he prosecuted Columbia University's College of Physicians and Surgeons for discrimination in admissions policies against Jews and other minority students. That same year, he also contributed to the opening of the Northside Center for Child Development, founded by Mamie Clark and her husband. Polier prepared necessary paperwork to incorporate the Center as well as for tax exemptions pro bono. He also served as the attorney for his mother-in-law's Jewish adoption agency.

Polier advocated for the first statewide Fair Education Practices Law to end racial and religious discrimination in admissions to colleges and universities, which passed into law in 1947.

In 1948, he personally sued Metropolitan Life Insurance Company for discriminatory practices in its Stuyvesant Town Development in New York City, specifically for not admitting African-Americans. The original case was dismissed, but the American Jewish Congress (AJC), of which Polier was the vice president, continued to fight for fair housing laws.

Polier also fought against religious discrimination by representing would-be Jewish parents in civil suits to fight for the parents' rights to adopt children whose mothers were baptized as Catholics, as well as fighting against religious matching of probationers to officers.

Polier helped on the Brown vs. Board of Education case by writing amicus briefs to support student rights to obtain equal education.

== Personal life and death ==
Polier "emphasized the strong parallels between the African-American and Jewish experiences and his belief that liberty and freedom can exist only when all citizens hold equal rights."

He served the World Jewish Congress, including its Executive and Governing Council), chair of its budget and finance commission, and honorary chair of its national governing council. He also served on the boards of the Conference on Jewish Material Claims against Germany and of the Memorial Foundation for Jewish Culture.

In 1937, he married Justine Wise, daughter of Rabbi Stephen Wise and Louise Waterman Wise. He died on June 30, 1976, at his home in New York City.

Correspondence in his papers include letters exchanged with El Mehdi Ben Aboud (Ambassador of Morocco), Roy Wilkins, Thurgood Marshall, Felix Frankfurter, Hubert Humphrey, John Haynes Holmes, Martin Luther King Jr., Eleanor Roosevelt, Rabbi Stephen S. Wise, and Adlai E. Stevenson.

== See also ==
- Justine W. Polier
- W. Marvin Smith
- Scottsboro Boys
- NAACP
- American Jewish Congress
