= Congregation Baith Israel Anshei Emes =

Synagogue in New York City

Baith Israel Anshei Emes
- Hebrew: בֵּית יִשְׂרָאֵל אַנְשֵׁי אֱמֶת
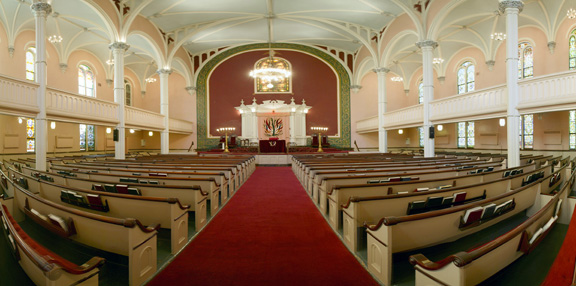
- Synagogue sanctuary

- Location in Brooklyn, New York City

Religion
- Affiliation: Conservative Judaism
- Ecclesiastical or organizational status: Synagogue
- Leadership: Rabbi Michelle Dardashti
- Status: Active

Location
- Location: 236 Kane Street, Cobble Hill, Brooklyn, New York City, New York
- Country: United States
- Interactive map of Baith Israel Anshei Emes
- Coordinates: 40°41′08″N 73°59′43″W

Architecture
- Type: Synagogue
- Style: Romanesque Revival
- Established: 1856 (as a congregation)
- Completed: 1855; 171 years ago

Specifications
- Direction of façade: North-east
- Capacity: 864 worshippers

Website
- kanestreet.org

Congregation Baith Israel Anshei Emes (Hebrew: בֵּית יִשְׂרָאֵל אַנְשֵׁי אֱמֶת, lit. 'House of Israel – People of Truth'), more commonly known as the Kane Street Synagogue, is an egalitarian Conservative synagogue at 236 Kane Street in the Cobble Hill neighborhood of Brooklyn in New York City, New York, United States. It is the oldest continuously operating synagogue in Brooklyn.

Founded as Baith Israel in 1856, the congregation constructed the first synagogue on Long Island, and hired Aaron Wise for his first rabbinical position in the United States. Early tensions between traditionalists and reformers led to the latter forming Congregation Beth Elohim, a Reform synagogue, in 1861.

The synagogue nearly failed in the early 20th century, but the 1905 hiring of Israel Goldfarb as rabbi, the purchase of its current buildings, and the 1908 merger with Talmud Torah Anshei Emes re-invigorated the congregation. The famous composer Aaron Copland celebrated his Bar Mitzvah there in 1913, and long-time Goldman Sachs head Sidney Weinberg was married there in 1920.

Membership peaked in the 1920s, but with the onset of the Great Depression declined steadily, and by the 1970s the congregation could no longer afford to heat the sanctuary. Membership has recovered since that low point; the congregation renovated its school/community center in 2004, and in 2008 embarked on a million-dollar capital campaign to renovate the sanctuary.

== 19th century ==
=== Origins ===
Twelve Bavarian, Dutch, and Portuguese Jews gathered at a private home on January 22, 1856, to discuss their "earnest desire [to] effect the incorporation of a synagogue and congregation for divine service", and in March that year they founded Congregation Baith Israel. The group had originally organized in 1855 as the United Brethren Society, a benefit society that provided members with medical and burial assistance. Hiring the Reverend M. Gershon as cantor (the person who leads the prayers), they first met in various homes, then rented space at 155 Atlantic Street, now Atlantic Avenue.

Gershon's appointment was controversial; after a background check, the board decided by a 10–9 vote on April 6, 1856, that he had never held the position of cantor in any other congregation, and was therefore not "sufficiently acquainted with the actual requirements to fill said office", and was furthermore not "a competent reader enough to read the Sepher Torah". As a result, services were led by laymen, except during the Jewish holidays, when a professional cantor would be brought in from Manhattan.

An 1886 Brooklyn Eagle article states that until the founding of Baith Israel "[h]itherto the Hebrew residents in Brooklyn had been under the necessity of finding their way across the East River in all kinds of weather, when they wished to go to their place of worship". According to synagogue legend, the founders had grown tired of rowing across the East River each Friday to celebrate Shabbat in Manhattan. Carol Levin, however, writes that a ferry service from Whitehall Street in Manhattan to South Ferry, Brooklyn (at the foot of Atlantic Street) had existed since 1836 (see South Ferry (ferry)), that the Atlantic Street synagogue's location, so close to the ferry terminus, "must have seemed convenient to many", and that "[f]erry service was fast, frequent and inexpensive ... In the year 1869 there were almost 52 million passengers." Thus, in her view, the story of the founders growing tired of rowing across the East River is a "folk tale".

=== Attempts at reform and amalgamation, construction of first synagogue ===
In the congregation's early years, tensions existed between traditionalists and reformers, and in 1861, 41 of the latter left Baith Israel to form the Congregation Beth Elohim, a Reform synagogue. That year Baith Israel hired the Reverend Joel Alexander as its religious leader. Alexander, the synagogue's first full-time rabbi, was a graduate of the Jews Seminary in Münster, and had been ordained both in Posen and by Hermann Adler, the Chief Rabbi of the United Kingdom.

In 1862, the remaining 35 members purchased two lots at the corner of State Street and Boerum Place in Boerum Hill for $3,000 (today $97,000), and on January 12 laid the cornerstone for a new building, the first synagogue built on Long Island. The building was completed on August 12, at a cost of $10,000 (today $323,000), and was consecrated on August 31 by Alexander and assembled dignitaries. The synagogue, which came to be known as the Boerum Schule, created a Sunday school soon afterwards, the first in Brooklyn, and at the time, an innovation. The school was free, and run by volunteers, with separate classes for boys and girls. By 1890 the school had 160 students, and at its peak the school had 500 pupils.

In 1869 reformers again left Baith Israel, and, joining with dissenters from Kahal Kodesh Beth Elohim of Williamsburg, founded Temple Israel. Though many reformers had left the congregation, several reforms in the service were nonetheless introduced: the congregation abolished most piyyutim and the Priestly Blessing, and, in 1873, introduced a confirmation ceremony for girls, led by the Reverend Dr. Tinter. The confirmation ceremonies, which had initially been held during the holiday of Sukkot, were eventually moved to the holiday of Shavuot (the holiday during which the Reform movement held these ceremonies), and continued for both boys and girls (in place of Bar and Bat Mitzvah celebrations) until the 1940s.

Aaron Wise, father of Stephen Samuel Wise, was one of the synagogue's earliest rabbis, from 1874 to 1875. This was his first rabbinical position in the United States, before moving to Congregation Rodeph Sholom in Manhattan.

=== Building renovations, failed mergers, traditionalism ===
In 1876, the congregation voted by a margin of over two to one to re-orient the synagogue pews in the manner of Christian churches, and introduce mixed seating. However, nothing was done about this until 1879, when the renovations were carried out: the front pews were removed, the side pews extended to the walls, and the vestibule moved outside the sanctuary. Led by rabbi Dr. E. M. Myers, the synagogue was re-dedicated on September 7.

In April 1883, Baith Israel, Beth Elohim, and Temple Israel, Brooklyn's three leading synagogues, tried to merge; Beth Elohim and Temple Israel had both been formed in the 1860s by dissenters from Baith Israel. This was the third such attempt; the previous two had failed when the members could not agree on synagogue ritual. The combined congregation, which would purchase new premises, would have 150 members (only heads of households were considered members at that time). Members would be refunded half the purchase price of the pews in their existing buildings. The rabbis of Beth Elohim and Temple Israel were to split the offices of rabbi and cantor: Baith Israel, at the time, had no rabbi. Though this attempt also failed, in the following year the three congregations carried out combined activities, including a picnic and a celebration of the 100th birthday of Sir Moses Montefiore.

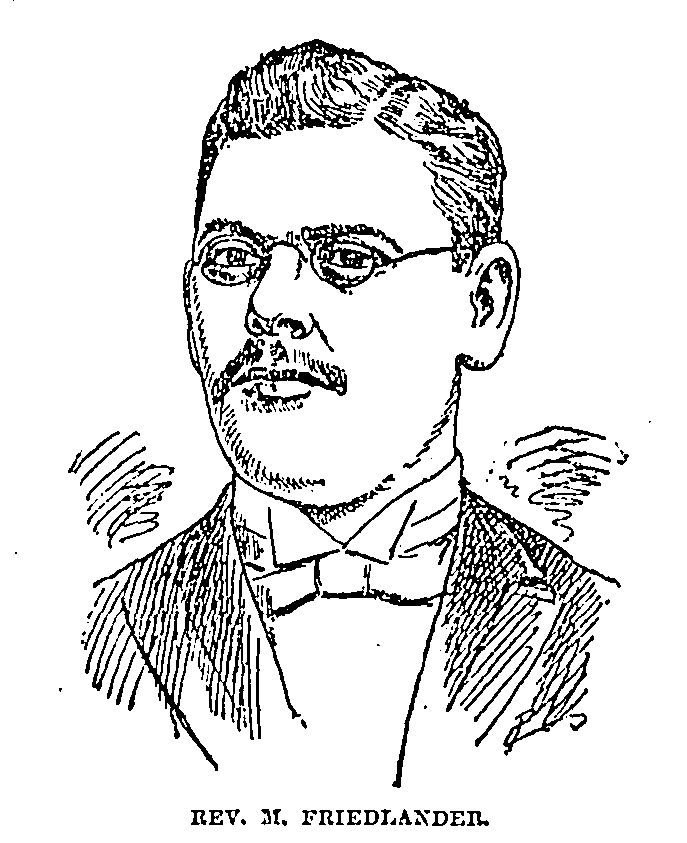
Marcus Friedlander in 1891

Baith Israel hired Marcus Friedlander as rabbi in 1887. Born in Congress Poland in 1862, he left Russia for England before he was twenty. Though speaking little English at the time, he graduated there from the London Theological Seminary, before emigrating to the United States. He was 24 years old when he assumed the post at Baith Israel, at the time the youngest man in New York state to be appointed to so significant a position of Jewish leadership. Friedlander served until 1893, when he resigned to take a more lucrative position in California at the First Hebrew Congregation of Oakland. After Friedlander left, his name was, for reasons unknown, deleted from the synagogue histories, and the financial records and minute books dating from his tenure were removed from Baith Israel's archives. He was succeeded by Joseph Taubenhaus, the brother of Dr. Gottheil/Godfrey Taubenhaus, the rabbi of Congregation Beth Elohim; another brother, Jacob/Jean Taubenhaus was a famous French chess master.

In 1889, the congregation again renovated the synagogue building, repairing it and replacing the roof, increasing the seating capacity, adding a new vestibule and double entrance way, and redecorating the interior. At that time over half of the congregants still spoke German as their native language. The congregation had 50 members—defined as "heads of families who own seats"—by 1891, and 300 congregants in total. By 1900, the congregation had 160 members, and the congregational school, which held classes for two hours once a week, had ten teachers and 150 students.

Though the synagogue had undertaken innovations in some areas of Jewish law, it still insisted on strict adherence in others. In 1878 Tinter was dismissed for officiating at the marriage of a Jewish woman and Christian man, and Baith Israel was, for a time, the only congregation in Brooklyn that celebrated Jewish holidays for the traditional two days. In 1889 Baith Israel asserted it was "the only orthodox congregation in the city", and that year the board forced the resignation of a Mr. J. Folkart, for transgressing the laws of Yom Kippur. In 1892, when Hyman Rosenberg was expelled as rabbi of Brooklyn's Beth Jacob synagogue for eating ham, the Brooklyn Eagle canvassed local rabbis for their views on the matter. While George Taubenhaus, rabbi of Beth Elohim stated, "I do not believe my congregation would expel me if I ate ham", Baith Israel's rabbi Friedlander responded, "While there are some differences between the reform and orthodox Jews, I do not think it is the place for any Jewish minister to eat ham. The reformers do not so strictly observe the old Mosaic law, but it does not seem to me a good example for a rabbi to set to his congregation."

== 20th century ==
=== Decline and reinvigoration ===
By 1904, membership had fallen to 30, and the synagogue nearly failed: mass transit had allowed Jews to migrate away from downtown Brooklyn, and a fire had nearly destroyed the Boerum synagogue building. Further innovations were attempted, including a pipe organ and a mixed-sex choir, but these were removed after objections from Orthodox members. The congregation decided that the Boerum location was part of the problem, and made the bold decision to sell it, buy new premises, and hire a rabbi (the synagogue had, for many years, run without one). In 1905, they hired Israel Goldfarb, a 1902 graduate of the Jewish Theological Seminary, as "Hazan [cantor] and Teacher", his first and only pulpit. The following year Goldfarb was appointed rabbi, a position he would hold for over 50 years.

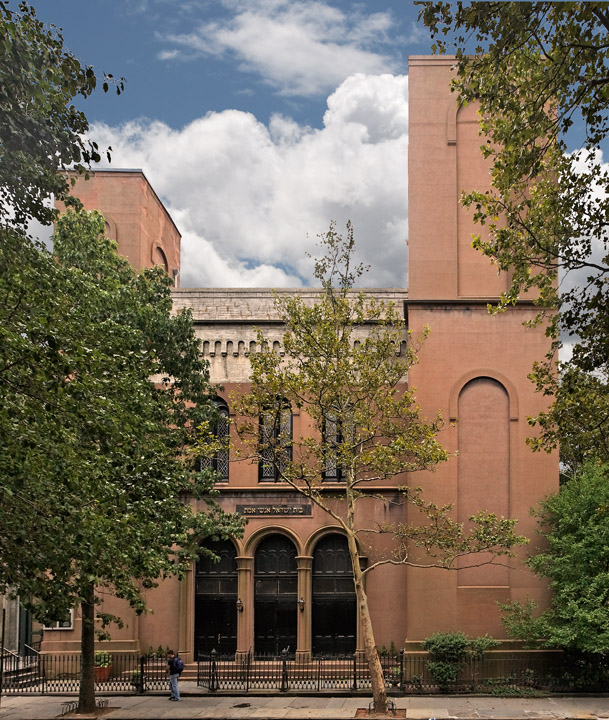
Kane Street synagogue exterior.

In 1905, the congregation also purchased for $30,000 (today $1,070,000) its current building at Tompkins Place and Harrison Street (renamed Kane Street in 1928), along with an adjacent school building and a connecting two-story arcade. The Romanesque revival church building, erected in 1855, had originally housed the Middle Dutch Reformed Church, and, from 1887, the Trinity German Lutheran Church. The hiring of Goldfarb and purchase of a new building helped revive the congregation, and by 1906 (its 50th anniversary) membership had doubled.

Goldfarb was a talented musician, known to this day as composer of popular tunes for the songs "Shalom Aleichem" and "Magein Avot" used in most Ashkenazi synagogues. With his brother Samuel E. Goldfarb, he compiled The Jewish Songster for schoolchildren, the first American collection of Jewish songs. Israel Goldfarb also served as Professor of Liturgical Music at the Jewish Theological Seminary from 1920 to 1944, and in 1949 founded the School of Sacred Music at Hebrew Union College.

In his Kol Nidre sermon of 1905, Goldfarb emphasized the need for a Talmud Torah (providing inexpensive Jewish education for primary school children), and it was immediately founded. Talmud Torahs helped synagogues in neighborhoods with small Jewish populations to attract young Jewish families, and were common in "second-settlement areas of New York City such as Harlem and Brooklyn". By 1907–1908 the congregation had grown to 85 member families. The Talmud Torah, which held classes four days a week, had three teachers and 75 students.

=== Merger with Talmud Torah Anshei Emes and growth ===
In 1908, Baith Israel merged with Degraw Street's Talmud Torah Anshei Emes Synagogue, a growing congregation that had become too large for the row house in which it held services. Talmud Torah Anshei Emes's membership was mostly made up of Eastern European Jews, who were stricter in their observances than Baith Israel's mostly German-origin membership; to accommodate them, a special all-men section of pews was designated at the front left of the sanctuary.

The merged congregations adopted the current name, a combination of the two previous names, and, with the assistance and encouragement of Goldfarb and synagogue president Harris Copland founded a sisterhood. Nevertheless, the combined membership was still not large; in 1911, the year the congregation renovated the recently acquired synagogue building, the Talmud Torah had only 45 students, 10 of them the children of non-members.

The sisterhood had grown to 42 members by 1913; that year 11 men were accepted as new congregants, including "a dentist, an optician, a druggist, a lawyer, a butler and two store owners and a roofer"—in general, middle class occupations. Baith Israel Anshei Emes also became one of the charter members of the United Synagogue of Conservative Judaism in 1913, with Michael Salit, who had been synagogue president in 1906, serving as the congregation's delegate, and he, Rabbi Goldfarb and another synagogue member, Isaac Applebaum, were among the 22 individuals who initially founded the organization.

Aaron Copland celebrated his Bar Mitzvah at Baith Israel Anshei Emes in 1913. The Copland family was active in the synagogue; his father Harris became treasurer and chairman of the Talmud Torah in 1905, had helped purchase the current building, served as president of the congregation from 1907 to 1910, and was made a life trustee in 1936. Aaron's brother Ralph served as superintendent of the Sunday School. Goldfarb was instrumental in assisting Aaron Copland in his early musical career. While still in high school, Aaron had approached Goldfarb for his support in studying music: Aaron's father wanted him to enter the legal profession. Goldfarb engineered an agreement whereby Aaron would study music for two or three years, and, if that did not work out, then study law. In his memoirs, Copland would later describe Goldfarb as "a composer of liturgical music and the possessor of a fine baritone voice ... a sensitive human being and an effective leader of the congregation".

By 1916, the congregation had installed 10 stained glass windows, electric lighting, a new pulpit, and two large bronze menorahs, and employed six people. Dues were $12 (today $360) per year, and Sunday school fees were $0.02 (today $0.590) per session. Membership had grown to 140 families by 1919. The congregational school held classes daily, and had 400 students and 20 teachers.

Sidney Weinberg, who rose from the job of assistant porter to head Goldman Sachs from 1930 to 1969, was married at Baith Israel Anshei Emes in 1920. The Weinberg family, which had joined the synagogue when it was still on Beorum Place, was also very active in the synagogue; Sidney's mother, Sophie, was sisterhood president from 1912 to 1913, and his father, Pincus, served as president from 1919 to 1921, and the children all attended the Sunday school and Talmud Torah. The Weinbergs subsequently moved to Flatbush, where in 1924 Pincus became the first president of the East Midwood Jewish Center.

In 1924, a fire almost destroyed the upper level of the school building, but the congregation repaired the damage. Another renovation was begun in 1928, and included installing illuminated stained glass over the ark and bronze memorial tablets at the rear of the sanctuary, and repainting the sanctuary walls and columns in a trompe-l'œil manner imitating Jerusalem stone and marble.

=== Great Depression and post-World War II decline ===
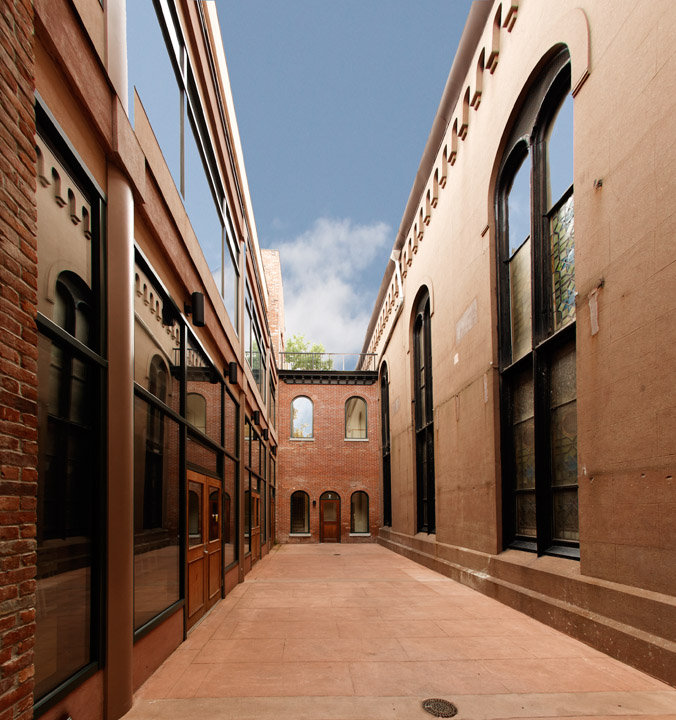
Synagogue courtyard.

On its 75th anniversary in 1931, the congregation received a congratulatory message from President Herbert Hoover. Additional congratulatory messages arrived from Governor (later President) Franklin D. Roosevelt, Lieutenant Governor Herbert H. Lehman, Mayor Jimmy Walker, and Felix M. Warburg. Nevertheless, the Great Depression brought difficult times; officers were no longer paid their salaries, and were informed in 1932 that they would have to "wait indefinitely" to receive their back wages. In 1933, the synagogue abolished fixed wages entirely for its employees, and instead paid them on a "month-to-month basis", depending on what the congregation could afford.

In 1932 women were allowed to join the choir. In deference to traditionalists, however, the choir was moved to the organ loft, so that the women would be less visible.

In the late 1940s and early 1950s, Herman Belth raised $20,000 (today $270,000) and contributed another $20,000 for another renovation of the synagogue. The building was fortified, the interior (except the front wall) repainted, and the exterior brick walls, which had been clad in "blue-veined white stone", were refinished with "brownstone type stuccoed slabs". When the renovations were complete, the synagogue was re-dedicated in January 1953. Despite Belth's efforts, membership continued to decline, as congregants moved to the suburbs. Though the Centennial Celebrations of 1956 "provided a brief burst of energy for the Congregation and produced funds to maintain the Synagogue", during this period the choir was disbanded, the Sunday School and Talmud Torah closed, and paid staff reduced.

In the 1960s, following Goldfarb's retirement, the synagogue hired a series of part-time rabbis, including Goldfarb's grandson, Henry D. Michelman, who served as rabbi from 1967 to 1971. Michelman, who would later become the Executive Vice President of the Synagogue Council of America, was, like his grandfather, a talented musician, composing music for synagogues and churches, writing scores for television films for ABC, A&E, CNBC, and PBS, and serving as Chairman of the American Society of Jewish Music.

The membership decline continued in the late 1960s and early 1970s, as older congregants died and moved away, and dwindled to the point where the congregation could no longer afford to heat the sanctuary, and thought they would have to disband. Nevertheless, in 1972 the congregation established a nursery school and prozdor (high school).

=== Rebirth: 1980s and 1990s ===
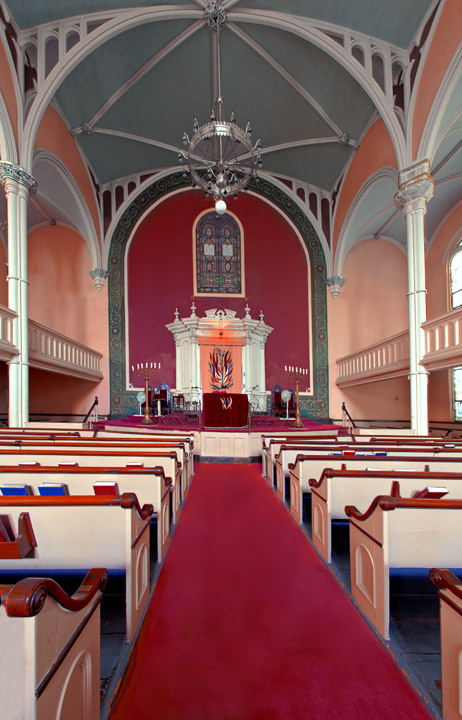
Sanctuary interior.

Changing demographics and new synagogue programs helped the congregation recover from its low point in the 1970s. In 1979, Raymond Scheindlin, a Ph.D. in Arabic literature from Columbia University, and professor of medieval Hebrew poetry at the Jewish Theological Seminary of America (JTSA), became the part-time rabbi of the congregation, replacing Howard Gorin, who had served since 1976. Scheindlin had become a member in 1974, after joining the faculty of the JTSA and moving to Brooklyn Heights, and from that point on read the Torah every week and served as cantor. He also encouraged the re-constitution of a choir, which called itself "the DeRossi Singers" after Salamone DeRossi, the leading Jewish composer of the late Italian Renaissance, whose works the choir sang. Even after leaving the synagogue, Scheindlin continued to return to serve as cantor for the High Holidays every year until 2016.

In 1982 Scheindlin stated that the membership had grown to the point where it again required the services of a full-time rabbi, and the congregation hired Jonathan Ginsburg as its first full-time rabbi since Israel Goldfarb's retirement. Ginsburg developed adult education and young singles programs, and improved standards in the synagogue's children's education programs. Geoffrey Goldberg followed him as rabbi from 1987 to 1988.

In 1994 the buildings' stained glass windows, parapet tower, and brownstone were repaired, landscaping redone, and, with a grant from the Sol Goldman Charitable trust, the bimah and vestibule were refurbished. Membership had increased to almost 200 families by 1995, and in 1996 Samuel H. Weintraub was hired as rabbi.

=== Increasing involvement of women ===
In 1961 the synagogue began granting women some pulpit honors, giving the Sisterhood President gelila, and in 1966 granting married couples hagbaha and gelila (the honors of lifting and re-wrapping the Torah after it has been read). In the 1970s, women became more involved in the synagogue's political and religious activities: in 1972, the first woman was elected to the board of trustees, and in 1975, the congregation began calling women to the Torah and counting women in the minyan, the latter just two years after the Committee on Jewish Law and Standards of the Rabbinical Assembly voted nine to four in favor of this innovation.

In 1980, Nancy Fink, a Brooklyn Law School professor, was elected as the congregation's first female president. Fink called a full membership meeting in 1982 to decide whether women could lead the services, blow the shofar (the rams-horn trumpet blown on the High Holidays), and whether daughters of kohanim (hereditary priests) could give the priestly blessing. Advised by Scheindlin, the congregation decided to make the services fully egalitarian, allowing women to perform all three functions.

Baith Israel Anshei Emes' move to egalitarianism culminated in August 1988, when Debra Cantor was hired as its first female rabbi, making it the first synagogue in the Northeastern United States to be led by a woman. Cantor, who was 33 at the time, had been valedictorian of that year's graduating class at the Jewish Theological Seminary. The decision was not accepted by all congregants; the Conservative movement had ordained its first female rabbi, Amy Eilberg, only three years before, in 1985, and following Cantor's appointment a number of families left the synagogue to form B'nai Avraham, an Orthodox congregation in Brooklyn Heights.

== 21st century ==
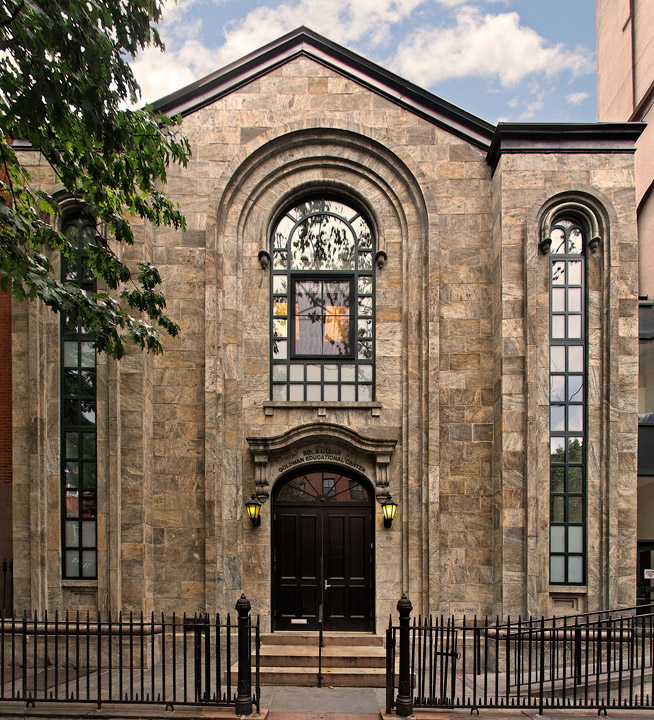
Sol and Lillian Goldman Education Center.

In 2002 Congregation Baith Israel Anshei Emes received a $1 million grant for building renovations from Lillian Goldman, just weeks before her death; she had previously donated $20 million for the reconstruction and expansion of Yale Law School's library, and $5 million to Manhattan's 92nd Street Y for a family center there. After raising over $2 million more, including a $54,000 grant from the Jewish Communal Fund, in 2003 the congregation began re-building the three-story school/community center from the ground up, leaving only the historic facade. In 2004 the building was re-opened as the "Sol and Lillian Goldman Education Center", and a day-time pre-school launched. Though the sanctuary also needed extensive repairs, the renovations of the school/community center were undertaken first because the congregation decided "a venue for social functions is at the heart of every cohesive religious group". The following year, the school received a $25,000 grant from the Edith Glick Shoolman Children's Foundation "[t]o assist in the development of the Kane Street Kids program for preschool age children housed in the Congregation's Early Childhood Center".

Nearly 300 households were members by 2006, and in the same year, the New York State Office of Parks, Recreation and Historic Preservation awarded the synagogue a grant of $350,000 for exterior restoration of the sanctuary. The grant was part of a million-dollar capital campaign that the membership intended to carry out in 2008, as the synagogue building still required extensive repairs: the roof leaked, causing interior damage, and (along with the gutters) needed to be replaced; interior columns were taped to prevent plaster from falling off them; the sanctuary doors needed to be replaced; and the stained glass windows needed to be removed, the metal holding them repaired, and their wooden framing replaced. In 2007 the New York Landmarks Conservancy's Sacred Sites Program awarded Congregation Baith Israel Anshei Emes grants totaling $17,500, for copper roof and masonry restoration.

In 2008, the synagogue filed documents with the New York Department of State, and was approved to officially use the name "Kane Street Synagogue," which had been its commonly used name for several decades at that point.

The congregation had been supportive of the LGBTQ+ community since at least the early 1990s, and following the late 2006 decision by the Committee on Jewish Law and Standards to allow same-sex commitment ceremonies, in 2007 Kane Street Synagogue voted to follow suit. The day before Yom Kippur, 2009, the synagogue was picketed by members of the Westboro Baptist Church, who shouted antisemitic and anti-gay slogans.

The congregation was led by now Rabbi Emeritus, Samuel H. Weintraub from 1996 to 2021. He was succeeded by Interim Senior Rabbi Paul. F. Resnick. Rabbi Michelle Dardashti was elected as head rabbi by the congregation in March 2022, and officially assumed her role on August 1 of that year.

Congregation Baith Israel Anshei Emes continues to be the oldest continuously operating synagogue in Brooklyn.
