= Rabbi Wise =

Rabbi Wise may refer to:

- Aaron Wise (rabbi) (1844-1896), American Conservative rabbi
- Isaac Mayer Wise (1819-1900), American Reform rabbi and author
- Jonah Wise (1881-1959), American rabbi and leader of the Reform Judaism movement
- Stephen Samuel Wise (1874–1949), American Reform rabbi and Zionist
