= Gertrude Lightstone Mittelmann =

American concert pianist

- Gertrude Lightstone Mittelmann, c. 1930
- Born: Gertrude Lightstone; February 8, 1907; New York City
- Died: October 25, 1956 (aged 49); Manhattan, New York, NY
- Resting place: Washington Cemetery, Brooklyn, New York
- Education: Classical piano
- Known for: Concert pianist, radio host
- Movement: Classical music
- Awards: Mothers Award for Human Relations (American Mothers Committee, 11 May 1951), Congress House Dedication (Stephen Wise Free Synagogue)

Gertrude Lightstone Mittelmann, also Gertrude Mittelmann, and Mrs. Jesse Mittelmann (8 February 1907 – 25 October 1956, New York City), was an American concert pianist, among the first women pianists of Jewish descent to have an international concert career. The daughter of a prominent New York surgeon, Dr. Abraham (Albert) Lightstone (1874–1955), she was one of the first women radio show hosts, notably at WQXR-AM 1550 KC (Interstate Broadcasting Company). She gave one of her first American concerts at Haddon Hall in 1928. Vinyl and metal record albums were recorded of her performances as a symphonic concert pianist for various orchestras and recitals as a solo artist. In addition, many of her broadcasts as a radio host were recorded on record albums. She participated in numerous cultural and community activities.

== Early life and career ==
=== Education and marriage ===
Gertrude Lightstone, daughter of Abraham Lightstone and Dorothy Goldstein Lightstone, studied classical piano, both in New York and Germany, with Carl Friedberg, New York Institute of Musical Art (the institution that would later become the Juilliard School of Music), between 1930 and 1935. In 1931, after suffering an injury to his finger, Carl Friedberg was treated by Dr. Lightstone.

In 1931 Gertrude Lightstone married Jesse Mittelmann, a businessman and first cousin of the journalist, theatre columnist and film producer Mark Hellinger. Thereafter she would be known as Gertrude Mittelmann, or Gertrude Lightstone Mittelmann. Their first child, Michael Mittelmann, was born in October 1932. Her second son Douglas (David) was born in July 1934.

=== First performance ===
Gertrude Lightstone Mittelmann was among the first women pianists of Jewish descent to have an international concert career. Others included Fannie Bloomfield Zeisler (1863–1927), Nadia Reisenberg (1904–1983), and Rosalyn Tureck (1913–2003). Gertrude Lightstone performed in the Vernon Room of Haddon Hall on Saturday 21 April 1928, marking the debut of her career on the concert platform. Her opening group listed a Prelude and Fugue by Bach and Scarlatti's Pastorale and Capriccio. Then came a Prelude and Etude of Chopin and Brahms' Intermezzo and Rhapsodie. Bringing the program to a close, Lightstone played pieces by Debussy, Godowsky and Liszt's Rhapsodie No. 13. "Miss Lightstone's manner and the stage" wrote critic George R. Weintraub, "in its simplicity and dignity and unassuming naturalness, is entirely in her favor… she seemed to have enjoyed preparing the music for her program and played it as if others were to enjoy it, too".

=== Radio performances ===
Gertrude Lightstone Mittelmann playing the piano with children, c.1940

Lightstone made her debut in radio when featured in "Works of Great Composers" broadcast through the WNBC (AM). On 29 December 1929 she played piano with the Roxy Symphony Orchestra on WJZ radio station (announcer Milton J. Cross). The performance included the First Movement from the Rubinstein Piano Concerto in D Minor and the Symphony No. 4 by Tchaikovsky.

On 9 May 1931 she was featured again of WJZ, performing Prelude in F minor, Prelude in F major and Mazurkas by Chopin, Intermezzo by Brahms, Eccentrique by Debussy and Polichinelle by Sergei Rachmaninoff. In March 1933 she played piano on WEAF radio.

Gertrude Mittelmann played six numbers over WJZ on Saturday 5 August 1933.

She was featured on WOR (at 8:00 PM) as piano soloist with the Philip James Symphony Orchestra (also called the Little Symphonie Orchestra), conducted by Philip James, interpreting the allegro of Beethoven's Concerto in C minor. She performed as a guest artist on WOR 21 December 1933 (at 6 PM).

On 14 February 1935 (8 - 9 PM) Gertrude Mittelmann was featured again on WOR performing with the Philip James Symphony Orchestra, interpreting the Overture 'Abu Hassan' by Weber; Piano Concerto in D minor by Mozart; Tone Poem 'Don Juan', Opus 20 by R. Strauss; Minuet by Boccherini; and Suite 'The Crown of India' by Elgar. On another occasion at WOR with the Symphony Orchestra she performed the Cesar Franck Variations Symphoniques for Piano and Orchestra.

On Tuesday 9 July 1935 Mittelmann played piano with the Little Symphony. The performance, broadcast on WOR (8 PM), included Overture, 'The Nuremberg Doll' by Adolphe Adam; Siegfried Idyll by Wagner; Slavonic Dance No. 15 by Dvořák; and Patrie 'Dramatic Overture' by Bizet.

In 1935 for her first appearance on WQXR (called W2XR until 1936) Mittelmann, performing with String Classics, directed by Eddy Brown, interpreted Concerto Grosso, No. 9 by Corelli, and Concerto No. 1 in G minor (piano and strings) by Mendelssohn. Performing solo on WQXR, Gertrude Mittelmann played Hopak by Moussorgsky; Étincelles by Moszkowski; Polichinelle by Rachmaninoff; and Suite for strings by Purcell.

== Radio and performing arts ==
=== Dancing Through the Ages ===
In 1939, Gertrude Mittelmann created a program entitled Dancing Through the Ages performed live at the MacDowell Club, 166 East Seventy-third Street in New York City, on Sundays at 4 PM: 3 December 1939, 14 January, 4 February, 10 March and 7 April 1940. The event, a series of five concerts for young people sponsored by Junior Programs, Inc., was devoted to dance music by great composers of various periods. Season tickets good for all performances were sold for a cost of five dollars. As during the radio broadcasts, Gertrude Mittelmann played piano and narrated stories connected with music and associated dances. Unlike the radio show, each program included a dance performed in the costume of the period. Mittelmann's guests included Jane Kerley and her dance group; Westley Sontag and his Mozart String Sinfonietta (with Mittelmann as concert pianist); and fourteen-year-old flute soloist Gioia Labate, daughter of Bruno Labate (first oboist of the New York Philharmonic-Symphony Orchestra).

=== WQXR, Come Dance Through the Ages ===
Gertrude Lightstone Mittelmann and children from the Ethical Culture Summer Play School dance at WQXR classical salon on Fifth Ave. PM (newspaper), Monday 15 July 1940

In 1940, Gertrude Mittelmann was hired by WQXR radio station in New York City where she created an adaptation of her live performances entitled Come Dance Through the Ages. The broadcasts were aired on Thursday's at 6:30 PM and Friday's from 11:15 to 11:45 AM. The program traced the history of the dance form, through music, extending from the pre-classic period to the present, covering dances of all nations.

Mittelmann's "original program" was "radio's newest novelty" according to a WQXR announcer, "a folksy dancy program jammed full of music for the simple restful pleasure of just sitting around and listening to dancing". "We take our title seriously, for every time we get together we hope you'll not only listen but join in. Just take your partner's arm with spritely step and promenade all".

The new program ethered by WQXR, Come Dance Through the Ages, taught folk-dancing over the air. Friday 12 July 1940, at WQXR's classical salon on Fifth Avenue, girls from the Ethical Culture Summer Play School (Central Park West) "twirled and curtsied through a repertory of country dances, hornpipes and drop-the-handkerchiefs. At the other end of radio receivers, dance groups in less-privileged ends of town paced the same measures, following instruction given from the studio". This series played each Friday on WQXR from 12 July through 16 August, teaching a selection of folk dances from the 15th century to the hot-cha of 1940. Music was interpreted by Mittelmann at the piano or via recordings, with oral explanations of the different dances given by Mittelmann, in collaboration with Sadie Gassen as dance director for the first program. The dances were instructed over the air, while actually being danced in the WQXR studio by groups of children.

On Sunday evenings from 7 to 8 PM, 20 March and 29 May 1940, WQXR presented Gertrude Mittelmann performing as piano soloist with Eddy Brown and the String Orchestra.

Through the summer, Mittelmann's Come, Dance Through the Ages was presented on WQXR in co-operation with the Board of Education Summer Play Schools and Summer Demonstration Schools of Teachers College. The broadcasts took place on Friday's at 11:15, "tracing dancing from its most primitive forms down through the ages to the present".

Gertrude Mittelmann loves to dance. One night, while listening to some ballet music at the Metropolitan Opera House, she was so carried away by the melody that she sprang to her feet and executed some dance steps which, she said, "must have looked awfully queer. But everyone should dance when they hear music they like," she said today in her duplex apartment at 829 Park Ave. "Dancing is the finest possible outlet for emotions. You can feel it. You know something's happening."

Miss Mittelmann, a concert pianist, was discussing the "join-in" group-dancing radio series, "Come Dance Through the Ages," she is presenting over station WQXR. It is the first time, she said, that young people have been instructed in the dance over the air.

The program, Mittelmann's "brain-child", was arranged with numerous co-operating agencies: the Board of Education Summer Play Schools, the Summer Demonstration School of Teachers College, Columbia University, settlement houses and Girl Scout troops, who performed dances as outlined by an instructor, where representative groups went through the dances in the WQXR studios.

== Commemoration ==
- An oil on canvas portrait of Gertrude Lightstone Mittelmann was painted by the artist Moïse Kisling in 1945.
- Gertrude Lightstone Mittelmann was also the subject of a painting by Louise Waterman Wise (1874–1947) in 1928. Waterman Wise was a Jewish activist and wife of World Jewish Congress President Stephen Samuel Wise.
- A portrait of her father, Abraham Lightstone, M.D., had been painted by the Mexican artist Diego Rivera in 1941.
