= Aaron Wise =

Aaron Wise may refer to:

- Aaron Wise (rabbi) (1844–1896), American rabbi
- Aaron Wise (golfer) (born 1996), American professional golfer
