= Johannes Buxtorf =

German Calvinist theologian (1564–1629)

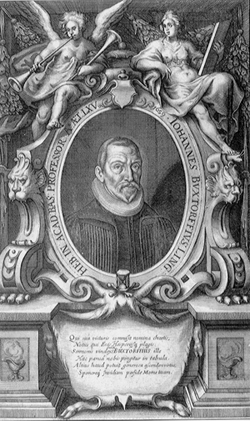
Johannes Buxtorf

Johannes Buxtorf (Latin: Johannes Buxtorfius) (December 25, 1564 – September 13, 1629) was a celebrated Hebraist, member of a family of Orientalists; professor of Hebrew for thirty-nine years at Basel and was sometimes informally styled magister rabbinorum, or "Master of the Rabbis", by early modern European authors such as Edward Pococke and Johann Christoph Wolf. His massive tome, De Synagoga Judaica (1st. ed. 1603), scrupulously documents the customs and society of German Jewry in the early modern period.

Buxtorf was the father of Johannes Buxtorf the Younger.

== Life ==
Buxtorf was born at Kamen in Westphalia. The original form of the name was Bockstrop, or Boxtrop, from which was derived the family crest, which bore the figure of a goat (German Bock, he-goat). After the death of his father, who was minister of Kamen, Buxtorf studied at Marburg and the newly founded Herborn Academy, at the latter of which Caspar Olevian (1536–1587) and Johannes Piscator (1546–1625) had been appointed professors of theology. At a later date Piscator received the assistance of Buxtorf in the preparation of his Latin translation of the Old Testament, published at Herborn in 1602–1603. From Herborn Buxtorf went to Heidelberg, and thence to Basel, attracted by the reputation of Johann Jakob Grynaeus and J. G. Hospinian (1515–1575).

After a short residence at Basel, he studied successively under Heinrich Bullinger (1504–1575) at Zürich and Theodore Beza at Geneva. On his return to Basel, Grynaeus, desirous that the services of so promising a scholar should be secured to the university, procured him a situation as tutor in the family of Leo Curio, son of Celio Secondo Curione, well known for his sufferings on account of the Reformed faith. At the insistence of Grynaeus, Buxtorf undertook the duties of the Hebrew chair in the university, and discharged them for two years with such ability that at the end of that time he was unanimously appointed to the vacant office. From this date (1591) to his death in 1629 he remained in Basel, and devoted himself with remarkable zeal to the study of Hebrew and rabbinic literature. He received into his house many learned Jews, that he might discuss his difficulties with them, and he was frequently consulted by Jews themselves on matters relating to their ceremonial law. His partiality for Jewish society brought him, indeed, on one occasion into trouble with the authorities of the city, the laws against the Jews being very strict. Nevertheless, on the whole, his relations with the city of Basel were friendly. He remained firmly attached to the university which first recognized his merits, and declined two invitations from the University of Leiden and Academy of Saumur successively. His correspondence with the most distinguished scholars of the day was very extensive; the library of the university of Basel contains a rich collection of letters, which are valuable for a literary history of the time.

=== Works ===
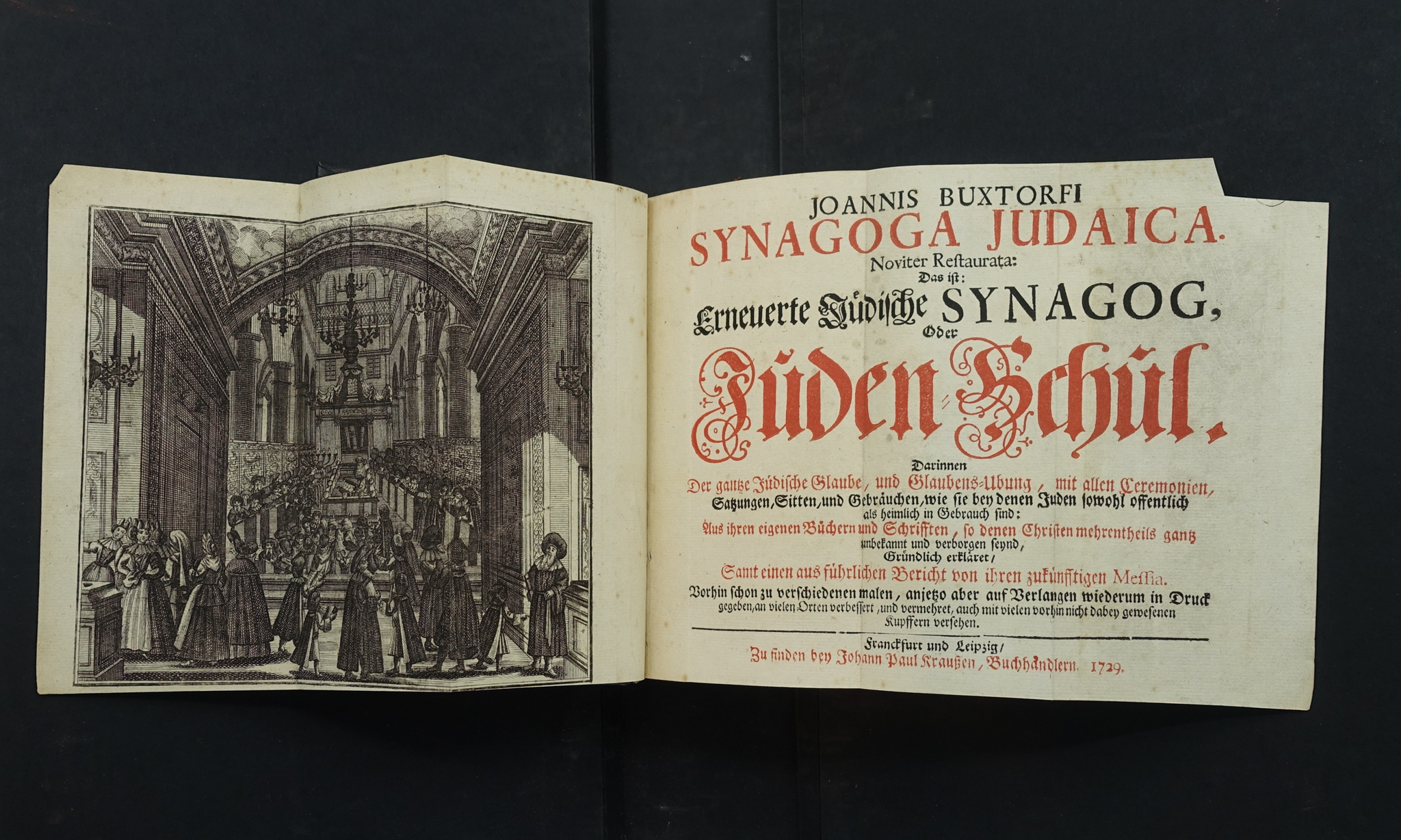
Title page of the 1729 edition of Synagoga Judaica, in the Jewish Museum of Switzerland's collection.

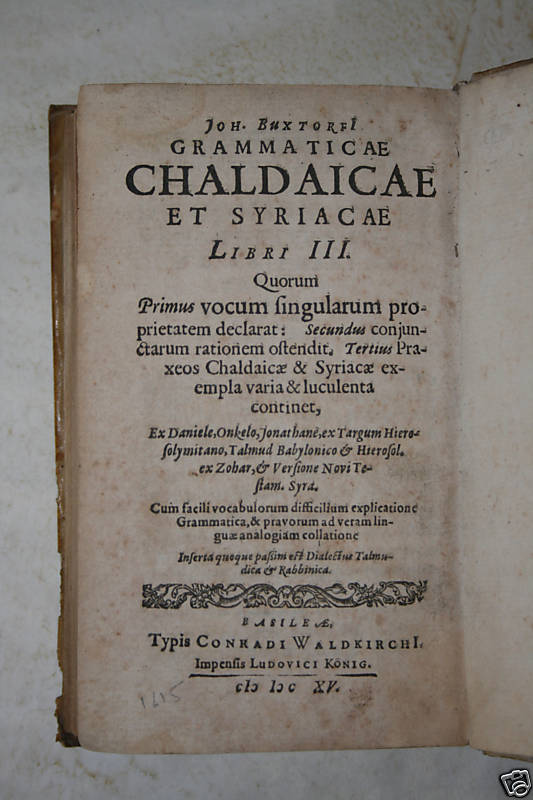
Title page of Buxtorf's Grammaticae Chaldaicae (1615).

- Manuale Hebraicum et Chaldaicum (1602; 7th ed., 1658).
- Synagoga Judaica (1603 in German; afterwards translated into Latin in an enlarged form), a valuable repertory of information regarding the opinions and ceremonies of the Jews.
- Lexicon Hebraicum et Chaldaicum cum brevi Lexico Rabbinico Philosophico (1607; reprinted at Glasgow, 1824).
- His great Rabbinical Bible, Biblia Hebraica cum paraphrasi Chaldaica et commentariis rabbinorum (2 vols., 1618; 4 vols., 1618–1619), containing, in addition to the Hebrew text, the Aramaic Paraphrases of Targums, punctuated after the analogy of the Aramaic passages in Ezra and Daniel (a proceeding which has been condemned by Richard Simon and others), and the Commentaries of the more celebrated Rabbis, with various other treatises.
- Tiberias, sive Commentarius Masoreticus (1620; quarto edition, improved and enlarged by J. Buxtorf the younger, 1665), so named from the great school of Jewish criticism which had its seat in the town of Tiberias. It was in this work that Buxtorf controverted the views of Elias Levita regarding the late origin of the Hebrew vowel points, a subject which gave rise to the controversy between Louis Cappel and his son Johannes Buxtorf II.

Buxtorf did not live to complete the two works on which his reputation chiefly rests, his Lexicon Chaldaicum, Talmudicum, et Rabbinicum, and the Concordantiae Bibliorum Hebraicorum, both of which were edited by his son. The lexicon was republished at Leipzig in 1869 with some additions by Bernard Fischer, and the concordance was assumed by Julius Fürst as the basis of his own Hebrew concordance, which appeared in 1840.

Frontispiece of Buxtorf's concordance, Basel, 1632

Wilhelm Gesenius wrote in 1815 that he considered Buxtorf's Hebrew grammar the best yet written.
