= I Have a Little Dreidel =

Children's Hannukah song

The Dreidel Song
Performed by the Singing Sergeants of the United States Air Force Band

"I Have a Little Dreidel" (also known as "The Dreidel Song" or "Dreidel, Dreidel, Dreidel") is a children's Hanukkah song in the English-speaking world that also exists in a Yiddish version called "Ikh bin a kleyner dreydl", (איך בין אַ קלײנער דרײדל Lit: I am a little dreidel). The song is about making a dreidel, a four-sided spinning top, and playing with it.

== History ==
The lyrics for the English version were written by Samuel S. Grossman and the composer of the English version is listed as Samuel E. Goldfarb (also S. E. Goldfarb). The song was written in 1927. The Yiddish version was both written and composed by Mikhl Gelbart, albeit under the name of Ben Arn, a pseudonym referring to himself as the son of Aaron.) There is a question about who composed this music since the melody for both the Yiddish and the English versions are precisely the same. The United Synagogue of Conservative Judaism (formerly known as The United Synagogue of America) is believed to be the first to publish the song in a collection of songs with its first printing in 1950 of the book, The Songs We Sing by Harry Coopersmith. The writers of the song in English only translated the original Yiddish version which was considered a folk song with the lyrics written by Mikhl Gelbart. Most believe that neither Goldfarb nor Grossman actually copyrighted the song and it was not included in Goldfarb's own printed book of songs because of this fact.

The meaning of the lyrics to the Yiddish and English versions is largely the same. However, in the original Yiddish version, the singer is referring to themself as the dreidel – a four-sided spinning top – made out of "blai" (Yiddish: בלײַ) (lead). In the English version, the lyrics refer to the singer having a dreidel made out of clay.

== Versions ==
English version

I have a little dreidel; I made it out of clay.
And when it's dry and ready, then dreidel I shall play.
Oh dreidel, dreidel, dreidel, I made it out of clay;
And when it's dry and ready, then dreidel I shall play.

It has a lovely body, with legs so short and thin.
When it gets all tired, it drops and then I win!
Oh dreidel, dreidel, dreidel, I made it out of clay;
And when it's dry and ready, then dreidel I shall play.

My dreidel's always playful; it loves to dance and spin.
A happy game of dreidel, come play now, let's begin.
Oh dreidel, dreidel, dreidel, I made it out of clay;
And when it's dry and ready, then dreidel I shall play.

Yiddish version
Transliteration (YIVO spelling)
Translation

איך בין אַ קליינער דריידל, געמאַכט בין איך פון בלײַ.
קומט לאָמיר אַלע שפּילן, אין דריידל – איינס, צוויי, דרײַ.
אוי, דריידל, דריידל, דריידל, אוי, דריי זיך, דריידל, דריי.
טאָ לאָמיר אַלע שפּילן, אין דריידל, איינס און צוויי.

Ikh bin a kleyner dreydl, gemakht bin ikh fun blay.
Kumt lomir ale shpiln, in dreydl – eyns, tsvey, dray.
Oy, dreydl, dreydl, dreydl, oy, drey zikh, dreydl, drey
To lomir ale shpiln, in dreydl, eyns un tsvey.

I am a little dreidel, I am made from lead.
Come let's all play dreidel – one two three.
Oh, dreidel, dreidel, dreidel, oh, spin, dreidel, spin.
So let's all play dreidel, one and two.

און איך האָב ליב צו טאַנצן, זיך דרייען אין אַ ראָד.
טאָ לאָמיר אַלע טאַנצן אַ דריידל-קאַראַהאָד.
אוי, דריידל, דריידל, דריידל, אוי, דריי זיך, דריידל, דריי.
טאָ לאָמיר אַלע שפּילן, אין דריידל, איינס און צוויי.

Un ikh hob lib tsu tantsn, zikh dreyen in a rod.
To lomir ale tantsn, a dreydl-karahod.
Oy, dreydl, dreydl, dreydl, oy, drey zikh, dreydl, drey.
To lomir ale shpiln, in dreydl, eyns un tsvey.

And I love to dance, to spin in a circle.
So let's all dance a dreidel circle-dance.
Oh, dreidel, dreidel, dreidel, oh spin, dreidel, spin.
So let's all play dreidel, one and two.

== See also ==
- Hanukkah
- Jewish music
- Ma'oz Tzur, Jewish liturgical poem, recited at Hanukkah
