= Justine W. Polier =

American judge

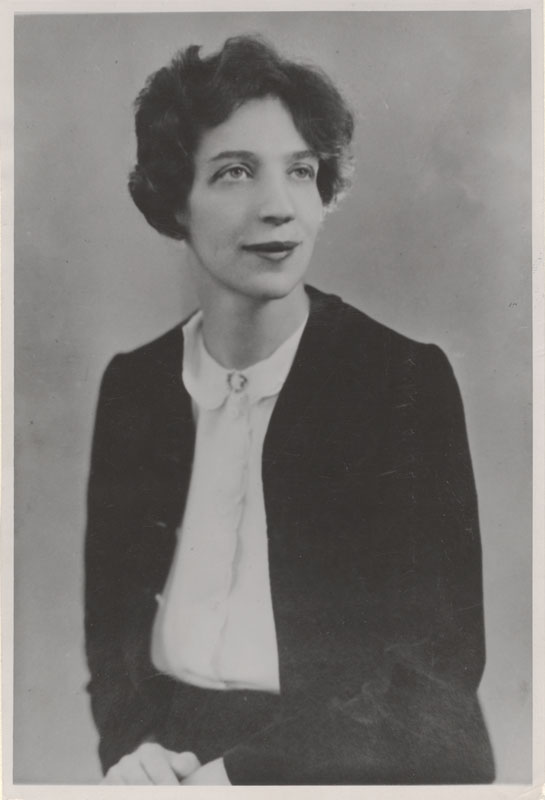
- Justine Wise Polier
- Born: Justine Wise; April 12, 1903; Portland, Oregon, U.S.
- Died: July 31, 1987 (aged 84); New York City, New York, U.S.
- Education: Bryn Mawr College; Radcliffe College; Barnard College
- Alma mater: Yale University Law School
- Occupations: Judge, lawyer, civic leader
- Years active: 1926–1987
- Spouse(s): Leon Arthur Tulin (m. 19??-1932; his death); Shad Polier (m. 1937)
- Children: 3
- Parents: Stephen Samuel Wise (father); Louise Waterman Wise (mother)

Justine Polier (née Wise; April 12, 1903 – July 31, 1987) was an American lawyer, the first woman Justice in New York. An outspoken activist and judge who served for 38 years on the Family Court bench.

== Background ==
Justine Wise was born April 12, 1903, in Portland, Oregon, to Rabbi Stephen Wise and Louise Waterman Wise. Her father was a prominent rabbi who helped found the American Jewish Congress (1918) and the NAACP (1909). He was also a leading advocate of a Jewish state and a pro-labor activist. Her mother was an artist and social worker who founded the Free Synagogue Adoption Committee in 1916 in New York.

As a young woman, she studied labor relations and advocated for workers’ rights, while also working at Elizabeth Peabody Settlement house and a textile mill. She attended Horace Mann High School, Bryn Mawr College, Radcliffe College, and Barnard College. In 1925, she enrolled in Yale Law School, where she eventually became editor of the Yale Law Journal. She commuted to support the 1926 Passaic Strike.

== Career ==
Polier began volunteering with the International Juridicial Association (IJA) in 1933 alongside her future husband Shad Polier.

Preferring social legislation to practicing law, Polier worked as the first woman referee and in 1934 Assistant Corporate Council for the Workman's Compensation Division.

In 1935, New York City Mayor Fiorello H. La Guardia made Polier a judge on the Domestic Relations Court. At age 32, she became the first woman judge in New York State.

In her time serving as judge, Polier was deeply involved in combating de facto segregation in the New York school system and institutional racism elsewhere in the public sector. She, along with Justice Jane Bolin, also fought racial discrimination by religious groups by helping to found a special school for black boys in New York. Additionally, she pushed for a psychological approach in the fight for elimination of race matching in probation.

In 1936, Polier decided In re Vardinakis, a case which she described "as 'a first baptism by religious fire.'" The decision involved a compromise between a divorcing Catholic mother and Muslim (some news sources, at that time, incorrectly cited the father as being of the Greek Orthodox faith, since the surname Vardinakis is Hellenic) father as to the religious training of their children, drawing criticism from Catholic periodicals while at the same time shaping Jewish involvement in the future of New York's "foundling" rotation system.

Polier was also an advocate for Jewish children attempting to escape from Nazi Germany, collaborating with Eleanor Roosevelt to, albeit unsuccessfully, urge Congress to allow Jewish children to circumvent strict immigration quotas.

She also fought against race discrimination, serving as Vice-Chairman of the Subcommittee on Bill of Rights and General Welfare, where she pushed for anti-discrimination laws in the context of employment and child welfare in education. In 1942, she and Justice Jane Bolin helped pass a "Race Discrimination Amendment" penned by her husband in the New York City's appropriations budget. Polier also supported the Ives-Quinn Act, a state level anti-discrimination law which made New York the first state with a dedicated agency for employment discrimination complaints in 1945.

During what she called her "second day," Polier worked to broaden services to troubled children and their families with organizations like the Citizens' Committee for Children, the Field Foundation, and the adoption agency founded by her mother in 1916 and renamed "Louise Wise Services" by Polier, who served as president of its board of directors beginning in 1946, and the Wiltwyck School. She also served on the board of directors for the Northside Center for Child Development, founded by Mamie Clark.

== Personal and death ==
Polier's first husband was Leon Arthur Tulin, a professor of criminal law at Yale. He died of leukemia in 1932. In 1933, at the International Juridical Association, she met Shad Polier, whom she married in 1937.

She was deeply moved by the Jewish prophetic tradition of commitment to justice. Polier's concern for Jewish rights meant that, like her parents, she was a committed Zionist. She served as vice-president of the American Jewish Congress, and president of its women's division. In addition, she believed that pluralism and the separation of church and state were "the essence of Americanism."

Polier was an advocate for poor women and children throughout her life. In the 1920s she fought for the Passaic women laborers, in the 1980s she condemned the federal ban on funding for poor women's medically necessary abortions, and she spent her retirement monitoring national juvenile detention policies for the Children's Defense Fund.

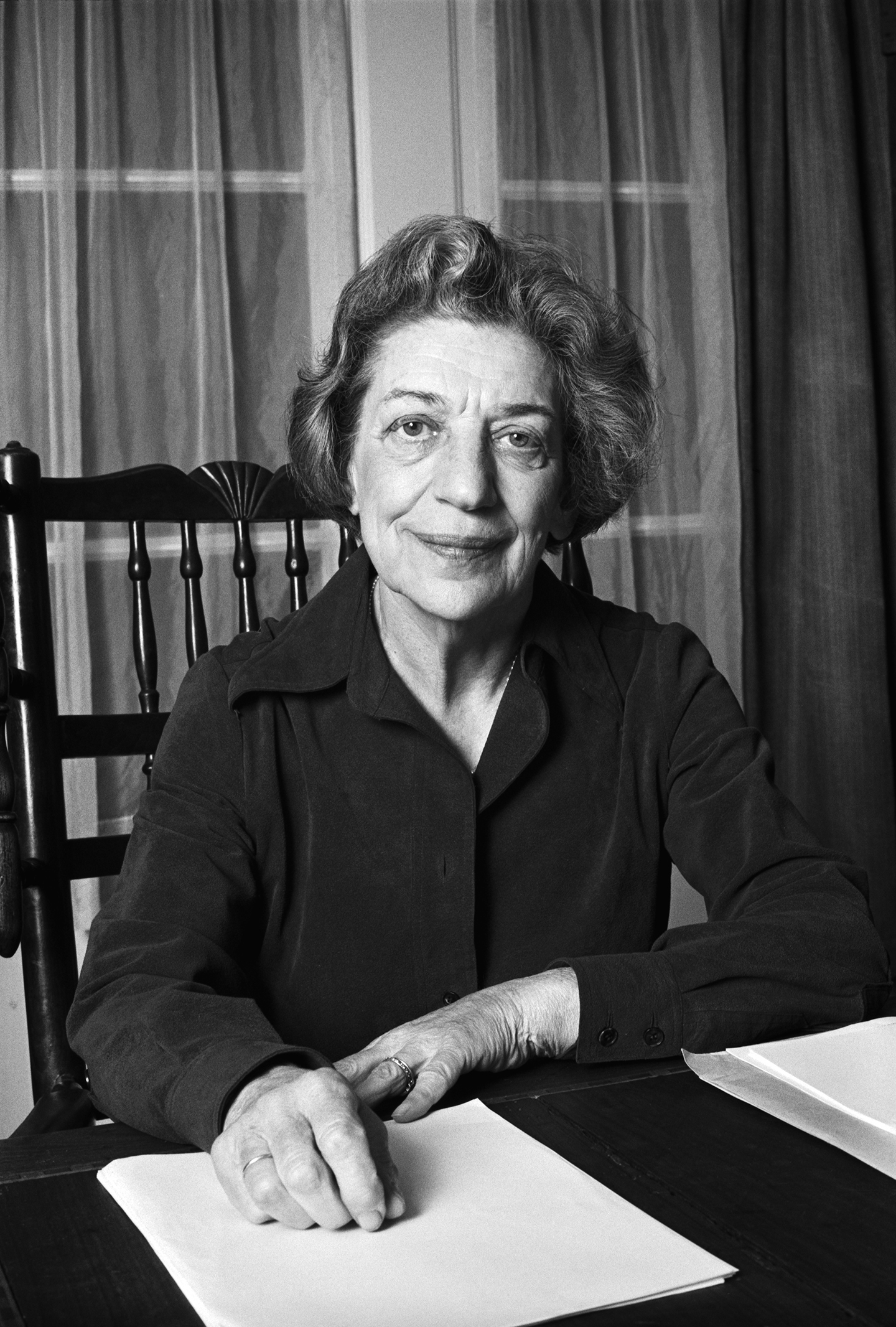
Justine W. Polier photographed in 1977 by Lynn Gilbert

She died on July 31, 1987, aged 84, in New York City.

== Legacy ==
The Citizens' Committee for Children has held a biannual "Justine Wise Polier Symposium" as early as 2012. During her time as President of the Board of Louise Wise Services, which her mother founded, Polier allowed the secret separation and study of identical twins, and other practices now considered unethical, and was featured in the documentary Three Identical Strangers (2018) and the memoir Identical Strangers: A Memoir of Twins Separated and Reunited.

To mark Jewish American Heritage Month in 2025, The View honored Polier's accomplishments as the first female judge in New York and as a social justice activist.

== See also ==
- List of first women lawyers and judges in New York

== External sources ==
- Ware, Susan (2004). Notable American Women: A Biographical Dictionary Completing the Twentieth Century, Volume 5. Cambridge University Press. pp. 521–523 (biography). ISBN 9780674014886.
- "Guide to the Shad Polier Papers,1916-1976". American Jewish Historical Society: Center for Jewish History.
- Jewish Women's Archive, "JWA - Justine Wise - Introduction," (March 20, 2008).
- Jewish Women's Archive: Justine Wise Polier
- Women of Valor exhibit on Justine Wise Polier at the Jewish Women's Archive
- Papers, 1892-1990. Schlesinger Library, Radcliffe Institute, Harvard University.
- Guide to the Justine Wise Polier and Eleanor Roosevelt Correspondence Collection at the American Jewish Historical Society, New York, NY.
