= Aaron Wise (rabbi) =

American rabbi (1844–1896)

Personal life
- Born: May 2, 1844 Eger, Hungary
- Died: March 30, 1896 (aged 51) New York
- Spouse: Sabine Fisher (m. 1864)
- Children: Stephen Samuel Wise
- Parent: Joseph Hirsch Weiss (father)

Religious life
- Religion: Judaism

Aaron Wise (May 2, 1844 – March 30, 1896) was an American rabbi.

== Life and work ==
Wise was educated in the Talmudic schools of Hungary, including the seminary at Eisenstadt, where he studied under Azriel Hildesheimer. Later he attended the universities of Leipzig and Halle, receiving his doctorate at the latter institution. He assisted Bernard Fischer in revising the Buxtorf lexicon, and was for several years a director of schools in his native town. He was for a time identified with the Haredi party in Hungary, acting as secretary to the organization Shomere ha-Datt, and editing a Judaeo-German weekly in its support. In 1873 Wise emigrated to the United States, and in 1874 became rabbi of Congregation Baith Israel in Brooklyn; two years later he was appointed rabbi of Temple Rodeph Shalom in New York, which office he held until his death.

Wise was the author of Beth Aharon, a religious school handbook; and he compiled a prayer-book for the use of his congregation. He was for some time editor of the Jewish Herald of New York, and of the Boston Hebrew Observer; and he contributed to the yearbooks of the Jewish Ministers' Association of America, as well as to other periodical publications. He was one of the founders of the Jewish Theological Seminary, and the first vice-president of its advisory board of ministers. Wise founded the Rodeph Shalom Sisterhood of Personal Service, which established the Aaron Wise Industrial School in his memory.

His wife was Sabine Fisher (born c.1844), whom he married in 1864; they had three daughters and three sons, including Rabbi Stephen Samuel Wise. He was the son of Chief Rabbi Joseph Hirsch Weiss.
