= Joseph Hirsch Weiss =

Hungarian rabbi (1800–1881)

Joseph Hirsch Weiss (Hungarian: Weiss (Weisz) József; 1800 in Podola (Slovak: Podolie), Nyitra vármegye, Hungary – 1881 in Erlau (German: Erlau)) was a Hungarian rabbi.

He was a descendant of a long line of rabbis resident in Moravia in the 17th and 18th centuries; his family name was originally Weissfeld.

He officiated for some time as rabbi of the congregation of Sook-Szelocze ((Sók)Szelőce, Slovak: Selice), and in 1840 was appointed chief rabbi of Erlau, known today as Eger, where he remained until his death. He was one of the leaders of the Haredi party in Hungary, and one of the chief opponents of the founders of the Reform movement in Pest. Identified with the Kossuth movement in 1848, he was obliged to seek refuge for a time in the monastery of Erlau under the protection of the resident archbishop. Later he was arraigned before the royal authorities at Vienna on a charge of sedition, but was ultimately acquitted. A considerable portion of his library, consisting mainly of responsa, was presented by his grandson Stephen S. Wise to Columbia University in New York.

== Descendants ==
- Aaron Wise
- Rabbi Stephen Samuel Wise
