= Shalom Aleichem (liturgy) =

Traditional song sung by Jews every Friday to begin Shabbat

Shalom Aleichem (Hebrew: שָׁלוֹם עֲלֵיכֶם, 'Peace be upon you') is a traditional song sung by many Jews every Friday night upon returning home from synagogue prayer. It signals the arrival of the Shabbat, welcoming the angels who accompany a person home on the eve of the Shabbat. The custom of singing "Shalom Aleichem" on Friday night before Eshet Ḥayil and Kiddush is common among religious Jews.

There are many tunes to the song, and many recite each stanza 3 times.

== Sources ==
This liturgical poem was written by the kabbalists of Safed in the late 16th or early 17th century. A complete survey of extant manuscripts, compiled by Chaim Leiberman, is available in Kirjath Sepher vol. 38–9.

According to a homiletic teaching in the Talmud, two angels accompany people on their way back home from synagogue on Friday night—a good angel and an evil angel. If the house has been prepared for the Shabbat ("the lamp has been lit, the table set, and his couch spread"), the good angel utters a blessing that the next Shabbat will be the same, and the evil angel is forced to respond "Amen", but if the home is not prepared for Shabbat, the evil angel expresses the wish that the next Shabbat will be the same, and the good angel is forced to respond "Amen". The hymn is assumed to be based on this teaching.

== Words ==
Hebrew text:	Romanization:	English translation
שָׁלוֹם עֲלֵיכֶם מַלְאֲכֵי הַשָּׁרֵת מַלְאֲכֵי עֶלְיוֹן מִמֶּלֶךְ מַלְכֵי הַמְּלָכִים הַקָּדוֹשׁ בָּרוּךְ הוּא	Shalom aleichem mal'achei ha-sharet mal'achei Elyon, mi-melech malchei ha-milachim ha-kadosh Baruch Hu.	Peace upon you, ministering angels, messengers of the Most High, sent by the king, King of Kings, the Holy One, Blessed be He.
בּוֹאֲכֶם לְשָׁלוֹם מַלְאֲכֵי הַשָּׁלוֹם מַלְאֲכֵי עֶלְיוֹן מִמֶּלֶךְ מַלְכֵי הַמְּלָכִים הַקָּדוֹשׁ בָּרוּךְ הוּא	Bo'achem le-shalom mal'achei ha-shalom mal'achei Elyon, mi-melech malchei ha-milachim ha-kadosh Baruch Hu.	Come in peace, messengers of peace, messengers of the Most High, sent by the king, King of Kings, the Holy One, Blessed be He.
בָּרְכוּנִי לְשָׁלוֹם מַלְאֲכֵי הַשָּׁלוֹם מַלְאָכֵי עֶלְיוֹן מִמֶּלֶךְ מַלְכֵי הַמְּלָכִים הַקָּדוֹשׁ בָּרוּךְ הוּא	Barchuni le-shalom mal'achei ha-shalom mal'achei Elyon, mi-melech malchei ha-milachim ha-kadosh Baruch Hu.	Bless me with peace, messengers of peace, messengers of the Most High, sent by the king, King of Kings, the Holy One, Blessed be He.
{בְּשִׁבְתְּכם לְשָׁלוֹם מַלְאֲכֵי הַשָּׁלוֹם מַלְאָכֵי עֶלְיוֹן מִמֶּלֶךְ מַלְכֵי הַמְּלָכִים הַקָּדוֹשׁ בָּרוּךְ הוּא}	{Beshivtechem le-shalom mal'achei ha-shalom mala'chei Elyon, mi-melech malchei ha-milachim ha-kadosh Baruch Hu.}	{May your stay be in peace, messengers of the peace, messengers of the Most High, sent by the king, King of Kings, the Holy One, Blessed be He.}
צֵאתְכֶם לְשָׁלוֹם מַלְאֲכֵי הַשָּׁלוֹם מַלְאָכֵי עֶלְיוֹן מִמֶּלֶךְ מַלְכֵי הַמְּלָכִים הַקָּדוֹשׁ בָּרוּךְ הוּא	Tzeitchem le-shalom mal'achei ha-shalom mal'achei Elyon, mi-melech malchei ha-milachim ha-kadosh Baruch Hu.	Go in peace, messengers of peace, messengers of the Most High, sent by the king, King of Kings, the Holy One, Blessed be He.

== Variations and emendations ==
Mizrahi and some Sephardi traditions include a penultimate verse, beginning בְּשִׁבְתְּכם לשׁלוֹם, "In your rest for peace ..." and the final verse has a {בְּ} inserted in front of the צ which Koren claims does not change the meaning of the last verse. This {בְּ} is also present in Tikunei Shabbos, the earliest known printing of the poem; as is one before the {ב} of the second verse.

Elijah of Vilna (1720–1789) worried about the phrasing and warned singers to be careful not to pause between elyon, Most High, and mee-melech, from the king. According to Jacob Zallel Lauterbach (1873-1942) the words ממלך מלכי המלכים are not original. Some versions include melech instead of mi-melech.

Moshe Yair Weinstock, among others, criticizes the final verse for rudely urging the angels on.

Yaakov Chaim Sofer, in his work Kaf Hachayim, (262:16) notes:

ומנהגינו לומר אחר ברכוני לשלום וכו' בשבתכם לשלום וכו' ואח"כ חוזרים לומר ברכוני לשלום וכו' ואח"כ אומרים בצאתכם לשלום וכו' וחוזרים לומר ברכונו לשלום וכו' ור"ל ברכוני בעת בואכם ובעת שבתכם ובעת צאתכם ור"ל בשעה שאתם יוצאים באיזה שעה שרוצים לצאת

And our custom is to say, after 'Bless me for peace etc.', 'In your rest for peace etc.'. And afterwards we repeat, saying 'Bless me for peace etc.,' and then we say '{In} your departure to peace etc.,' and then we repeat, saying 'Bless me for peace etc.;' the purpose being to request a blessing during your arrival and during your rest and during your departure – and my meaning is, at the time that you depart, i.e. at whatever time you wish to depart.

This position resolves a common complaint about the wording—namely, that it sounds like the speaker is shooing the angels away—and somewhat neatens the grammar, especially of the Sephardic tradition. The resultant text translates:

Peace be with you, O ministering angels, messengers of the Most High, sent by the king, King of Kings, the Holy One, Blessed be He.

As you approach to peace, O messengers of peace, messengers of the Most High, sent by the King of Kings, the Holy One, Blessed be He,
bless me with peace, O messengers of peace, messengers of the Most High, sent by the king, King of Kings, the Holy One, Blessed be He.

As you relax in peace, O messengers of peace, messengers of the Most High, sent by the king, King of Kings, the Holy One, Blessed be He,
bless me with peace, O messengers of peace, messengers of the Most High, sent by the king, King of Kings, the Holy One, Blessed be He.

As you depart to peace, O messengers of peace, messengers of the Most High, sent by the king, King of Kings, the Holy One, Blessed be He,
bless me with peace, O messengers of peace, messengers of the Most High, sent by the king, King of Kings, the Holy One, Blessed be He.

Rabbi Jacob Emden, in his prayerbook, Bet El (1745), criticized the use of the hymn on the grounds that supplications on the Sabbath and supplications to angels were inappropriate and the hymn's grammar—arguing that the inclusion of the prefix מִ at the beginning of every second line (i.e., mee-melech) was bad form, as it rendered the passage, "angels of the Most High, away from the King who rules over kings". He, therefore, deleted that מִ, thereby reducing mi-melech to melech, and that deletion has been emulated in some other prayerbooks (a small minority) such as Seligman Baer's Siddur Avodat Yisroel (1868), the Orot Sephardic, and Koren's Mizrahi (but not Koren's Ashkenaz or Sefard) prayerbook, although it makes the musical meter a bit awkward.

== Melodies ==
Many different melodies have been written for Shalom Aleichem.

The slow, well-known melody for the song was composed by the American composer and conductor Rabbi Israel Goldfarb in May, 1918, while sitting near the Alma Mater statue in front of Low Memorial Library at Columbia University, and first published later that year as "Sholom Aleichem—שָׁלוֹם עֲלֵיכֶם" in Friday Evening Melodies by Israel and his brother Samuel. The famous Goldfarb song is often presumed to be a traditional Hasidic melody. I. Goldfarb wrote in 1963, "The popularity of the melody traveled not only throughout this country but throughout the world, so that many people came to believe that the song was handed down from Mt. Sinai by Moses." In the Preface to "Friday Evening Melodies" the composers articulated the goal of avoiding the extremes of both the free-form emotive Eastern European musical liturgical style and the classical Western European musical structure of "Israel Emancipated".

A traditional Moroccan Jewish melody is identical to the song El Rey Nimrod.

A modern, exuberantly joyful version of this melody has been popularized by Idan Yaniv and Kinderlach; it was released in September 2009.

As one of her last acts, Debbie Friedman shared her version of "Shalom Aleichem" with Rabbi Joy Levitt. Friedman believed it was this song that would become her legacy.

Another common melody, with a faster, more upbeat tempo was composed by Rabbi Shmuel Brazil.
