= Israel Goldfarb =

Galician-born American rabbi, cantor and composer

Personal life
- Born: c. 1879 Sieniawa, Galicia, Austria-Hungary
- Died: February 13, 1967 Oceanside, New York, United States
- Buried: Mount Carmel Cemetery
- Spouse: Frieda Kessler (m. 1904)
- Relatives: Samuel E. Goldfarb (brother)

Religious life
- Religion: Judaism
- Denomination: Conservative Judaism

Jewish leader
- Synagogue: Congregation Baith Israel Anshei Emes
- Semikhah: Jewish Theological Seminary of America

Israel Goldfarb (Hebrew: ישראל גודלפרב; c. 1879 – February 13, 1967) (Note: Goldfarb's birth date is reported differently in historical records. His gravestone lists November 26, 1879 as his birth date, while his 1912 naturalization petition gives it as December 10, 1880. A biographical sketch published by Baith Israel Anshei Emes in 1940 lists his date of birth as December 15, 1879.) was a Galician-born American rabbi, cantor, and composer. He led Congregation Baith Israel Anshei Emes in Brooklyn for more than fifty years, and was a founder of and instructor at the Cantor's Institute of the Jewish Theological Seminary of America. He published numerous collections of melodies for synagogue, school, and home use.

Goldfarb has been celebrated as the "father of congregational singing" in synagogues, and many of his musical settings became so ubiquitous that they came to be regarded as traditional. He is perhaps best known for his popular setting of Shalom Aleichem.

== Early life and education ==
Israel Goldfarb was born in Sieniawa, Galicia (then part of Austria-Hungary), the second of eleven children of Nathaniel David and Malye Goldfarb. He immigrated to the United States in 1892 or 1893.

As a youth he sang in synagogue choirs and studied music privately. Goldfarb later pursued rabbinic studies at the Jewish Theological Seminary of America, from which he was ordained in 1902. He also studied musical education at Columbia University and music at the Institute of Musical Art (today the Juilliard School).

== Career ==
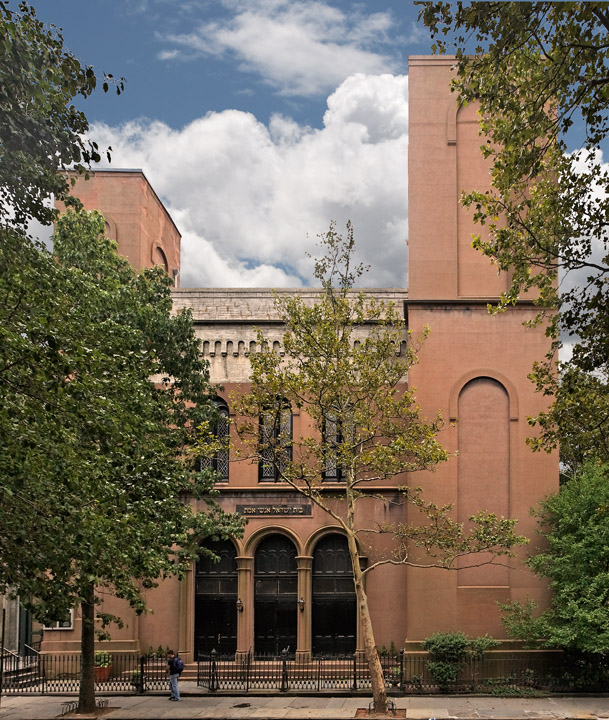
Exterior of Congregation Baith Israel Anshei Emes in Brooklyn

While still a rabbinical student, Goldfarb was appointed in 1901 to lead Congregation B'nai Jeshurun in Staten Island as both rabbi and cantor, a position he held until 1905. That year, he was appointed cantor and director of the Sunday school at Congregation Baith Israel Anshei Emes in Brooklyn. In 1906 he became its rabbi, a position he held until 1959, when he was named rabbi emeritus.

During his early tenure the congregation relocated and merged with another Brooklyn synagogue. Goldfarb played a central role in the transition and helped organize its Talmud Torah in 1905 and its Sisterhood in 1910.

From 1920 to 1942 Goldfarb taught Jewish liturgical music at the Jewish Theological Seminary. Through the Society for the Advancement of Jewish Music, he helped establish several cantorial schools, including the School of Sacred Music at Hebrew Union College – Jewish Institute of Religion and the Cantors' School at Yeshiva University. In 1949, the Jewish Theological Seminary awarded Goldfarb an honorary Doctor of Hebrew Letters degree.

== Communal work ==
In 1903 Goldfarb participated in founding the Cantors Association of the United States and Canada and later served as its president for two years. He also served as treasurer of the Rabbinical Assembly for a decade and was a past president of the New York Board of Rabbis.

Goldfarb and several of his brothers were involved with the Young Israel movement. He frequently walked between Brooklyn and Manhattan on Friday nights to introduce his liturgical melodies at Young Israel Oneg Shabbat programs.

== Musical publications ==
Between 1918 and 1929, Goldfarb collaborated with his brother Samuel, head of music for the New York Bureau of Jewish Education, on a series of songbooks intended for communal and school use. They together published over ten volumes of music, including the widely circulated collections Friday Evening Melodies (1918) and The Jewish Songster (1919).

Goldfarb composed a melody for the Kabbalistic hymn Shalom Aleichem in May 1918. The setting was first published in Friday Evening Melodies, and it debuted at a Jewish youth rally in Madison Square Garden. The composition became widely adopted in Ashkenazi congregations in North America and later internationally. Some later publications and recordings identified the melody as "traditional" or "Hasidic," despite its documented authorship.

== Death ==
Goldfarb died on 13 February 1967 at South Nassau Communities Hospital in Oceanside, New York, at the age of 87. He was survived by his wife, Frieda Kessler, their children, and extended family members.
