= Samuel E. Goldfarb =

American singer

Samuel Eliezer Goldfarb (Hebrew: שמואל אליעזר גולדפרב, June 18, 1891 – October 22, 1978), was an American composer, arranger, choir conductor, music director, cantor, piano accompanist, and educator.

== Life ==
=== Religious upbringing ===
Goldfarb was born in Sieniawa, a town in modern-day Poland. His Hebrew name was given in honor of his mother's deceased father. Born to Malya Molly Goldfarb and Nesanel Dovid Bryer, a cantor and small merchant, his family moved to Lower East Side, New York City, and he was raised in a strictly traditional Hasidic family along with 5 brothers and 5 sisters on 4th Street. His family attended the Shinyeve Chevreh synagogue, named after the immigrants' home town of Shinyeve (the Yiddish name of Sieniawa) in Galicia, the seat of the tsadik Rabbi Yechezkel Shraga Halberstam. As a boy, he attended Public School Number 4 on 203 Rivington Street, followed by daily lessons in the Machzikei Talmud Torah school at 227 East Broadway. In his teens, he went to DeWitt Clinton High School on West 13th Street, and studied Gemara with a private tutor.

=== Musical beginnings ===
Samuel showed an early interest in music, learning to read music from his much older brother, Rabbi Israel Goldfarb, and singing in local synagogue boys' choirs, and he went on to study composition, conducting, and voice at Columbia University Teachers College and take private piano and organ lessons while earning a living by playing theater piano in a Yiddish movie and vaudeville theater on Rivington Street and in a nickelodeon on Sutton Street. In 1914, on October 20, he married Bella Horowitz in Brooklyn, and the couple had two children, Myron and Ruth. After graduating with a bachelor's degree from Columbia, Goldfarb stayed in New York for several years working as a choir conductor, accompanist, composer, and arranger. As an accompanist, he worked with local songwriters such as Irving Berlin and George Gershwin, cantors such as Yossele Rosenblatt and the four Kusevitsky brothers, and theatrical stars such as Molly Picon.

=== Early career ===
In 1923 he moved to Reno, Nevada, where he played organ and piano at the Majestic Theater, and became cantor and choir director at Temple Emanu-El, but he returned to New York in 1925 to devote his life to Jewish music and was soon appointed head of the Music Department of the incipient Bureau of Jewish Education, in New York (now the Jewish Education Project), a position he retained for about 13 years. His duties included teaching and entertaining hordes of Jewish children with stories and songs in Extension Schools on Sundays; conducting courses and concerts and evaluating music teachers at Talmud Torah schools; collecting and writing Bible songs; and comparing the work of his music teachers with public-school music curricula. It was also during this period that he and his brother Israel published most of their songbooks.

=== Later career ===
In 1929 he moved to Los Angeles, where he tried to break into the music-studio scene. He re-acquainted himself with Sylvia Lupow, whom he had known since she was twelve, to join him and marry him there in 1930. Soon after, they moved to Washington state, where he had been offered the music directorship at Temple De Hirsch Sinai in Seattle, and where they raised three sons and remained for the rest of their lives. As music director, Samuel directed multiple choirs, played the organ, coached singers, composed and arranged music, wrote and directed Chanukah shows, and taught Hebrew School classes until his retirement in 1968. To complement the adult choirs, he built up three children's choirs at the temple (Junior, Intermediate, and Senior), some of whose members went on to become famous singers, including Dyan Cannon and opera star Melvin Poll. Outside the Temple, he also directed the Halevy Singers, the Sephardic Men's Choir, and the Seattle Hillel Student Choir. When accompanying the choir on the organ, he was said to “conduct with his eyebrows”.

=== Final years ===
At the celebration of his 25th anniversary at Temple De Hirsch Sinai, Samuel and Sylvia were given a trip to Europe and Israel. On their return aboard the SS Andrea Doria, the ocean liner collided with the MS Stockholm and sank off the coast of Nantucket, Massachusetts, but the couple were among those rescued.

Goldfarb died at Mercer Island, Washington. His collected manuscripts were donated by his children in 1984 to the Special Collections department of the University of Washington Libraries, which also houses a recording and transcript of an oral history interview of Samuel Goldfarb conducted in 1978.

== Works ==
On his own and together with his brother Israel Goldfarb, Samuel collected and composed hundreds of Jewish songs, publishing a number of songbooks, the most popular being the two-volume The Jewish Songster — המנגן, which was used in Jewish schools throughout the US and underwent many editions from 1918 to 1929. These works earned him the epithet "the father of Jewish music in America". Among his best-known songs are "I Have a Little Dreidel" and "Oh, Once There Was a Wicked Wicked Man". Although the bulk of his compositions consisted of Jewish songs and choral works for the Sabbath and holiday liturgies, he also composed secular Yiddish and English and vocal music, sacred and secular instrumental music. In addition, he composed several dramatic works, including biblical operettas such as his 1926 The Jews in Egypt and the music to Elma Ehrlich Levinger's libretto for Ruth of Moab (1923); and secular works such as I See an America, a choral arrangement of the text of a 1952 presidential campaign speech by Adlai Stevenson II.
