= W. Marvin Smith =

American lawyer

- Born: August 16, 1895
- Died: October 20, 1948 (aged 53); Washington, D.C.
- Education: Georgetown University Law School
- Employer: US Department of Justice
- Known for: Apparent suicide related to Hiss-Chambers Case
- Spouse: Inez
- Children: Jeanne

W. Marvin Smith (August 16, 1895 – October 20, 1948) was a long-time employee and attorney in the U.S. Department of Justice who testified in the Hiss-Chambers Case in August 1948 and then mysteriously died on October 20, 1948.

== Background ==
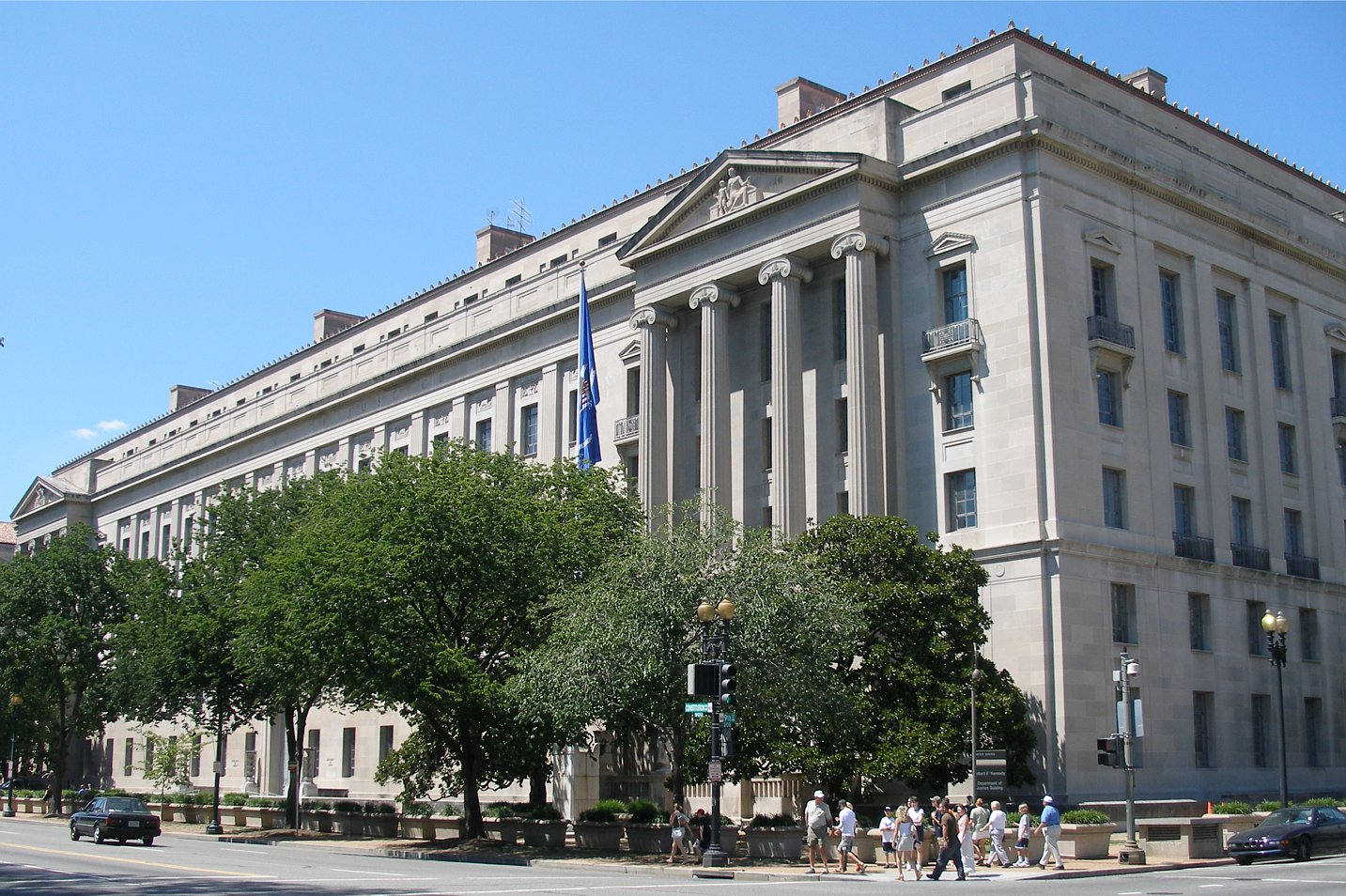
U.S. Department of Justice.

Smith graduated from Georgetown University law school.

== Career ==
Smith worked at the Department of Justice for 31 years, as he recalled.

In 1935 or 1936, Alger Hiss had worked with him at the Department of Justice. At that time, he notarized the transfer of title for Hiss' 1929 Ford Model A Roadster to the Cherner Motor Company, which sold the car same day to one "William Rosen."

== Testimony in Hiss Case ==
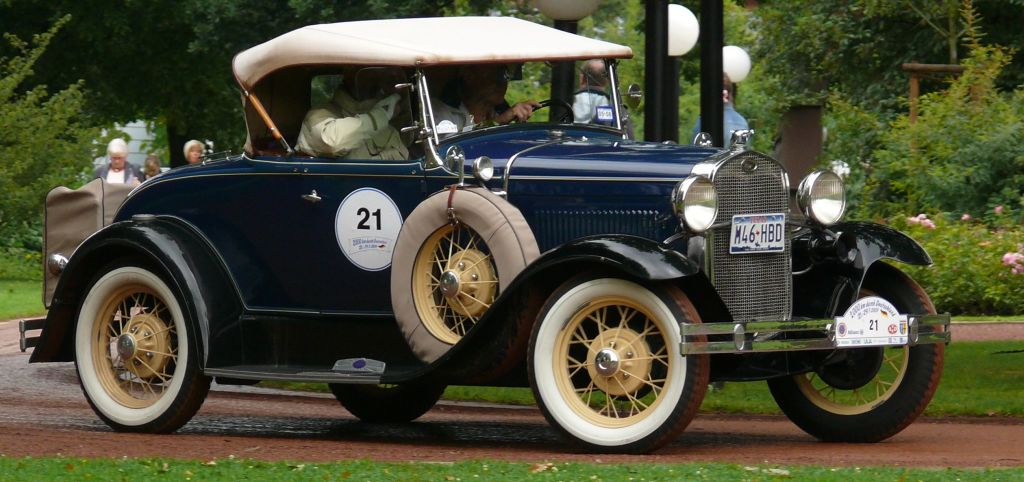
1930 or 1931 Ford Model A (1927–31) Deluxe Roadster

On August 20, 1948, Henry J. Gertler, secretary and treasurer of the Cherner Motor Company, testified before HUAC that W. Marvin Smith had notarized the gift of Hiss's 1929 Ford Model A Roadster to Cherner, which in turn sold it on the same day (July 23, 1936) to William Rosen (who resided at the home of one Benjamin Bialek). Then Smith testified regarding his signature: "I say I have no doubt that it is." Unlike most notaries, Marvin explained, "I have no record because, as I say, I charged no fees. I have not charged a fee since about 1925 — well, I think I got the commission in about 1919 and I charged a few fees at that time and had a record then, but I have not charged since." Rosen, who testified on August 26 and September 9, 1948, refused to give testimony, answering most questions with, "I refuse to answer the question on the ground that any answer I may give may tend to incriminate me." One of his few answers was "This is not my signature." Cherner later stated "I swear my life on it" that neither he nor Gertler had filled in details for "William Rosen" on the sale. Rosen and his wife Addie swore they had not been in Washington in 1936 (yet a pharmacist in the Petworth area of Washington claimed to know them).

== Personal and death ==
On October 20, 1948, Smith was found dead in the southwest stairwell of the (then) seven-storey Justice building. At that time, he worked on the staff of Solicitor General Philip B. Perlman. Co-workers reported him as "unusually depressed." He was survived by wife Inez and 21-year-old daughter Jeanne Smith.

== See also ==
- Harry Dexter White
- Laurence Duggan
- Alger Hiss
- Whittaker Chambers
- Abraham Feller
