= Louise Waterman Wise =

American painter (1872–1947)

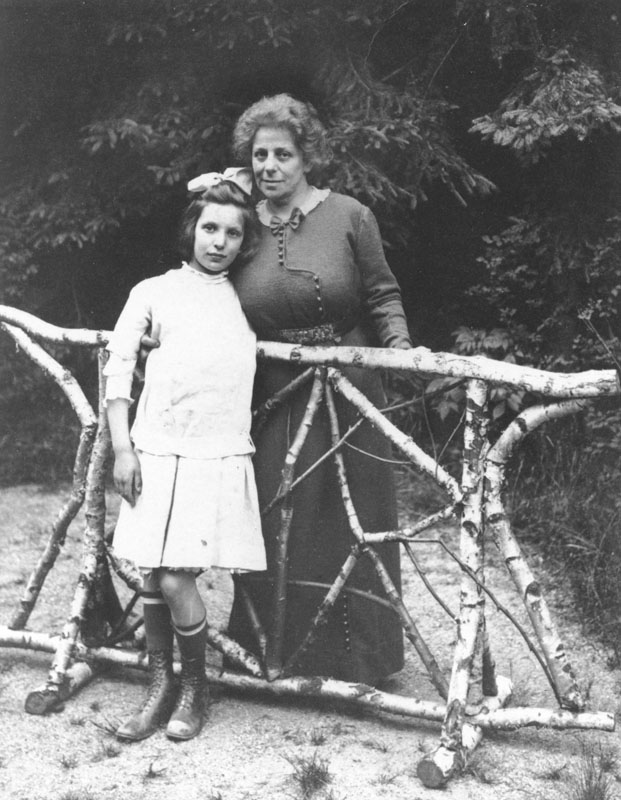
Louise Waterman Wise and Justine Wise

Louise Wise (née Waterman; July 17, 1872 – December 10, 1947) was a Jewish-American artist and social worker. Her husband was Rabbi Stephen S. Wise.

== Life ==
Wise was born on July 17, 1872 in New York City, New York, the daughter of German immigrants Julius Waterman and Justine Mayer. Her father was a craftsman who immigrated to America from Bayreuth in the 1840s and started a successful hoop-skirt factory. Her paternal uncle Sigmund Waterman was one of the first professors of German at Yale University.

Wise was nicknamed "Quicksilver" as a child due to her high spirits. Although her parents belonged to Temple Emanu-El, they didn't stress Judaism and sent her to an Episcopal Sunday school. She attended the Comstock School, an elite finishing school at 32 West 40th Street, Manhattan, where she studied fine arts and gained fluency in French and German.

Following her mother's unexpected death in 1890, she began reading literature from a wide variety of cultures, finding Ralph Waldo Emerson's writings on rebelling against tradition particularly appealing. She also met Felix Adler, founder of the Ethical Culture Society, during that time. With Adler's encouragement and despite her family's protests, she led art classes for the underprivileged and worked in the settlement houses of New York City's slums. She lived in Portland, Oregon, with her husband Stephen from 1900 to 1906, and while there she organized the Free Nurses Association, a social service agency. She returned to New York City with her family in 1907 and became a children's advocate.

In 1909, Wise led a movement to provide better ventilation for poorly-designed classrooms in public school buildings. After learning by chance that there was no Jewish agency to help Jewish orphans to be adopted by Jewish families and the orphans were regularly sent to asylums, she founded the Child Adoption Committee of the Free Synagogue in 1916 and, with the help of Jewish physicians and nurses, worked to take the Jewish orphans away from the asylums and have them adopted by Jewish families. In 1946, her daughter Judge Justine Polier Wise, joined as President of its Board of Directors and renamed it Louise Wise Services in her mother's honor.

She joined her husband in the 1919 Paris Peace Conference, where he was on a delegation to secure minority rights for Jews in Eastern Europe and sought international support for the creation of a Jewish state in Palestine, and while there she met Jewish representatives from all over Eastern Europe and heard their sufferings. The experience strengthened her Zionist sympathies, and four years later she visited Palestine and gave money and support for Henrietta Szold's work for children there.

Wise studied at the Art Student's League. Her portraits of Judge Julian W. Mack and her husband Rabbi Stephen S. Wise were part of the Tel Aviv Museum of Art's Permanent collection, and her portrait of Professor Richard J. H. Gottheil was part of Columbia University's permanent collection. She also painted portraits of Gertrude Lightstone Mittelmann, Claude G. Montefiore, Dr. Charles Parkhurst, Dr. James Morris Whiton, and Professor Albert Einstein. Her other paintings included Orphanage, Flight from Belgium, Crucifixion, and Sacrifice of Abraham. Her paintings were exhibited in the Pennsylvania Academy of the Fine Arts, the National Association of Women Painters and Sculptors, the Corcoran Gallery, and New York City galleries. She translated Aimé Pallière's French study on conversion to Judaism, La sanctuaire inconnu, into English under the title The Unknown Sanctuary in 1928. She also translated Edmond Fleg's Land of Promise in 1933 and his Why I Am a Jew in 1929. The latter translation became a fixture of the Haggadah and prayer books of Reform Judaism.

Wise was aware of the dangers represented by Hitler and the Nazis by the early 1930s and began public speaking despite her dislike of it. In 1931, she created the Women's Division of the American Jewish Congress, which sought to alert the public of the dangers of fascism and anti-Semitism in and out of America.

In 1933, under the auspices of the Women's Division, she established the Congress House for Refugees to provide temporary housing for Central and Eastern European refugees. A second house was added in 1935, followed by a third in 1936. The homes housed three thousand refugees before the outbreak of World War II, after which Wise converted them into Defense Houses to serve as hostels for Allied servicemen regardless of their religion. She travelled across the United States to raise funds for medical aid for wounded British and Russian civilians and for children evacuated from London during the Blitz. After the war, despite her failing health, she went to Europe with her husband to find ways to help Holocaust survivors.

In July 1946, the British offered her an honorary Order of the British Empire for her wartime service, making her likely the first Jewish American woman to receive the honor. However, as a lifelong Zionist and an outspoken critic of Britain's policies regarding Jewish settlement in Palestine, she refused the honor. She worked with Henrietta Szold to found Hadassah and helped Hadassah provide healthcare and nursing services to Palestine.

Wise met her future husband in January 1899, when on the death of a cousin she was asked to summon the cousin's rabbi, Stephen S. Wise. Her family opposed match due to Stephen's ethnic background (he was Austro-Hungarian instead of Bavarian), his poor financial status as a poor rabbi instead of a lawyer or banker, and his Zionism. Despite the opposition, the two were married in November 1900. Wise supported her husband and his goals for the next forty-seven years of their marriage, following him to Portland, Oregon when he served as rabbi of Temple Beth Israel and then back to New York City where he founded the Free Synagogue. Both of the couple's children, the writer James Waterman and the domestic relations court judge Justine, were born in Portland.

Wise died at home of pneumonia on December 10, 1947, aged 73. President Harry S. Truman, NAACP head Walter White, and Amalgamated Clothing Workers of America president Jacob Potofsky were among those who sent messages of condolences. Her funeral at the Free Synagogue was officiated by Rabbi Edward E. Klein, Rabbi Sidney E. Goldstein, and Rabbi J. X. Cohen, with American Jewish Congress executive director David Petegorsky delivering the eulogy. Over a thousand people attended the funeral, including Deputy Mayor John J. Bennett, National Community Relations Advisory Council chairman Henry Epstein, Fiorello La Guardia's wife, former New York City Council President Newbold Morris, and American Jewish Congress delegations from Philadelphia, Boston, and Baltimore. She was buried in Westchester Hills Cemetery.
