= Bernard Fischer =

Luxembourgish footballer

Personal information
- Date of birth: 30 May 1902
- Place of birth: Differdange, Luxembourg
- Date of death: 1 January 1971 (aged 68)
- Place of death: Niederkorn, Luxembourg

International career
Years	Team	Apps	(Gls)
- Luxembourg

Bernard Fischer (30 May 1902 – 1 January 1971) was a Luxembourgish footballer. He competed in the men's tournament at the 1928 Summer Olympics.
