= Stephen Samuel Wise =

Hungarian-American Reform rabbi (1874–1949)

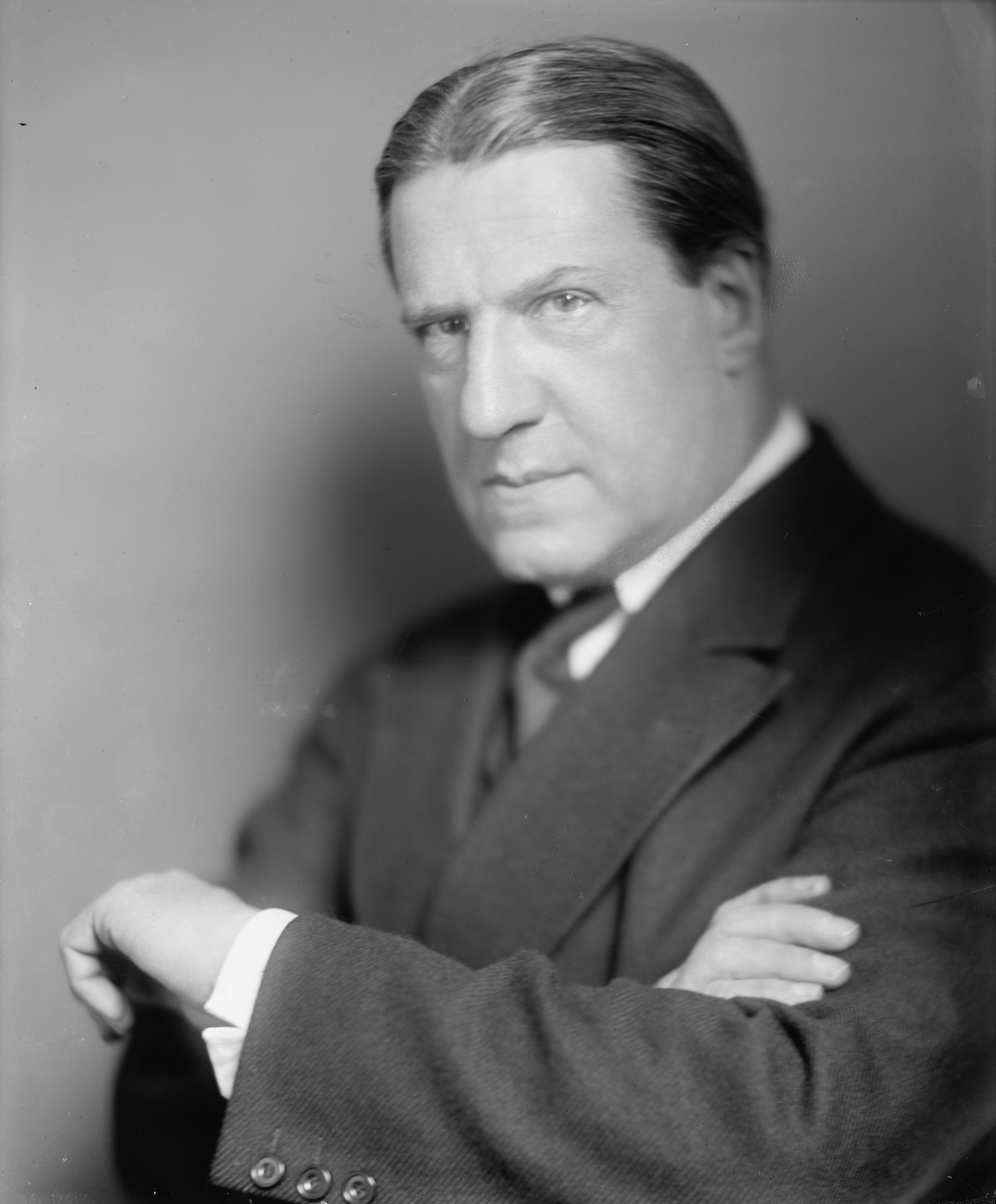
- Portrait by Harris & Ewing c. 1920s–1930s
- Born: Stephen Samuel Weisz; March 17, 1874; Budapest, Transleithania, Austria-Hungary
- Died: April 19, 1949 (aged 75); New York City, U.S.
- Education: Columbia University (BA, PhD)
- Occupations: Rabbi, writer
- Spouse: Louise Waterman Wise
- Children: Justine W. Polier, James W. Wise

Signature
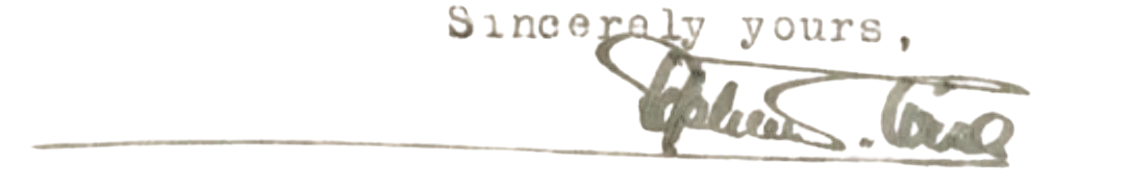

Stephen Samuel Wise (March 17, 1874 – April 19, 1949) was an early 20th-century American Reform rabbi and Zionist leader in the Progressive Era. Born in Budapest, he was an infant when his family immigrated to New York. He followed his father and grandfather in becoming a rabbi, serving in New York and in Portland, Oregon. Wise was also a founding member of the NAACP.

== Early life ==
Wise was born on March 17, 1874, in Budapest in the Austro-Hungarian Empire, the son and grandson of rabbis and their wives. His grandfather, Joseph Hirsch Weiss, was rabbi of Erlau, today known as Eger, and a highly conservative haredi scholar. Wise's father, Aaron Wise, earned a PhD and ordination in Europe. Wise's maternal grandfather, Móric Fischer de Farkasházy, created the Herend Porcelain Company. When Wise's father sought to unionize the company, Moric gave the family one-way tickets to New York. In the U.S., Aaron Wise eventually became chief rabbi of the Congregation Rodeph Sholom in New York City, moving from his own father's Orthodoxy toward Reform Judaism.

=== Education ===
Stephen Wise attended local public schools. He received his higher education at the College of the City of New York, Columbia College (B.A. 1892, Cum laude), and Columbia University (PhD 1902). Later he pursued rabbinical studies under rabbis Richard J. H. Gottheil, Alexander Kohut, Gersoni, Joffe, and Margolis. He was ordained as rabbi by Rabbi Adolph Jellinek of Vienna in 1893. In 1933, Wise received an honorary L.H.D. from Bates College.

== Career ==
In 1893, Wise was appointed assistant rabbi of Congregation B'nai Jeshurun, Manhattan; its senior rabbi was Henry S. Jacobs. Later in the same year, Wise became the senior rabbi of the same congregation.

In 1900, he was called as rabbi to Congregation Beth Israel in Portland, Oregon. Typical of the activists of the Progressive Era, he attacked "many of the social and political ills of contemporary America." In 1906, concerning another rabbinical appointment, Wise made a major break from the established Reform movement over the "question whether the pulpit shall be free or whether the pulpit shall not be free, and, by reason of its loss of freedom, reft of its power for good"; in 1907 he established his Free Synagogue, starting the "free Synagogue" movement.

Wise was an early supporter of Zionism. His support for, and commitment to Political Zionism was atypical of Reform Judaism, which had been historically non-Zionist since it adopted the Pittsburgh Platform in 1885. He was a founder of the New York Federation of Zionist Societies in 1897, which led in the formation of the national Federation of American Zionists (FAZ), a forerunner of the Zionist Organization of America. At the Second Zionist Congress (Basel, 1898), Wise was a delegate and secretary for the English language. Wise served as honorary secretary of FAZ, in close cooperation with Theodor Herzl, until the latter's death in 1904.

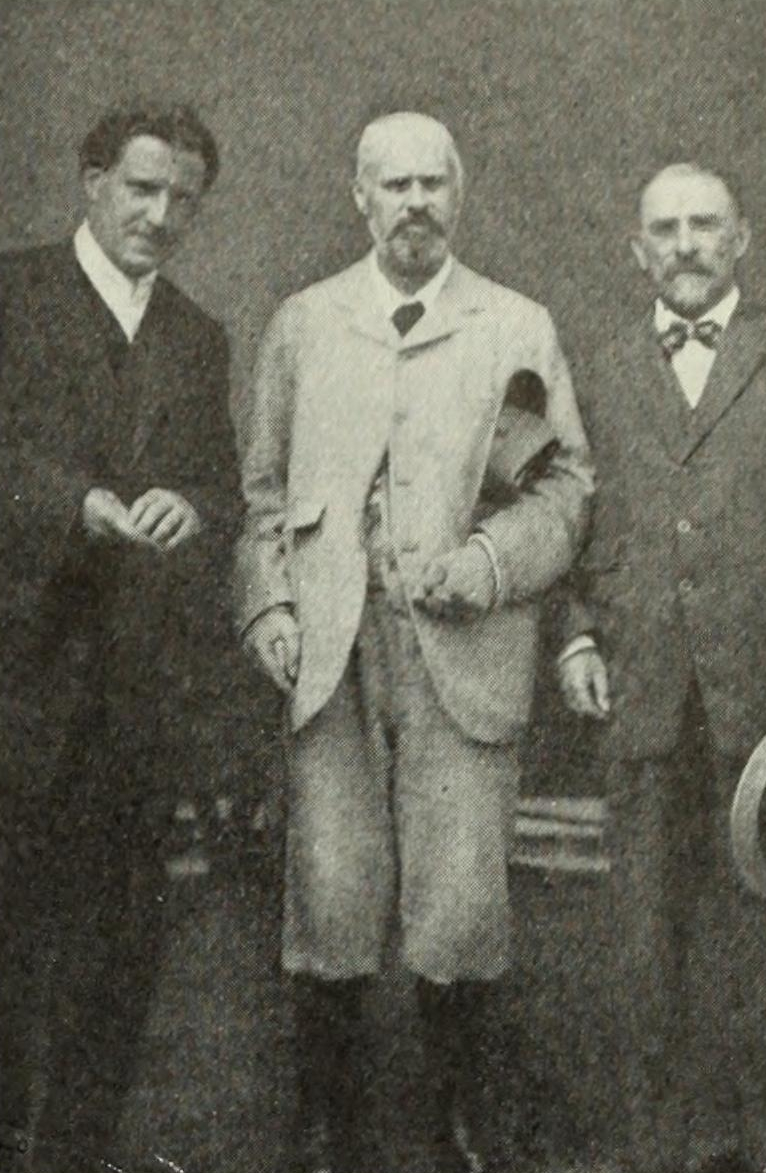
Wise (left) with Claude Montefiore (center) and Henry Morgenthau c. 1913

In 1915, Wise was one of the founding members of the American Committee on Armenian Atrocities, which later became Near East Relief. Historian Claire Mouradian states that his activities over thirty years (from the Hamidian massacres to the creation of the Republic of Turkey) "reveal a constant concern for raising awareness in favor of the Armenians, whose fate seemed to be a premonition of what might be awaiting Jews in Europe".

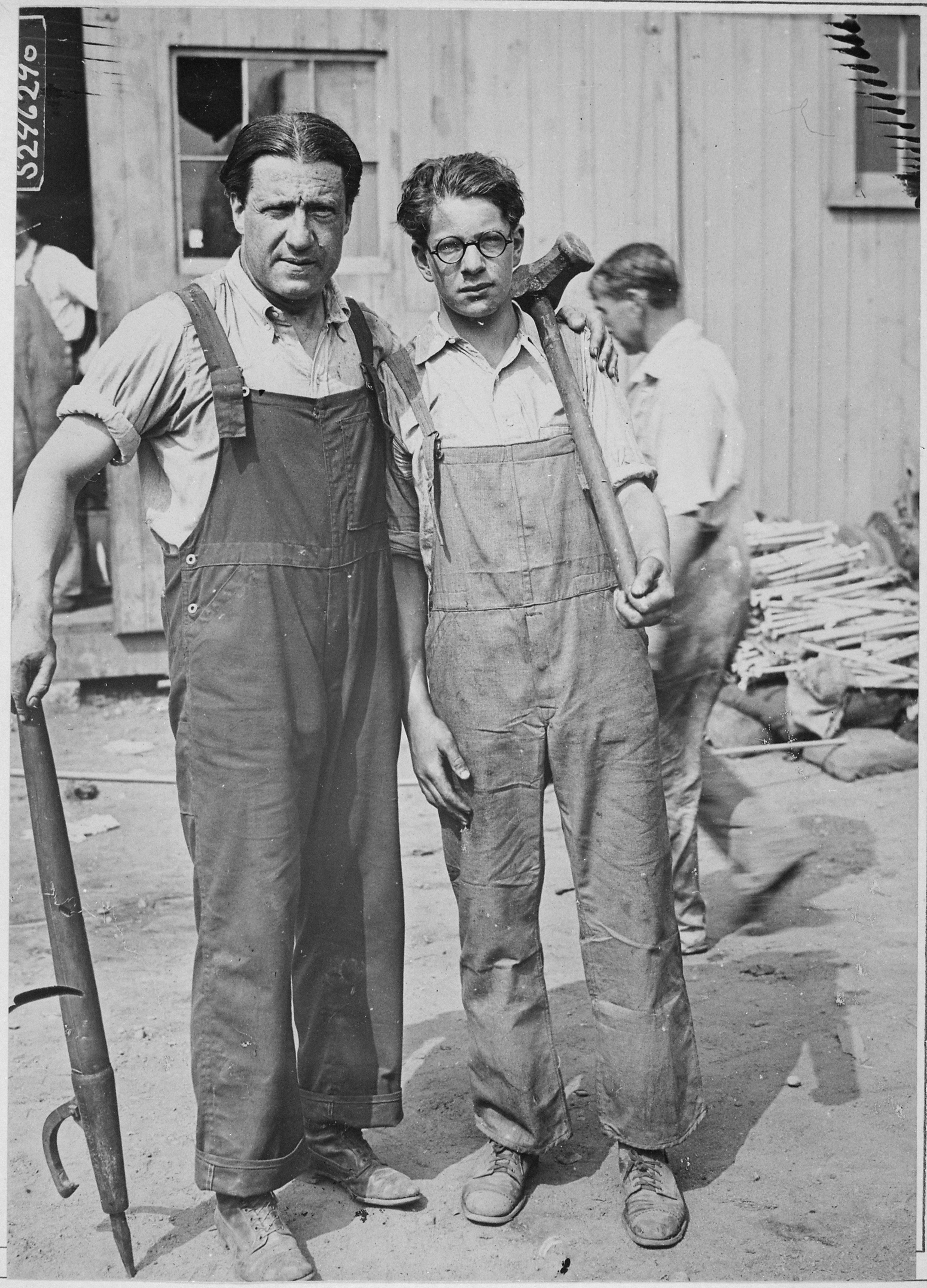
Wise and his son worked as laborers in the shipbuilding yards of the Luder Marine Construction Company, Stamford, Connecticut, during World War I

Joining U.S. Supreme Court Justice Louis Brandeis, Felix Frankfurter, and others, Wise laid the groundwork for a democratically elected, nationwide organization of 'ardently Zionist' Jews, 'to represent Jews as a group and not as individuals'. In 1917 he participated in the effort to convince President Woodrow Wilson to approve the Balfour Declaration in support of Jewish settlement in Mandate Palestine. In 1918, following national elections, this Jewish community convened the first American Jewish Congress in Philadelphia's historic Independence Hall.

In December 1925, Wise delivered a sermon about Jesus the Jew, making the case that Jews should view Jesus "as a great moral and ethical teacher, a Jew of whom they might be proud because of his teachings." This sermon caused an uproar among some Jewish institutions, culminating in an edict of condemnation against him by the Agudath Harabonim, the Union of Orthodox Rabbis. Because of the outcry, Wise resigned from his position as Chairman of the United Palestine Appeal. But he referred to the Orthodox condemnation as "un-Jewish," and in a statement to the Jewish Telegraph Agency, he protested, "What a mournful commentary upon the infinite hurt which the Jew has suffered at the hands of Christendom, that a Jewish teacher cannot even at this time speak of Jesus... without being hailed as a convert to Christianity or misunderstood by some of his fellow Jews...."

In 1938, as president of the American Jewish Congress, Wise said that adoption of the Alaska proposal in the Slattery Report would deliver "a wrong and hurtful impression ... that Jews are taking over some part of the country for settlement."

=== Friendship with Einstein ===
Albert Einstein found Wise's mixture of enlightened views and committed Zionism most agreeable, and they became friends when Einstein moved to the US. In a tribute to Wise on his 60th birthday, Einstein said, "Above all, what I admire in him is his bold activity toward building the self-respect of the Jewish people, combined with profound tolerance and penetrating understanding of everything human."

=== Views on Jerome Davis ===
During the trial of the sociologist Jerome Davis, Wise stated, based on more than 30 years of acquaintance, that Davis had "never, never" been sympathetic to communism.

=== Public and charitable offices ===
In 1902 Wise officiated as first vice-president of the Oregon State Conference of Charities and Correction. In 1903 he was appointed Commissioner of Child Labor for the State of Oregon, and founded the Peoples' Forum of Oregon. These activities initiated a lifelong commitment to social justice, stemming from his embrace of a Jewish equivalent of the Social Gospel movement in Christianity.

In A History of Jews in America historian Howard Sachar wrote, "In 1914, Professor Emeritus Joel Spingarn of Columbia University became chairman of the NAACP and recruited for its board such Jewish leaders as Jacob Schiff, Jacob Billikopf, and Rabbi Stephen Wise."

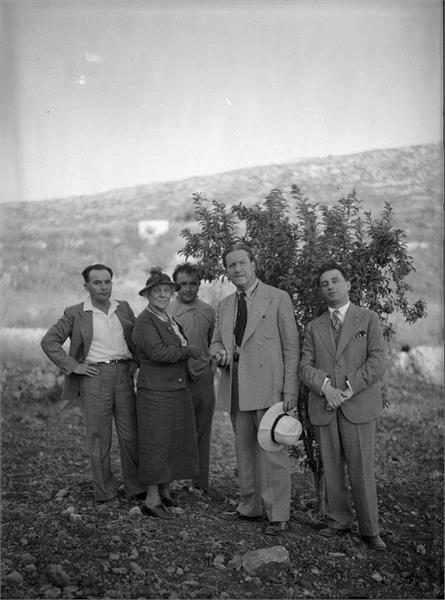
Stephen Wise on visit to Kiryat Anavim, 1935

In 1922 Wise founded the Jewish Institute of Religion, an educational center in New York City to train rabbis in Reform Judaism. It was merged into the Hebrew Union College a year after his death. In 1922 Wise was one of the founding trustees of the Palestine Endowment Funds, Inc., along with Julian Mack.

When the Federation of American Zionists (FAZ) was originally established, Wise was appointed the position secretary. After the organization transformed into the Zionist Organization of America, Rabbi Wise fulfilled positions as both president and vice president during his lifetime.

Wise was a close friend of President Franklin D. Roosevelt, who turned to Wise for advice on issues concerning the Jewish community in the United States. In addition, Wise had also acted a liaison to previous President Wilson.

At the 1924 Democratic National Convention, he was a delegate from New York; at the opening of the sixth session on June 28, 1924, he offered the invocation. During the 1928 campaign, Wise was a prominent supporter of Democrat Al Smith.

In 1925 Wise became chairman of Keren Hayesod, while continuing efforts to bring the Reform movement around to a pro-Zionist stance. With the rise to power of Adolf Hitler's regime, Wise took the position that public opinion in the United States and elsewhere should be rallied against the Nazis. He used his influence with President Roosevelt both in this area as well as on the Zionist question.

In 1933 while acting as honorary president of the American Jewish Congress, Wise led efforts for a Jewish Boycott of Germany. He stated "The time for prudence and caution is past. We must speak up like men. How can we ask our Christian friends to lift their voices in protest against the wrongs suffered by Jews if we keep silent? What is happening in Germany today may happen tomorrow in any other land on earth unless it is challenged and rebuked. It is not the German Jews who are being attacked. It is the Jews". Urged by Wise to protest to the German government, U.S. Secretary of State Cordell Hull issued a mild statement to the American ambassador to Berlin complaining that "unfortunate incidents have indeed occurred and the whole world joins in regretting them."

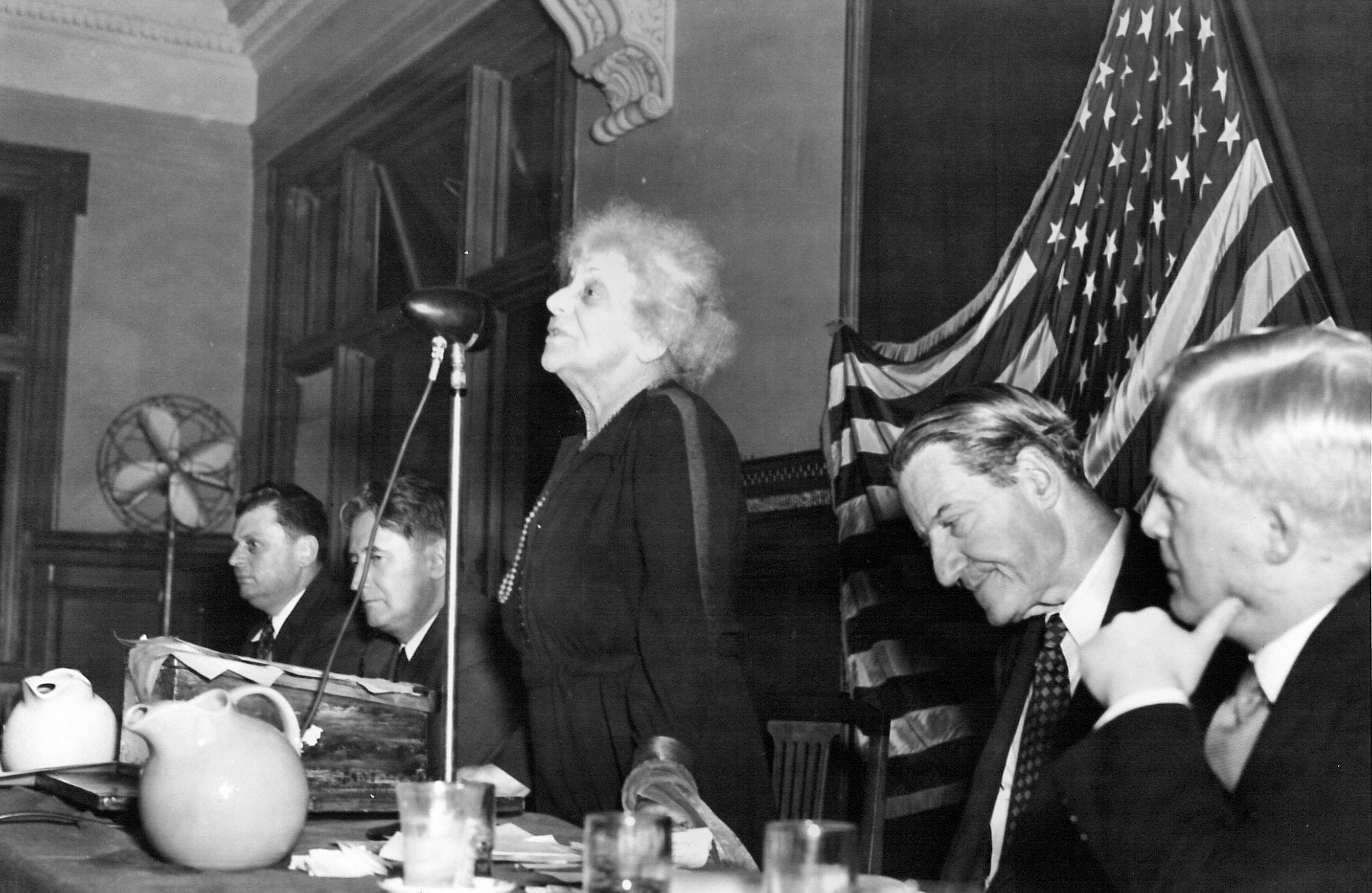
Jewish activist Louise Waterman Wise, addressing the 1944 War Emergency Conference of the World Jewish Congress her husband was president of, in Atlantic City

Wise, along with Leo Motzkin and Nahum Goldmann, encouraged the creation in August 1936 of the World Jewish Congress in order to create a broader representative body to fight Nazism. Wise served as founding president of the World Jewish Congress president until his death in 1949. He was succeeded by his friend Nahum Goldmann.

=== Holocaust awareness ===
Given his position as an influential and highly visible leader of the American Jewish community, Wise was inevitably caught up in the dilemmas facing American policy-makers and Jewish activists when awareness began to grow of the systematic efforts by the Nazi regime to exterminate European Jewry. On behalf of the American Jewish Congress, Wise reported back to Washington about the Jewish situation in Germany in the first two months of Nazi rule. He feared the extermination of the Jewish people in Germany describing "what seems like nothing less than an attempt, if not physically, to destroy, at least economically, and morally to exterminate the Jewish people, or great numbers of the Jewish people in Germany."

Wise's steady nine-year campaign to publicly expose Nazi atrocities against Jews had borne little practical fruit. Roosevelt was reluctant to spend political capital on behalf of foreign refugees, and access to visas and other paths of escape were effectively blocked by the assistant Secretary of State Breckenridge Long, an admirer of Hitler and Mussolini.

As early information of the full scale of the Nazi slaughter began to emerge from Europe, Jews in the U.S. and other countries were cast into an agonizing debate about how, and whether, to press governments to take steps to save them.

On August 8, 1942, Gerhart M. Riegner, then representative of the World Jewish Congress in Geneva, sent a cable (now known as the Riegner Telegram) to British and American diplomatic contacts, informing the Allies for the first time about the full official Nazi plans.

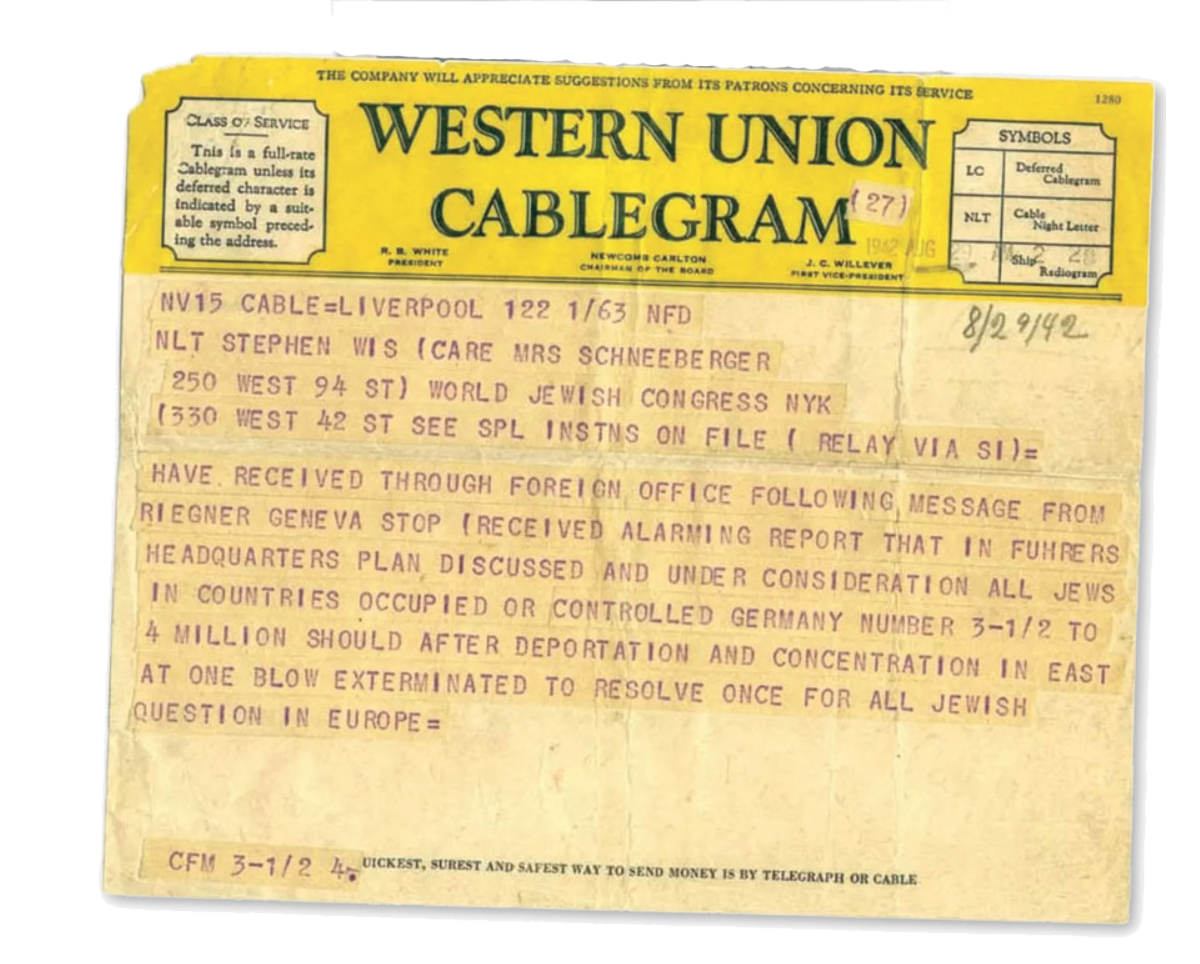
The follow-up telegram sent to Wise directly by Gerhart Riegner, warning of plans for the Holocaust

Riegner asked that Stephen Wise be made aware of the cable's contents, but U.S. State Department officials did not pass it along. Wise was not informed about the telegram until Riegner sent him another cable directly, almost three weeks later, on August 29. "Received alarming report," the cable read, "that in Fuhrers headquarters plan discussed and under consideration all Jews in countries occupied or controlled Germany number 3-1/2 to 4 million should after deportation and concentration in east should at one blow exterminated to resolve once for all Jewish question in Europe." This was precisely the plan that the Nazi regime was putting into motion.

Wise, innocent of the State Department's earlier receipt of the same news, passed this warning along to his government contacts. And, as was his general policy, refrained from speaking out about the reports of mass slaughter until they had been fully vetted by the State Department.

It was almost four months before U.S. Under-secretary of State Sumner Welles confirmed to Wise that the Riegner Telegram's information was accurate. Wise then held a press conference in Washington, D.C. on November 24, 1942, and announced that the Nazis had a plan for the extermination of all European Jews, and that the number of Jews murdered had already reached 2 million.

During the war years, Wise was elected co-chair of the American Zionist Emergency Council, a forerunner of the American Israel Public Affairs Committee.

Wise was an ardent opponent of the post-war efforts by Isaac Nachman Steinberg, co-founder of the Freeland League, to create a community for Jewish refugees in Suriname. In a letter to Keren Hayesod emissary Ida Silverman he wrote, "I personally believe, that Steinberg needs to be lynched or hanged and quartered, if that would make his lamented demise more certain."

== Works ==
Wise translated The Improvement of the Moral Qualities, an ethical treatise of the eleventh century by Solomon ibn Gabirol (New York, 1902) from the original Arabic, and wrote The Beth Israel Pulpit, among other works. He was invited to deliver the annual Charles P. Steinmetz Memorial Lecture at Union College in 1944.

== Criticism ==
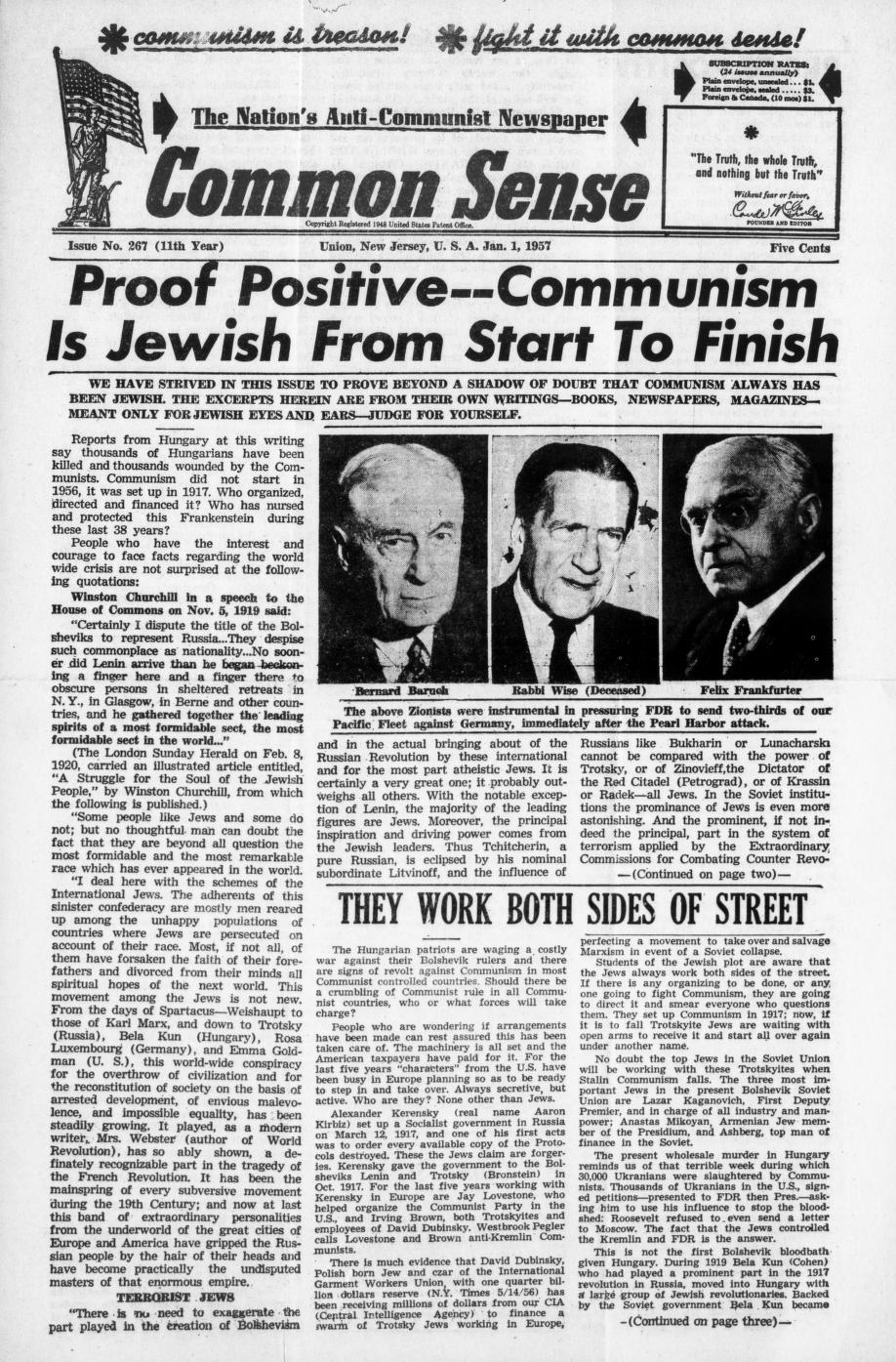
Front page of antisemitic and anticommunist newspaper Common Sense issue no 267, 1957, depicting Stephen Wise,

Wise's liberal Judaism conflicted with the view of Orthodox and Conservative Jews of the time, a dispute that continues through the present. They felt he worked too closely with his government and was too cautious in accepting and publicizing the early reports of the Holocaust.

Holocaust scholar Dr. David Kranzler, author of Orthodoxy's Finest Hour, wrote in 2002 that Wise had a "penchant for protecting his close friend and confidant US President Franklin D. Roosevelt (FDR) regardless of the cost to the Jews of Europe." Kranzler accused Wise of failing to recognize the existential threat to European Jewry prior to American entry into World War II, dismissing early reports of the Final Solution as propaganda, and obstructing rescue efforts.

Kranzler also suggested that Wise did not voluntarily publicize the Holocaust after the Riegner cable, but rather that he was pressured into going public by the American Orthodox Jewish community, who confronted him after receiving what is known as the Sternbuch Report on September 2, 1942. Kranzler wrote that Wise declined to publicize these reports until after the U.S. State Department had formally confirmed their accuracy, almost three months later. Kranzler complained that "Every time a unified committee for rescue was organized which was not entirely under Wise’s control, he would force the committee to dissolve."

1940s screenwriter and Jewish activist Ben Hecht had been recruited to the inner circle of the Zionist movement known as the Bergson Group. This was a committee led by Zionist Hillel Kook, who in his interactions with Americans favored the less alien-sounding alias Peter Bergson. Bergson and his team were members of the Irgun, a radical faction of Zionists who favored direct action over slow diplomatic negotiation. Bergson's original mission in the U.S. was to seek American help in creating an armed Jewish force to fight in the war. In 1942, after Bergson read the news stories of Stephen Wise's November 24 press conference, he pivoted into a full-bore fight to combat the slaughter of European Jews.

The Bergson Group's stance on European Jewry was opposed to Wise's: they believed their actions would save more Jews from the Nazi Holocaust. Most American Jewish institutions sided with Wise; Bergson and Wise jockeyed for influence over U.S. policy.

As part of his collaboration with Bergson, Hecht created a giant pageant publicizing the Holocaust called We Will Never Die which debuted at Madison Square Garden in New York City in 1943. Hecht recruited show-business friends like Kurt Weill and Moss Hart to write and stage his pageant, and to raise public awareness of the Nazis' mass murder of Jews as stridently as possible. As plans for the show accelerated, a disgruntled Hecht wrote that he was abruptly contacted by Wise:

Rabbi Stephen Wise, head of the Jews of New York, head of the Zionists and, as I knew from reading the papers, head of almost everything noble in American Jewry, telephoned me at the Algonquin Hotel where I had pitched my Hebrew tent.
Rabbi Wise said he would like to see me immediately in his rectory. His voice, which was sonorous and impressive, irritated me. I have never known a man with a sonorous and impressive voice who wasn't either a con man or a bad actor. I explained I was very busy and unable to step out of my hotel.
"Then I shall tell you now, over the telephone, what I had hoped to tell you in my study," said Rabbi Wise. "I have read your pageant script and I disapprove of it. I must ask you to cancel this pageant and discontinue all your further activities in behalf of the Jews. If you wish hereafter to work for the Jewish Cause, you will please consult me and let me advise you."
At this point I hung up.

Wise was successful in preventing some performances, but not the national broadcast, of We Will Never Die.

In the 2002 book A Race Against Death: Peter Bergson, America, and the Holocaust, David Wyman and Rafael Medoff argued that Wise hindered the Holocaust rescue attempts of the Bergson Group and others.

Well after the war Hillel Kook was interviewed in Manhattan by David Kranzler and said that he was considered by Wise to be a betrayer of Zionism since he was willing to save Jews by finding safety for them anywhere in the world, not only in Palestine. That was seen as competition with Zionism. Wise's position was that the Zionist cause is foremost. He stated in the Sol Blum led fall 1943 Congressional hearing investigating Hillel Kook that Jews should be saved (only) by opening the gates to Palestine, which doomed multitudes to a terrible fate, including being murdered. This ideology was shared by the then dominant Zionist leadership.

Historian Saul Friedländer said that Wise prevented the shipment of food packages from American Jews to German-occupied Poland for fear that the Allies would interpret the aid as being sent to the enemy. Unlike Wise, Friedländer believed that the Nazis were distributing aid packages to the concentration camps and ghetto Jews. In the spring of 1941, Rabbi Wise contacted the World Jewish Congress representatives in Europe to halt forthwith any shipment of packages to the ghettos. "All these operations with and through Poland must cease at once," Wise cabled to Congress delegates in London and Geneva, and at once in English means AT ONCE, not in the future."

Nachum Goldman, a high-level executive of the World Jewish Congress and close to Wise, went to the US State Department and according to the protocol, a copy of which is in A Race Against Death: Peter Bergson, America, and the Holocaust, pleaded for deporting Kook or drafting him into the army for the war, which may well have led to his demise.

In spite of the above, there is a street named for Wise in Jerusalem.

== Personal life ==
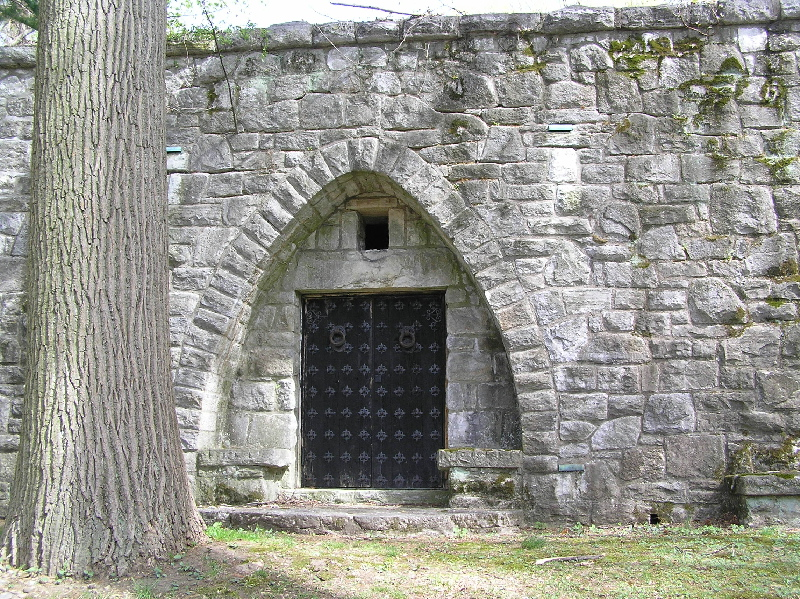
The mausoleum of Rabbi Stephen Wise in Westchester Hills Cemetery

Wise married Louise Waterman. The couple had two children: writer James Wise (1901–1983); and Judge Justine Wise Polier (1903–1987).

Wise died on April 19, 1949, in New York City, aged 75. He is interred in an unmarked mausoleum in Westchester Hills Cemetery located in Hastings-on-Hudson, New York.

The Stephen Wise Free Synagogue, which he founded in 1907 and served as Rabbi until his death, is named after him, as is Stephen S. Wise Temple in Los Angeles, which was founded by Rabbi Isaiah Zeldin in 1964. A street is named after him in Jerusalem next to the Israel Museum, and others in Haifa, Rishon LeZion and Petah Tikvah.

== See also ==
- American Jewish Congress
- Free Synagogue
- Jerome Davis (sociologist)
- Pittsburgh Platform
- Political Zionism
- Slattery Report
