= Arza (disambiguation) =

Arza may refer to:

- Arza, small populated town and township, east of Lhasa in the Tibet Autonomous Region of China
- Donaldo Arza, Panamanian middle-distance runner
- Juan Arza Iñigo, Spanish football forward and manager
- ARZA, Association of Reform Zionists of America

== See also ==
- Arsa (disambiguation)
- Arzah
- Azra (disambiguation)
