= Alexander M. Schindler =

Rabbi, Union of American Hebrew Congregations president

- Title: Rabbi

Personal life
- Born: October 4, 1925 Munich, Germany
- Died: November 15, 2000 (aged 75) Westport, Connecticut
- Spouse: Rhea Schindler
- Children: 5
- Parent(s): Eliezer Schindler, Sali Hoyda

Religious life
- Religion: Judaism
- Denomination: Reform Judaism

Jewish leader
- Predecessor: Maurice N. Eisendrath
- Successor: Eric Yoffie
- Position: President
- Organisation: Union of American Hebrew Congregations
- Began: 1973
- Ended: 1996

Alexander Moshe Schindler (October 4, 1925 – November 15, 2000) was a rabbi and the leading figure of American Jewry and Reform Judaism during the 1970s and 1980s. One of the last European-born leaders of American Reform Jewry, he served as president of the Union of American Hebrew Congregations (UAHC) for 23 years.

== Early life, military career, and education ==
Schindler was born on October 4, 1925, in Munich, Germany, to Sali and Eliezer Schindler. His father was a Yiddish poet of note, his mother a businesswoman. He had two older sisters, Eva and Hannah. He and his family fled the Nazis, first to Switzerland and then to America; Schindler arrived in the United States when he was twelve years old. The family settled in Washington Heights, Manhattan.

Schindler studied engineering until the outbreak of World War II, when he joined the U.S. Army's 10th Mountain Division Alpine Ski Patrol in Europe as a corporal. He later served as a forward observer for Army artillery. He was decorated with three combat ribbons for bravery and earned a Purple Heart and a Bronze Star for action in the Apennines of Italy. At the end of the war, he traveled from the Yugoslav border into Germany and was motivated to take up social issues after seeing Jews emerge from the Dachau concentration camp.

When Schindler returned to the United States after the war, he studied at the City College of New York, graduating in 1949. He also was engaged in the Jewish Theological Seminary, Hebrew Union College (the American Reform movement's seminary) and the New School. In 1953, Schindler graduated from the Hebrew Union College's Jewish Institute of Religion in Cincinnati, Ohio, with a master's degree in Hebrew letters. He was ordained as a rabbi the same year.

== Rabbinical career and leadership of the UAHC ==
Schindler's first posting was at Temple Emanuel in Worcester, Massachusetts (coincidentally, the same congregation that produced his successor at the UAHC, Eric Yoffie), where he served as Assistant Rabbi and later Associate Rabbi from 1953 to 1959. He married Rhea Rosenblum on September 29, 1956.

In 1959, Schindler moved to Boston and established the New England Coalition of Reform Synagogues. Later, Schindler moved to New York and was appointed director of the New England regional office of the Union of American Hebrew Congregations (later renamed the Union for Reform Judaism). Schindler became the UAHC's national director of education by 1963 and its vice president by 1967.

In 1973, Schindler became president of the Union of American Hebrew Congregations from 1973; he remained in that position until his retirement in 1996. His best known and most controversial pronouncement was his call for Jews to accept patrilineal descent (recognizing the children of Jewish fathers as Jewish). During his term, Schindler also "prodded the Reform Movement to participate fully in the Zionist world." His efforts are credited with the creation of the Association of Reform Zionists of America.

He served as chairman of the Conference of Presidents of Major American Jewish Organizations in the late 1970s. For his work on the peace process in Israel, he received the Solomon Bublick Award of the Hebrew University of Jerusalem.

In 1995, the book The Jewish Condition: Essays on Contemporary Judaism Honoring Rabbi Alexander M. Schindler, a collection of essays edited by Schindler and Aron Hirt-Manheimer, was published. The book contained, among other pieces, Rabbi Margaret Wenig's essay "Truly Welcoming Lesbian and Gay Jews"—the first published argument to the Jewish community on behalf of civil marriage for gay couples.

Schindler died at his home in Westport, Connecticut, on November 15, 2000, from a coronary arrest. At the time of his death he was president of the Memorial Foundation for Jewish Culture and vice president of the World Jewish Congress.
