= Abraham J. Feldman =

American rabbi (1893–1977)

Abraham Jehiel Feldman (June 28, 1893 – July 21, 1977) was a Ukrainian-born American rabbi.

== Life ==
Feldman was born on June 28, 1893, in Kyiv, Russian Empire, the son of Jehiel Feldman and Elka Rubin.

Feldman immigrated to America in 1906 and settled on the Lower East Side of Manhattan. While there, he attended the Baron de Hirsch School of the Educational Alliance. He graduated from the University of Cincinnati with a B.A. in 1917. He received a B.H.L. from Hebrew Union College, and in 1918 he was ordained a rabbi from there. Although he was a Zionist and the college's faculty was largely anti-Zionist, he received an honorary D.D. from there in 1944. Following his ordination, he served as a fellowship assistant at the Free Synagogue of Flushing in Flushing, Queens, a branch of the Stephen Wise Free Synagogue in New York City, from 1918 to 1919. He then ministered at Congregation Children of Israel in Athens, Georgia, from 1919 to 1920, followed by the Reform Congregation Keneseth Israel in Philadelphia, Pennsylvania, from 1920 to 1925. While he went to the latter congregation as an assistant rabbi under Rabbi Joseph Krauskopf, Krauskopf's illness in 1920 led him to take on most of the rabbinic duties. He was elected rabbi of Congregation Beth Israel in West Hartford, Connecticut, in 1925, and he served as rabbi there until his retirement in 1968.

Feldman was an associate editor of the English-Yiddish Encyclopedic Dictionary from 1910 to 1911 and editor an English translation of Zvi Hirsch Masliansky's Sermons in 1926. He also published twelve volumes of his own sermons. He wrote Judaism and Unitarianism in 1930, The Faith of a Liberal Jew in 1931, The American Jew in 1937, A Companion to the Bible in 1939, and The Rabbi and His Early Ministry in 1941. He was also the author of a tract called Contributions of Judaism to Modern Society, which was published by the Tract Commission of Union of American Hebrew Congregations (UAHC) in the 29th issue of the Popular Studies in Judaism. He was a contributor to the Universal Jewish Encyclopedia as well as historian and editor of the Bulletin of the Alumni Association of Hebrew Union College. He delivered the alumni lectures at Hebrew Union College on the subject of the rabbi and their early ministry in 1940, and in 1941 he was appointed chairman of the New England district of the National Town Hall Meeting Committee of the U. He was also president of the Jewish Ministers of Philadelphia, the Federation of Jewish School Teachers of Pennsylvania, the Jewish Teachers' Association of New England Liberal Schools, and the West Hartford Public Library.

During the New Deal, Feldman was educational director of the National Recovery Administration in Connecticut and State Chairman of the National Recovery Administration Adjustment Board. He founded the Connecticut Jewish Ledger with Samuel Neusner and served as its editor until 1977. He was president of the Central Conference of American Rabbis from 1947 to 1949 and the Synagogue Council of America from 1955 to 1957. He also wrote Why I am a Zionist in 1945 and American Reform Rabbi in 1965.

Seeing himself as a Jewish ambassador to the non-Jewish community, Feldman delivered an annual Thanksgiving message to the Hartford Rotary Club for 37 years, maintained extensive contact with the Christian clergy in the Hartford area, and taught a course on Judaism at the Hartford Theological Seminary every year. He was president of the Hartford Council for Adult Education, chaplain of the U.S. Veterans Hospital in Newington, a director of the Jewish Federation, the United Jewish Social Service Agency, and Mount Sinai Hospital, a member of the United War Community Fund of Connecticut, an advisory board member of the Salvation Army of Hartford, and a commissioner of the Hartford Fellowship Commission. He was also a member of the Board of Governors of Hebrew Union College, an executive council member of the UAHC, president of the Alumni Association of Hebrew Union College, a publications committee member of the Jewish Publication Society, a National Committee member of the Jewish Book Council, an administrative board member of the School of Religious Education of Hebrew Union College, and a member of the UAHC in New York City. As a member of UAHC's Committee on Ceremonies, he designed atarah a number of Reform rabbis used instead of a tallit, and he participated on the committee that revised the Union Prayer Book in 1940.

In 1955, Feldman was designated Citizen of the Year in Hartford and received the Connecticut Valley Council B'nai B'rith Americanism and Civic Award. He received a George Washington Honor Medal for the Freedoms Foundation in 1956, an Achievement Award in Freedom from Phi Epsilon Pi in 1959, the Silver Beaver Award from the Boy Scouts in 1961, and the Charter Oak Leadership Medal from the Greater Hartford Chamber of Commerce in 1964. In 1962, he was the first appointed Distinguished Alumni Professor of Hebrew Union College and became honorary rabbi of Temple Sinai in Newington (which he helped found). He also received an honorary S.T.D. degree from Trinity College, an honorary LL.D. degree from Hillyer College, and an honorary D.Hum. from Hartt College of Music. In 1914, he married Helen Bloch. Their children were Ella Norwood, Joan Helen Mecklenburger, and Daniel.

== Death ==
Feldman died at home from a brief illness on July 21, 1977. Nearly 900 people attended his funeral at Congregation Beth Israel, including all the rabbis in Greater Hartford, Governor Ella Grasso, Lieutenant Governor Robert K. Killian, Adjutant General John F. Freund, West Hartford Mayor Anne Streeter, key business and political leaders, Archbishop John F. Whealon, and National Conference of Churches executive director David Mellon. Eight state troopers formed an honor guard in recognition of his service as Jewish chaplain for the Connecticut State Police. He was buried in the Beth Israel Cemetery in Hartford.
