= Channing Heggie Tobias =

American civil rights activist

Channing Tobias
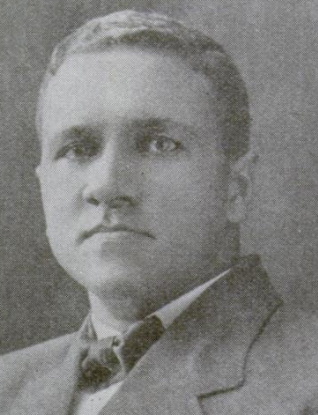

Chair of the National Association for the Advancement of Colored People
- In office 1953–1960
- Preceded by: Louis T. Wright
- Succeeded by: Robert C. Weaver

Personal details
- Born: Channing Heggie Tobias; February 1, 1882 Augusta, Georgia, U.S.
- Died: November 5, 1961 (aged 79) New York City, New York, U.S.
- Education: Paine College (BA); Drew University (BDiv); University of Pennsylvania

Channing Heggie Tobias (February 1, 1882 in Augusta, Georgia – November 5, 1961 in Manhattan, NY) was a civil rights activist and 1948 Spingarn Medalist. In 1946 he was appointed to the President's Committee on Civil Rights. He has been called "the Booker T. Washington of his day".

Tobias was orphaned young, brought up by a widowed friend of his mother's. He attended public schools in Augusta.

He received his BA from Paine College in 1902 and went on to Drew Seminary. He was ordained in the Colored Methodist Episcopal Church in 1911. Tobias was on the faculty of Paine College for six years, teaching biblical literature. From 1911 to 1946 he was active in the YMCA and race-related issues involving it. While chairman of the committee on race relations for the 1937 YMCA World Conference in India he met Mahatma Gandhi. In addition he was on the board of trustees of the NAACP and later became its chairman.

In 1945, Tobias participated in the development of the New York State Fair Employment Law, and the following year he became director of the Phelps-Stokes Fund. He was an alternate delegate to the General Assembly of the United Nations meeting in 1951. When he became NAACP chairman in 1953, Tobias launched the Fight for Freedom Fund to eliminate state-imposed racial segregation by the time of the centennial of the Emancipation Proclamation. He resigned from the New York State Commission Against Discrimination in protest at the slowness of passing anti-discrimination legislation.

Tobias was a member of Alpha Phi Alpha fraternity. He was the first African-American awarded an honorary degree from New York University, and received honorary degrees from the Theological Institute (Georgia), Morehouse College, the Jewish Institute of Religion, and the New School for Social Research.

== Literature ==
- Autobiographical essay in Finkelstein, L. (ed.) Thirteen Americans: Their Spiritual Autobiographies, Institute for Religious and Social Science, 1953, pp. 177–200
- BlackPast.org entry
