= Abraham Binder =

American composer and synagogue music director

Abraham Wolf Binder
- Abraham Wolf Binder
- Born: January 1895; New York City, U.S.
- Died: October 1966 (aged 71); New York City, U.S.
- Occupations: Composer, conductor, educator
- Known for: Development of American Jewish liturgical music

Abraham Wolf Binder (January 1895 – October 1966) was an American composer, conductor, educator, and a leading figure in the development of American Jewish liturgical music.

== Early life and education ==
Binder was born on the Lower East Side of New York City into a family of cantorial background. His father was a baal tefillah who had learned synagogue music from his own father, a cantor in Galicia (Eastern Europe). At age four Binder began singing in his father's synagogue choir, and from age seven to fourteen he sang as an alto soloist in the professional choir of Cantor Abraham Frachtenberg. Frachtenberg's emphasis on choral discipline and composition strongly influenced Binder's later approach to synagogue music. At fourteen Binder became choir director of the Kamenitzer Schul in Manhattan under Cantor Abraham Singer. He studied piano, organ, and harmony, attended Townsend Harris High School, and pursued further studies at Columbia University and the New York College of Music, receiving a Bachelor of Music degree in 1920.

== Early career ==
In 1911 Binder became organist and choir director of Temple Beth-El in Greenpoint, Brooklyn, and in 1913 assumed the same role at Temple Adath Israel in the Bronx. In 1916 he founded the Hadassah Choral Union, one of the first American choral groups devoted to the music of Palestinian Jews’ Hebrew songs. He arranged and harmonized Zionist songs for concert performance, contributing to the spread of Hebrew song culture in the United States.

== 92nd Street Y and Jewish cultural institutions ==
In 1917 Binder was invited to organize the music department of the 92nd Street YM-YWHA in New York. There he established a choral society and symphonic workshop and developed programming that integrated Jewish music into broader American concert life. He remained associated with the institution for nearly fifty years. At the same time he served as music director of the religious school at Temple Emanu-El of New York, where he began composing and arranging Reform liturgical music.

== Jewish Institute of Religion and Stephen Wise Free Synagogue ==
In 1921 Rabbi Stephen S. Wise met Binder after a concert at the 92Y and invited him to join the faculty of the newly organized Jewish Institute of Religion as instructor in Jewish music. In 1922 Binder became choirmaster of the Free Synagogue (later the Stephen Wise Free Synagogue), a position he held until his death in 1966. Binder was among the early Reform synagogue musicians to reintroduce traditional nusach (Jewish music) and cantillation into Reform worship during the 1920s. In 1931 he was appointed Professor of Jewish Liturgical Music at the Jewish Institute of Religion. Following the merger of JIR with Hebrew Union College in 1947, he continued as Professor of Jewish Liturgical Music and later taught at the School of Sacred Music.

== Union Hymnal and national leadership ==
In 1929 Binder was appointed chair of the music committee for the third edition of the Union Hymnal of the Central Conference of American Rabbis. The revised hymnal shaped Reform synagogue music for decades. He was a co-founder of the National Jewish Music Council in 1944 and played a central role in establishing the annual Jewish Music Festival. In 1963 he founded the Jewish Liturgical Music Society.

== Compositions and writings ==
Binder composed extensively for synagogue, choral, educational, and concert settings. His first full Sabbath service was published in 1928. His 1952 liturgical work Sabbath for Israel (Shabbat le-Yisrael) became widely used in Reform congregations. He also composed orchestral works, chamber music, and choral compositions, and collected and arranged Jewish folk songs. His lecture The Jewish Music Movement in America, originally delivered in 1952 and later published, documented the development of Jewish musical life in the United States.

== Honors and death ==
In 1960 Binder received the Frank L. Weil Award from the National Jewish Welfare Board for distinguished contribution to American Jewish culture. In 1965 the Jewish Music Festival was dedicated to his life and work. On September 23, 1966, Binder collapsed while conducting Kol Nidre services at the Stephen Wise Free Synagogue and died in October 1966.

== Works ==
Binder composed extensively for synagogue liturgy, festival services, choral concert performance, chamber music, orchestral works, and educational use.

=== Complete and extended liturgical settings ===
- Oneg Shabbat (1932)
- Rinnath Shabbath (1934)
- Tifereth Tefillah (1934)
- Kabbalat Shabbat (1940)
- Friday Evening Service
- Menuhat Ahavah (1954)
- Shabbat le-Yisrael (Sabbath for Israel) (1952)

=== High Holy Day works ===
Binder composed settings for the Days of Awe incorporating traditional cantillation and choral writing.

- Seder Avodah
- Kol Nidre settings
- High Holy Day responses and congregational settings

=== Festival and biblical settings ===
- Settings for Passover liturgy
- Festival Psalm settings
- Purim-related compositions and choral materials
- Settings drawn from the Book of Esther (Purim repertory)

=== Service components and responses ===
Binder wrote numerous individual liturgical movements intended for incorporation into Reform services.

- Adon Olam
- Adoration
- Hashkivenu
- Ahavat Olam
- V’shamru
- Barekhu
- Shema Yisrael
- Va’anachnu
- May the Words of My Mouth

=== Choral concert works ===
Binder composed concert works for synagogue and secular Jewish performance contexts.

- Israel Reborn (choral poem)
- Requiem–Yizkor
- Kindling the Sabbath Lights
- Etz Hayyim Hi
- Grant Us Peace
- Three Responses (Set III)

=== Orchestral and chamber music ===
In addition to liturgical works, Binder composed instrumental music reflecting Jewish thematic material and broader symphonic forms.

- Two Hassidic Moods (string quartet)
- Orchestral suites (various)
- Symphonic workshop compositions for the 92nd Street Y

=== Folk song arrangements and collections ===
Binder was an early American arranger of Palestinian Hebrew and Yiddish folk songs.

- Arrangements of Palestinian Hebrew songs (1916–1920s)
- Zionist choral harmonizations for the Hadassah Choral Union
- Arrangements of Yiddish folk songs

=== Editorial and scholarly works ===
- Chair, music committee, Third Edition of the Union Hymnal (Central Conference of American Rabbis)
- The Jewish Music Movement in America (lecture delivered 1952; published 1954; expanded edition 1975)
