= Elder of Ziyon =

American pro-Israel blog

Elder of Ziyon is an American pro-Israel blog. It is written anonymously.

== Blog name ==
According to the blog's FAQ, the blog's name is an ironic reference to the antisemitic hoax The Protocols of the Elders of Zion, which claims Jews control the world. The blog's writer, known as "Elder", explains that the name of the blog "is meant to be ironic, of course. Now it makes it a little harder for me to be taken seriously by the media at large - on one occasion, The Jerusalem Post edited out a reference to me because it sounded too weird (the reporter told me that)."

== Reputation ==
According to The Jewish Journal of Greater Los Angeles the blog "serves as a watchdog against anti-Zionism."

The American Zionist Movement has described Elder as "perhaps the most quoted blogger in the area of Middle East politics". The blog had a high rank on Technorati.

On September 13, 2013 The Jerusalem Report published the article Battle of the Bloggers, which called Elder of Ziyon "perhaps the most influential" pro-Israel blog.

== Impact ==
In 2016 McGraw-Hill discontinued a widely used textbook after Elder of Ziyon started a campaign against a map alleged to show the progressive loss of land by the Palestinians since 1946. In response, Jewish Voice for Peace organized a letter by 35 prominent academics accusing the publisher of censorship.

In April 2013 the blog published a scoop revealing that writers for MIFTAH, a nonprofit founded in 1998 by Palestinian leader Hanan Ashrawi were repeating a centuries-old smear over the Passover holiday on their Arabic Web site, accusing Jews of using Christian blood to prepare the Passover matzoh, causing The Algemeiner Journal to name the blog as one of its Jewish 100.

== Israel advocacy panel discussion ==
On May 21, 2012 the American Zionist Movement sponsored a program that focused on pro-Israel advocacy. The panel discussion was called Israel in the Write Light, and "Elder" appeared at the panel discussion.

== Other highlights ==
In February 2022, Elder of Ziyon published his book Protocols: Exposing Modern Antisemitism.

In December 2024, Elder of Ziyon published a collection of his political cartoons in He's An Anti-Zionist Too!: Cartoons by Elder of Ziyon

In March 2026, under the name Eldad Tzioni, Elder of Ziyon published At Ptach Lo: An Analytical Haggadah.

In May 2026, under the name Eldad Tzioni, Elder of Ziyon published his book Reclaiming The Covenant: America's Remarkable 250 Years And Assuring It Continues

Besides original articles, the blog is known for its cartoon posters (including the "Apartheid?" series, which has been used on many campuses).
