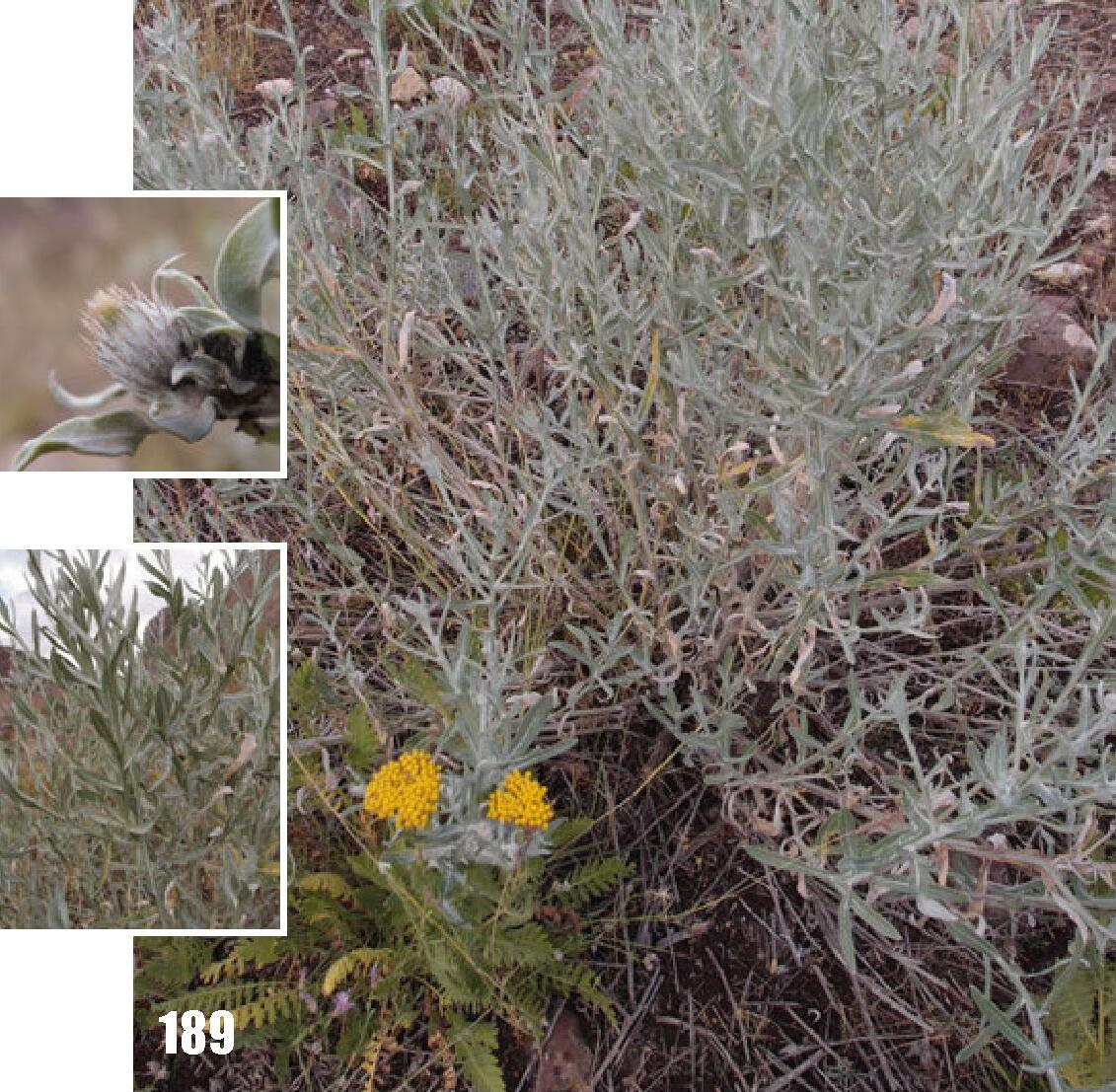
- Anacantha darwasica

Scientific classification
- Kingdom: Plantae
- Clade: Embryophytes
- Clade: Tracheophytes
- Clade: Angiosperms
- Clade: Eudicots
- Clade: Asterids
- Order: Asterales
- Family: Asteraceae
- Subfamily: Carduoideae
- Tribe: Cardueae
- Subtribe: Carduinae
- Genus: Anacantha (Iljin) Soják

Synonyms
- Modestia Kharadze & Tamamsch. 1956, illegitimate homonym, not Modesta Raf. 1838 (Convolvulaceae); Cirsium section Anacantha Iljin

= Anacantha =

Genus of flowering plants

Anacantha is a group of thistles in the daisy family, first described as a genus in 1956 with the name Modestia. This was later to be regarded as an illegitimate homonym, and so in 1982 the name was changed to Anacantha.

The entire genus is native to Tajikistan and Uzbekistan.

== Species ==
As of May 2024, Plants of the World Online accepted two species:

- Anacantha darwasica (C.Winkl.) Soják – Tajikistan, Uzbekistan
- Anacantha mira (Iljin) Soják – Uzbekistan
