= Eric Yoffie =

American Reform rabbi

- Born: 1947 (age 78–79); United States
- Occupation: Rabbi

Eric H. Yoffie is a Reform rabbi, and President Emeritus of the Union for Reform Judaism (URJ). He was the head of the URJ denomination from 1996 to 2012. Following his retirement in 2012, he has been a lecturer and writer; his writings appear regularly in The Huffington Post, The Jerusalem Post, and Haaretz.

== Family and career ==
Rabbi Yoffie was raised in Worcester, Massachusetts, where his family belonged to Temple Emanuel, and he was involved in the North American Federation of Temple Youth (NFTY). He was president in the Northeast Region of NFTY before becoming the organization's Vice President in 1965–1966.

After high school, Yoffie spent one year at Stanford University before graduating from Brandeis University. He received his semikhah from Hebrew Union College in New York in 1974. He served congregations in Lynbrook, New York and Durham, North Carolina, before joining the URJ as director of the Midwest Council in 1980. In 1983 he was named Executive Director of the Association of Reform Zionists of America (ARZA). In 1992 he became vice president of the URJ and director of the Commission on Social Action. In addition, he served as executive editor of the Reform Judaism magazine. On July 1, 1996, he succeeded Rabbi Alexander M. Schindler as president of the Union for Reform Judaism. In 1999 The Jewish Daily Forward named Yoffie the number one Jewish leader in America.

In 2009 Newsweek named him #8 on its list of "50 Influential Rabbis."

He is married to Amy Jacobson Yoffie. The couple has two children, and reside in Westfield, New Jersey.

On June 10, 2010, Rabbi Yoffie announced his intention to step down from the post of president of the URJ at the age of 65, in June 2012. He was succeeded by Rabbi Rick Jacobs.

== Views on Jewish life ==
Rabbi Yoffie has promoted increased traditionalism within Reform Judaism, encouraging greater focus on Jewish text study and prayer. Jonathan Sarna observed that Yoffie, during his presidency of the URJ, urged Reform Jews to enrich their spiritual lives and expand their knowledge of Judaism.

During his tenure, Yoffie announced two major worship initiatives. The first, in 1999, aimed to help congregations become "houses in which we pray with joy." The second, introduced eight years later, encouraged individual Shabbat observance and urged congregations to rethink Shabbat morning worship. He also supported lifelong Jewish study by helping synagogues develop programs to enhance adult Jewish literacy. In 2005, he introduced the Sacred Choices curriculum, which focused on teaching sexual ethics to teenagers in Reform camps and congregations.

In his recent writings, Yoffie has opposed Jewish secularism and cultural interpretations of Judaism. He has stated that a religiously grounded Judaism is essential to the future of the Jewish community.

== Views on interfaith relations ==
Rabbi Yoffie initiated dialogue programs between the URJ and both Christians and Muslims. In 2005, he was the first Jew to address the Churchwide Assembly of the Evangelical Lutheran Church in America. Later that year, he accepted an invitation from Rev. Jerry Falwell to speak at Liberty University, becoming the first rabbi to address a university-wide convocation there. In his remarks, he discussed shared values of family and morality, as well as differences, including church-state separation and gay marriage, which drew boos from some students.

On August 21, 2007, Rabbi Yoffie became the first leader of a major Jewish organization to address the convention of the Islamic Society of North America. He spoke about ignorance of Islam among Jews and Christians in North America and called for mutual understanding. He suggested that Jews and Muslims educate each other about their respective faiths and work to overcome stereotyping. Yoffie later supported Park51 and advocated for the rights of Muslim Americans.

Rabbi Yoffie has expressed opposition to atheism, stating that it lacks "humility, imagination, and curiosity."

== Views on social justice ==
As President of the Union for Reform Judaism (URJ), Rabbi Yoffie addressed a range of social justice issues. He opposed the death penalty, supported LGBTQ+ rights, and advocated for gun control. He was the only religious leader to speak at the Million Mom March, where he stated that "the indiscriminate distribution of guns is an offense against God and humanity." He further remarked that "our gun-flooded society has turned weapons into idols, and the worship of idols must be recognized for what it is—blasphemy. And the only appropriate religious response to blasphemy is sustained moral outrage."

== Relationship with Israel ==
Rabbi Yoffie has focused much of his public efforts on supporting the State of Israel and strengthening the relationship between Israel and American Jews. As President of the URJ, he met frequently with Israeli officials to convey the concerns of the Reform movement and North American Jewry. He has been an advocate for religious freedom and pluralism in Israel, maintaining that Judaism should be promoted through education and persuasion rather than coercion.

In June 2006, Rabbi Yoffie declined to meet with then-Israeli President Moshe Katsav after Katsav refused to address him with the title "rabbi." This decision highlighted the Israeli Chief Rabbinate's policy of not recognizing non-Orthodox rabbinic ordinations.

In 2014, Rabbi Yoffie questioned presidential candidate Reuven Rivlin on whether he would address Reform rabbis by their title. Rivlin did not address the issue directly during his candidacy.

== Contemporary spirituality ==
Rabbi Yoffie has written on belief and spirituality in American life, addressing topics such as sin, atheism, community, immigration, health care, and economic justice from a progressive religious perspective. In What it Means to be a Liberal Person of Faith and other writings, he stated that progressive religion has a role in the modern era.
