= Ora Pescovitz =

American pediatric endocrinologist and academic administrator

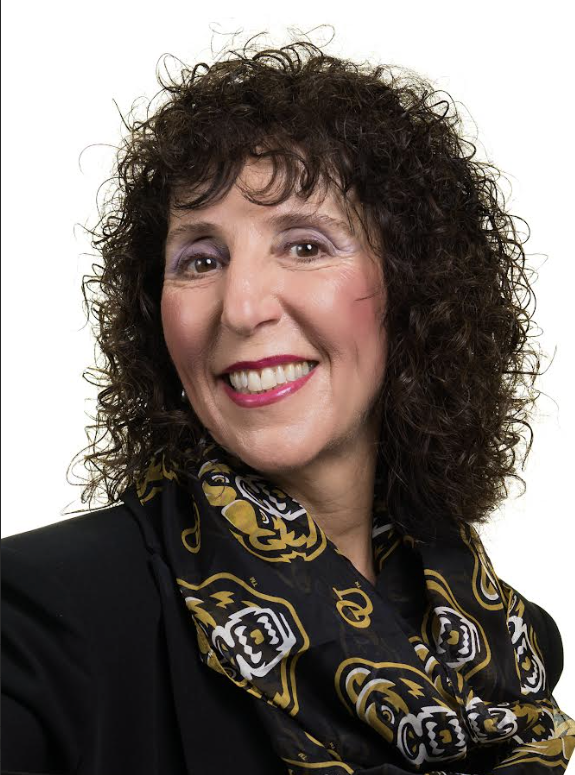

7th President of Oakland University
- Incumbent
- Assumed office July 2017
- Preceded by: George Hynd

Personal details
- Born: Ora Hirsch
- Spouse: Mark Pescovitz
- Relations: Ammiel Hirsch (brother)
- Children: 3
- Education: Hebrew University of Jerusalem; Northwestern University

Ora Hirsch Pescovitz is an American pediatric endocrinologist and academic administrator serving as the seventh president of Oakland University since July 2017. She previously held leadership positions at the Eli Lilly and Company and the University of Michigan. Pescovitz worked at the Indiana University for 21 years.

== Early life and education ==
Pescovitz was born on September 23, 1956, in Chicago, Illinois, to a Jewish family. Her mother was born in Poland and grew up in Soviet Russia during World War II; after the war, she spent two years in displaced persons camps in Europe before moving to Israel and later to America. Her father was Rabbi Richard G. Hirsch, who was the founding director of the Religious Action Center of Reform Judaism and was actively involved in the civil rights struggle. The Civil Rights Act of 1964 and Voting Rights Act of 1965 were drafted in his office. He marched in Selma with Martin Luther King Jr. and preached at Brown A.M.E Chapel. He was also a committed Zionist and is credited with having the led Reform movement to become Zionist.

Pescovitz's brother, Rabbi Ammiel Hirsch, serves as the senior rabbi at the Stephen Wise Free Synagogue. Pescovitz grew up in Bethesda, Maryland, with a strong commitment to social justice, having personally witnessed significant moments in American history, such seeing Martin Luther King Jr. deliver his "I Have a Dream" speech.

She credits her upbringing in a family dedicated to social justice and Jewish leadership with later influencing her approach to her roles in higher education and healthcare. Pescovitz completed the Honours Program in Medical Education at Northwestern University, earning a Bachelor of Medical Science in 1978 before achieving her M.D. from Northwestern University's Feinberg School of Medicine. In 1979, she started her pediatrics residency at the University of Minnesota Hospitals and completed training at Children's National Medical Center. She also completed a research fellowship in pediatric endocrinology at the National Institutes of Health (NIH).

== Career ==
Her research has primarily focused on understanding the physiological and molecular mechanisms responsible for disorders of growth and puberty, and she has also contributed to the development of new therapies for these conditions. During her 21-year tenure at Indiana University, she served in several roles, including executive associate dean for research affairs at the Indiana University School of Medicine and president and CEO of Riley Hospital for Children. She acted as interim vice president for research administration at Indiana University.

From 2009 to 2014, Pescovitz was the executive vice president for medical affairs and health system CEO at the University of Michigan. In this role, she oversaw a health system comprising three hospitals, over 120 health centers and clinics, and the University of Michigan Medicine. Her responsibilities included managing $3.3 billion in revenue and overseeing $490 million in research funding. From 2014 to 2017, Pescovitz held a leadership position at Eli Lilly and Company, where she served as senior vice president and U.S. medical leader for Lilly Biomedicines. Her responsibilities involved managing real-world evidence-based research and building partnerships with large health systems. She has served as president of both the Society for Pediatric Research and the North American Pediatric Endocrine Society. She held leadership positions in several national healthcare organizations, including the National Institutes of Health (NIH) Advisory Board for Clinical Research and the National Association of Children's Hospitals and Related Institutions (NACHRI).

In July 2017, Pescovitz became the seventh president of Oakland University. She is the second Jewish president in the school's history. One of her first initiatives as president was the creation of the position of chief diversity officer to oversee the university's Office of Diversity, Equity, and Inclusion (DEI). However, in 2024, she critiqued DEI frameworks for unintentionally excluding Jewish students, emphasizing the need for reform to prevent divisiveness.

In September 2023, her contract was extended to June 2031. In 2024, she donated $1.33 million to the Pescovitz Presidential Scholarship, a program which offers "direct scholarship support to academically exceptional high school graduates". Pescovitz also serves as the chair of the board of directors for the Horizon League, a collegiate athletic conference affiliated with the NCAA.

In a 2024 report by the American Enterprise Institute ranking 446 college presidents who served between 2000 and 2023, Pescovitz, was ranked 37th overall. However, among the 134 of those who were still in their presidential roles at the time of the report, Pescovitz ranked at 11th.

== Personal life ==
Pescovitz was married Mark Pescovitz who was a transplant surgeon at Indiana University. She has three children. Pescovitz is currently partnered with Daniel Walsh, a cardiologist at the Corewell Health.
