= Eliezer Schindler =

Yiddish author

- אליעזר שינדלער
- Born: 1892; Tyczyn, Poland
- Died: 1957; Worcester, Massachusetts, U.S.
- Citizenship: Austria, United States
- Occupations: Writer, poet
- Spouse: Sali Schindler
- Partner: Sali Schindler
- Children: Dr. Eva Schindler Oles, Rabbi Alexander Schindler, Hannah Schindler Nuba
- Writing career
- Language: Yiddish
- Years active: 1912–1957
- Website: www.eliezerschindler.com

Eliezer Schindler (Yiddish: אליעזר שינדלער; 1892–1957) was a Jewish writer, poet, and activist. He wrote 31 books in Yiddish.

== Biography ==
Schindler was born in a Hasidic family in Tyczyn, Poland, and grew up in Munich. There, he took part in the work of numerous Yiddishist and Zionist organizations and had his first poetry book published in 1912. Two years later, he was drafted by the Austro-Hungarian Army and took part in World War I. He was wounded in battle and captured by the Russians as a prisoner of war.

He spent over three years in Siberia, Kazakhstan and the Lower Volga, traveling between villages and working at farms. Eventually, he moved to Astrakhan by the Caspian Sea. There, he met a group of Subbotniks, i.e. aspiring converts to Judaism of Slavic background. He helped them learn Hebrew and taught them Judaism and Zionist ideas. Schindler's poetry books Fun step un yishuv and Lider, published in 1922 and 1929, respectively, include a number of poems about his time in Astrakhan and nearby rural areas such as Geyrem ("Gerim"), Baym Yaroslan ("By the River Yeruslan") and Kirgiznhoyf ("Kyrgyz Farm").

Schindler's poetry reflects Astrakhan's high degree of ethnic diversity and its "Oriental" atmosphere. In his poem Akhsanye in step ("Inn in the Steppe"), Schindler described the great variety of peoples he had met during his time in the region: Kazakhs, Kalmyks, Tatars, Ukrainians, Russians, Estonians, Latvians, Circassians, Romanis, Germans, Mokshas and others. In his later writing, Schindler would often retell the folk legends from various cultures he had heard while traveling.

After the end of World War I, Schindler returned to Munich where he worked as a Hebrew teacher and had his first child, Hannah Schindler Nuba, with Sally Lichtman. There he also met his future wife, Sali, with whom he later emigrated to the United States and bought a chicken farm in Lakewood Township, New Jersey. He had his second and third children with Sali, Dr. Eva Schindler Oles and Rabbi Alexander Schindler, president of the Union of American Hebrew Congregations from 1973 to 1996.

Schindler was a student of the Austrian Jewish philosopher and Zionist activist Nathan Birnbaum. He was an active member of the Bais Yaakov movement, for which he wrote an anthem and a number of textbooks.
