= Free Synagogue of Flushing =

Reform synagogue in Queens, New York

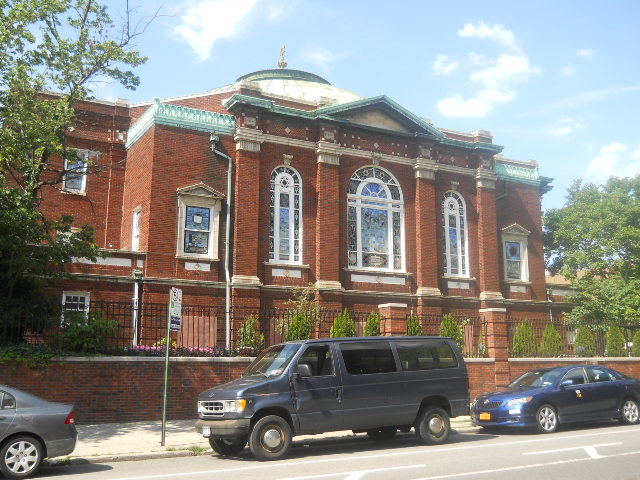
- The synagogue as seen from Kissena Boulevard and Sanford Avenue

- Location in New York City

Religion
- Affiliation: Reform Judaism
- Ecclesiastical or organisational status: Synagogue
- Status: Active

Location
- Location: 41-60 Kissena Boulevard, Flushing, Queens, New York City, New York 11355
- Country: United States
- Coordinates: 40°45′33″N 73°49′40″W

Architecture
- Architect: Maurice Courland
- Type: Synagogue
- Style: Neoclassical
- Established: 1917 (as a congregation)
- Completed: 1921

Specifications
- Dome: One
- Materials: Masonry, copper, timber, asphalt

Website
- freesynagogueflushing.org
- Free Synagogue of Flushing
- U.S. National Register of Historic Places
- Area: less than one acre
- NRHP reference No.: 09000834
- Added to NRHP: October 16, 2009

The Free Synagogue of Flushing is a Reform Jewish congregation and historic synagogue located at 41-60 Kissena Boulevard in the Flushing neighborhood of Queens in New York City, New York, United States. The synagogue's establishment is based on the free synagogue movement, started by Stephen Samuel Wise. The building was added to the National Register of Historic Places in 2009.

== Early history ==
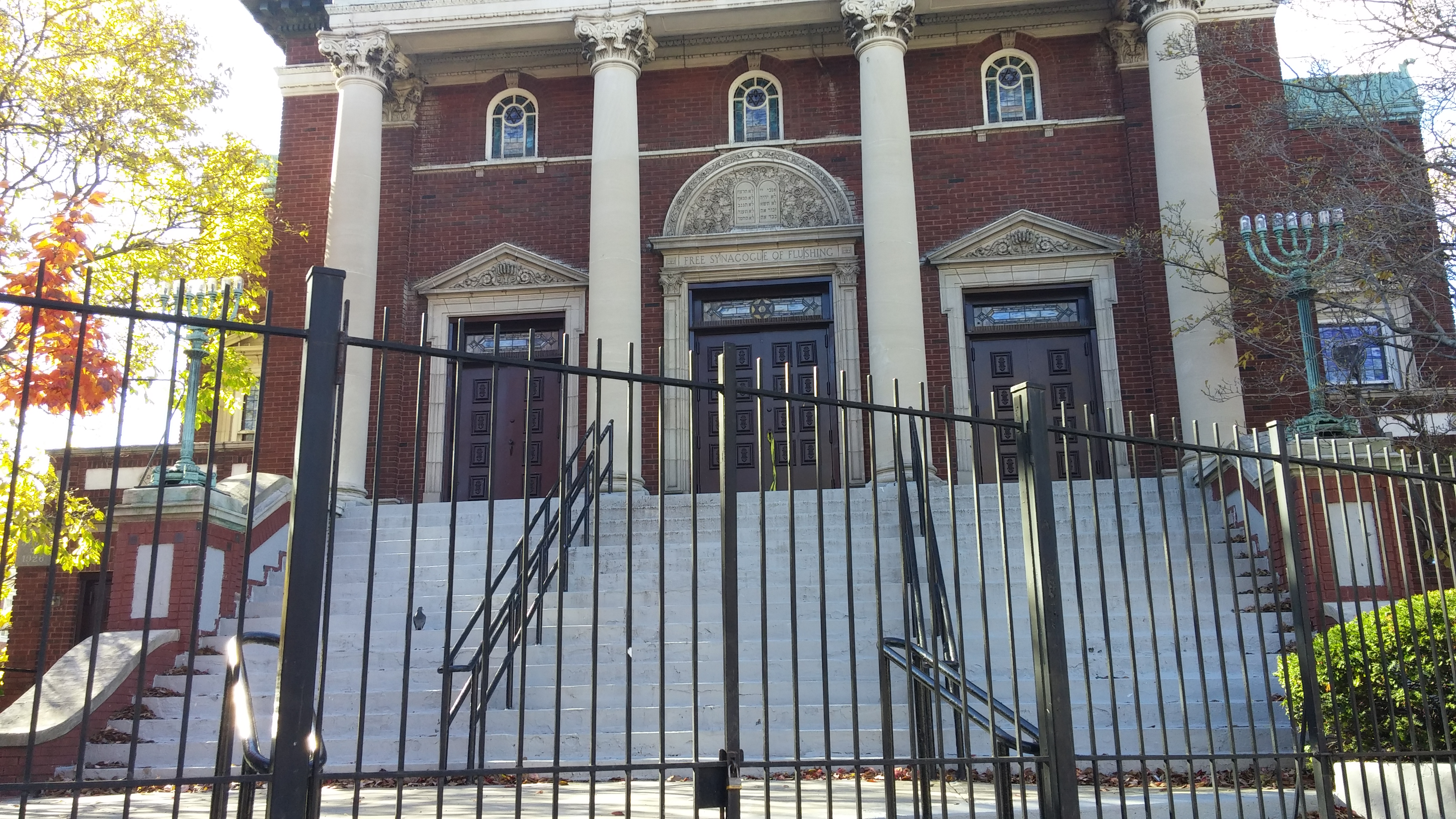
Exterior

The Free Synagogue of Flushing was founded in 1917 on Sanford Avenue by the Hebrew Women's Aid Society, in keeping with the philosophy of the first Free Synagogue, the Stephen Wise Free Synagogue in Manhattan. In the New York Tribune in 1906, an interview with Rabbi Wise explained his plans and meaning of "free synagogue": "The Free Synagogue will, as its name implies, be free in so far as its pulpit will be free and untrammeled, free to voice without free or scruple the high moral and spiritual teachings of the synagogue. It will thus do much to regain the moral support, which church and synagogue alike, alas! are losing or have lost." These principles include freedom of the pulpit, freedom in religious philosophy, freedom in terms of seating, and men and women are equal in participation and leadership. For much of its history, the synagogue has been a bastion of liberal thought and social activism. It is the oldest Reform congregation in Queens.

When the synagogue was established with the aid of Rabbi Sidney Goldstein of the Stephen Wise Free Synagogue, it purchased the white house at the then quiet intersection of Kissena Boulevard and Sanford Avenue. The first synagogue was a stately pillared mansion designed by the architectural firm of McKim, Mead & White, which stood on the corner of the lot. Some years later, the synagogue membership had grown so large it was decided a new sanctuary had to be built. During World War I, the Hebrew Women's Aid Society commissioned the architect Maurice Courland to build a synagogue on Kissena Boulevard.

During its early years, the synagogue was served by three rabbis for relatively short periods of time. They included Rabbi Bernard Cantor, who left on a mission for the Joint Distribution Committee to help oppressed Jews in Eastern Europe. While doing his humanitarian work, Cantor was murdered by bandits in southern Russia. The anniversary of his death is still observed.

Cantor was succeeded by Rabbi Abraham J. Feldman, who later went to Hartford, Connecticut, and he in turn was followed by Rabbi Maxwell Silver, a brother of Rabbi Abba Hillel Silver, the famed Zionist and counselor to a number of American presidents. When Silver left in 1922, the temple turned to Wise for help, and he selected Rabbi Max Meyer to serve on a "temporary basis", which lasted 40 years. Meyer was the prime mover in the growth and development of the Free Synagogue of Flushing. He also served as chairman of the North Shore branch of the Long Island division of the American Jewish Congress.

Rabbi Charles Agin came to Flushing in 1958 to assist Meyer, and quickly gained the affection and confidence of the congregation. A year later, Rabbi Agin received an officer's commission and was inducted into the Armed Forces. When he returned, Rabbi Agin was named assistant rabbi and principal of the religious school, and at the retirement of Meyer, he was named to succeed him and was granted life tenure. During his 50 years of service, Rabbi Agin presided over expansion of the temple, including a new administration building, the Rabbi Max Meyer Religious School which supports children 6 through 16 with an after school Hebrew education and other facilities. He is emeritus Dean of Mesifta Adath Wolkowisk.

== Events since 2000 ==
Michael Weisser joined as rabbi in September 2008, when the synagogue had around 100 members, down from several hundred decades earlier. A graduate of Hebrew Union College's cantorial program in the 1970s, he was ordained in 2001. He has participated in the planning and execution of the Queens Unity Walk, which brings together people of various faiths for a day of learning. He is currently involved in the creation of an interfaith council that will serve the ethnically and religiously diverse borough of Queens. Recently, he was among those chosen to deliver an invocation at New York City Mayor Michael Bloomberg’s Interfaith Breakfast.

When Weisser was a cantor in Lincoln, Nebraska, Larry Trapp, the Grand Dragon of the White Knights of the Ku Klux Klan threatened him and his family. The rabbi's response was to reach out to the one behind the threats. He ultimately befriended Mr. Trapp and was instrumental in changing him from a lifelong racist to a renouncer of hatred who spoke out publicly against bigotry. Three months before his death from diabetes-related kidney disease in 1992, Trapp converted to Judaism under Rabbi Weisser's guidance, in the very same synagogue he once plotted to blow up. A book was written about these events; dramatised by Michael Ching's 2012 opera called Slaying the Dragon. Rabbi Weisser retired in June 2016 and returned to Nebraska.

Nationally known Steven Pearlston, a professional opera singer and director, was the synagogue's cantor and music director for 35 years until his resignation in July 2014. He possessed a broad knowledge of the full range of the Jewish liturgical, classical and secular musical repertoires, as well as Jewish history and philosophy. He was the cantor of the only synagogue in Queens which had a professional choir at all services. The choir performed behind an ornate grate above the pink marbled Ark. During the first 47 years, the synagogue did not have a cantor with the rabbi conducting services and the congregation singing the responses. In 1923, it obtained an organ which ranks in quality with some of the finest organs in Europe.

As of August 2022, the Free Synagogue of Flushing was led by Rabbi Nathan Alfred, who previously administered to Reform congregations in Luxemburg, Singapore and Israel, and Cantor Alan Brava, also the congregation's executive director. The Free Synagogue of Flushing has an active youth and adult education program. It provides space to various political, community organizations, and fledgling church groups. Throughout its history, the synagogue has remained active in social action causes. Every year, it commemorates Martin Luther King Jr.'s birthday in its sanctuary and hosts interfaith events. Since 2020, the Synagogue has had an active food drive for its surrounding community, and it served as vaccination site during the COVID-19 pandemic.

== Beliefs ==
=== Marriage ===
The synagogue has an inclusive vision and celebrates both opposite-sex marriages and same-sex marriages.

== Current building ==
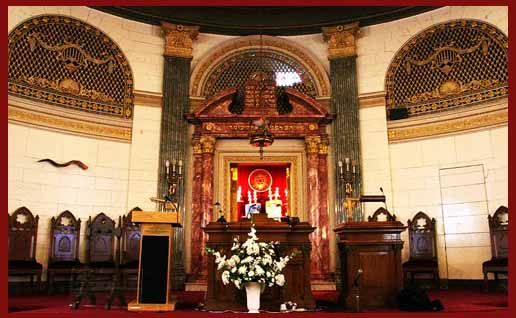
Interior

The white Victorian-style building that White built was moved in 1926 to the Sanford Avenue frontage of the synagogue to make way for a larger sanctuary, the present Free Synagogue of Flushing. This neoclassical building designed by Maurice Courland, who is a specialist in synagogue design, features a large portico supported by four Ionic pillars. The interior is ringed by dark green pilasters, and covered by a dome. The building is decorated with ornamental Judaic motifs, such as a seven-branched menorah right outside the doors of the synagogue. Tiffany style stained glass windows made in Czechoslovakia bathe the sanctuary in rich, radiant colors. Inscribed in the front is the verse "FOR MINE HOUSE SHALL BE CALLED A HOUSE OF PRAYER FOR ALL PEOPLE" (Isaiah 56:7).

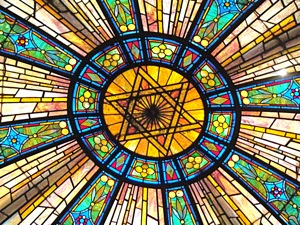
Dome over the Sanctuary of the Free Synagogue of Flushing

The windows depict Noah's Ark, the lions of Judah, great swirls of leaves and vines and delicate flowers used in the Sukkot prayer, and the two hands of the Priestly Blessing. In the center of the domed ceiling that covers the entire sanctuary is a smaller stained-glass dome designed around a Star of David and intricate, gold-leaf filigree, hand-turned and carved, graces the wood that is a dark green color. It is a synagogue-in-the-round which provides a sense of intimacy during its spiritual services. In 1964, a three-story school building was added to accommodate the religious school and adult education classes. It is listed on both the New York State and National Register of Historic Places.

In 2009-2011 the synagogue building underwent an extensive renovation. The new windows, on the south side of the temple near Sanford Avenue are the latest part of the ongoing repairs. The New York Landmarks Conservancy awarded their first-ever Historic Synagogue Fund award for the restoration of its monumental stained glass windows and wood sash, and in December 2011, the synagogue dedicated its new stained glass windows with prayers led by Rabbi Michael S. Weisser.

== See also ==
- Stephen Wise Free Synagogue
