= President's Committee on Civil Rights =

United States Committee on the issue of Civil Rights

History
- Established by: Harry Truman on December 5, 1946
- Disbanded: December 1947
- Related Executive Order number(s): 9808, 9980, 9981

Membership
- Chairperson: Charles Edward Wilson
- Other committee members: Sadie T. Alexander; James B. Carey; John Sloan Dickey; Morris Ernst; Roland B. Gittelsohn; Frank Porter Graham; Francis J. Haas; Charles Luckman; Francis P. Matthews; Franklin Delano Roosevelt Jr. Henry Knox Sherrill; Boris Shishkin; Dorothy Rogers Tilly; Channing Heggie Tobias

Jurisdiction
- Purpose: Investigate the status of civil rights in the country and propose measures to strengthen and protect them
- Policy areas: Civil rights

Summary
- Establish a permanent Civil Rights Commission, Joint Congressional Committee on Civil Rights, and a Civil Rights Division in the Department of Justice; Develop federal protection from lynching; Establish a permanent fair employment practice commission; Abolish poll taxes; Other measures

The President's Committee on Civil Rights was a United States presidential commission established by President Harry Truman in 1946. The committee was created by Executive Order 9808 on December 5, 1946, and instructed to investigate the status of civil rights in the country and propose measures to strengthen and protect them. The committee submitted the report of its findings, entitled To Secure These Rights, to President Truman in December 1947, and Truman proposed comprehensive civil rights legislation to Congress, and ordered antidiscrimination and desegregation throughout the government and armed forces.

The committee included business, labor, and religious leaders, in addition to scholars.

== History ==
The committee was charged with examining the condition of civil rights in the United States, producing a written report of their findings, and submitting recommendations on improving civil rights in the United States. In December 1947, the committee produced a 178-page report entitled To Secure These Rights: The Report of the President’s Committee on Civil Rights. In the report, it proposed to establish a permanent Civil Rights Commission, Joint Congressional Committee on Civil Rights, and a Civil Rights Division in the Department of Justice; to develop federal protection from lynching; a permanent fair employment practice commission; to abolish poll taxes; and urged other measures. Furthermore, the report raised the distinct possibility that the UN Charter from 1945 could also be used as a source of law to fight persistent racial discrimination in the US.

On July 26, 1948, President Truman advanced the recommendations of the report by signing Executive Order 9980 and Executive Order 9981. Executive Order 9980 ordered the desegregation of the federal work force and Executive Order 9981 ordered the desegregation of the armed services. He also sent a special message to Congress on February 2, 1948, to implement the recommendations of the President's Committee on Civil Rights.

The President's Committee on Civil Rights report also paved way for African-American diplomats to break into previously white-dominated positions. Under President Truman, Edward R. Dudley would become the first African American given an ambassadorship, in part due to the findings of race-relations from the committee. However, these moves were largely done due to a harming of foreign relations due to the United States' race problem. Even with the committee's findings, President Truman had trouble acting on his own research, due to domestic backlash.

== Membership ==
The committee was composed of 15 members:

- Charles Edward Wilson (Chairman)
- Sadie T. Alexander
- James B. Carey
- John Sloan Dickey
- Morris Ernst
- Roland B. Gittelsohn
- Frank Porter Graham
- Francis J. Haas
- Charles Luckman
- Francis P. Matthews
- Franklin Delano Roosevelt Jr.
- Henry Knox Sherrill
- Boris Shishkin
- Dorothy Rogers Tilly
- Channing Heggie Tobias

== Publication ==
- President's Committee on Civil Rights. To Secure These Rights: The Report of the President's Committee on Civil Rights. Washington: GPO, 1947.

== See also ==
- Executive Order 8802, signed by President Franklin D. Roosevelt on July 25, 1941, to prohibit ethnic or racial discrimination in the nation's defense industry
- National Emergency Committee Against Mob Violence
