= National Emergency Committee Against Mob Violence =

The National Emergency Committee Against Mob Violence (NECAMV) was an umbrella organization of civil rights advocates, religious leaders, and labor activists created in 1946 in response to a spate of racially motivated attacks against African-Americans in the summer of that year. NECAMV included representatives from the NAACP, the Urban League, the Federal Council of Churches, and the American Federation of Labor, among others. Prominent individuals such as former First Lady Eleanor Roosevelt also were members. The group was formed in order to lobby President Harry S Truman to take steps to more fully enforce the rights of African-Americans. Led by Walter Francis White, The NECAMV met with Truman on September 19, 1946, and, after relating to him in graphic detail the circumstances of the attacks, Truman insisted that something needed to be done to address the problem. He pledged to issue an executive order establishing a blue ribbon panel that would be charged with investigating the situation and proposing ways of reducing racial tensions and providing for more rigorous enforcement of civil rights.

Truman made good on his pledge in December 1946, when he established the President's Committee on Civil Rights (PCCR). The following year, the PCCR issued its landmark report, To Secure These Rights, which established a blueprint for expanding the protections for civil rights, especially at the federal level.

== Bibliography ==
Lawson, Steven F. To Secure These Rights: The Report of Harry S Truman's Committee on Civil Rights. Boston: Bedford/St. Martins (2004).
