= ARSA =

ARSA or Arsa may refer to:

== People ==
- Arsa Ahmad (born 2003), Indonesian footballer
- Arsa Sarasin (born 1937), Thai diplomat
- Arsenije Milošević (1931–2006), Yugoslav Serbian film and television director

== Other uses ==
- Arylsulfatase A, encoded by the gene ARSA
- All-Russian Scout Association
- Arakan Rohingya Salvation Army, an insurgent group in Rakhine State, Myanmar (Burma)
- Arsa River, in Romania
- Automated radioxenon sampler analyzer
- Arsa, a settlement in Albești, Constanța, Romania
- Associate of the Royal Scottish Academy

== See also ==
- Arsha (community development block) in India
