= Jewish Ledger =

Jewish newspaper based in Connecticut

- Type: Weekly newspaper
- Owner: Henry Zachs
- Founder(s): Samuel Neusner and Rabbi Abraham J. Feldman
- Publisher: 20/20 Media
- Editor: Judie Jacobson
- Founded: April 1929
- Headquarters: West Hartford, Connecticut
- Circulation: 15,000
- ISSN: 2470-4601
- OCLC number: 37017172
- Website: jewishledger.com

The Southern New England Jewish Ledger (formerly the Connecticut Jewish Ledger) is Connecticut's only weekly Jewish newspaper. The Hartford newspaper also has a monthly edition serving the Greater Hartford and western Massachusetts area.

== History ==
It was founded in April 1929 by Samuel Neusner (who had come to the United States from Poland at the age of 10, in 1906) and Rabbi Abraham J. Feldman. Berthold Gaster, whose father had survived the Dachau and Buchenwald concentration camps, became the newspaper's managing editor in 1958. Lee Neusner was publisher from 1960 to 1966, when she sold it to Gaster and Shirley Bunis. In 1992, the paper was sold to NRG Connecticut Limited Partnership.

As of 2015, the editor was Judie Jacobson. Jonathan S. Tobin, currently of The Jewish Exponent of Philadelphia, is a former editor of the Jewish Ledger. In 2022 the Connecticut Ledger and its sister publication, the Massachusetts Jewish Ledger, combined under a newly formed media company, 20/20 Media, as the Southern New England Jewish Ledger.
