= International Noble Gas Experiment =

The International Noble Gas Experiment (INGE) was formed in 1999 as an informal expert's group of developers of radioactive xenon measurement systems for the International Monitoring System for the Comprehensive Nuclear-Test-Ban Treaty (CTBT) (signed in 1997, but which has not entered into force). The group originally consisted of research and development groups from Germany, France, Russia, Sweden, and the United States, as well as personnel from Provisional Technical Secretariat of the Preparatory Commission for the Comprehensive Nuclear-Test-Ban Treaty Organization CTBTO.

The INGE group was formed to test aspects of measuring xenon fission product radionuclides released by nuclear explosions. The systems developed and participating in the INGE measure xenon isotopes in the atmosphere and includes ^{131m}Xe, ^{133}Xe, ^{133m}Xe, and ^{135}Xe.

Since the INGE was formed in 1999, the group has expanded somewhat and now includes R&D and operational groups from many locations around the world. Although there is no official list of INGE members, the group is informally composed of scientists, engineers, and others from Argentina, Austria, Australia, Canada, China, France, Germany, Japan, Norway, South Korea, Sweden, Russia, the United States, and several other countries. These members regularly contribute to better understanding radioactive xenon measurements through operation of samplers, measurements of background at various locations, creation of data analysis routines, etc.

Staff from the preparatory commission of the CTBTO oversaw the experiment, with technical assistance from a German group of noble gas experts from the BfS in Freiburg, Germany. As of 2009, the experiment was still on-going, and so far it had consisted of 3 phases:

== INGE Phase 1 ==
The first phase of the INGE experiment took place in the laboratories. Four systems were developed to the point that they could measure xenon concentrations to specifications laid out by the CTBTO Preparatory Commission.

== INGE Phase 2 ==
The second phase of the INGE experiment took place in Freiburg, Germany, a location far away from the developers laboratories.

Country	Institute	Role	System Name
Germany	(IAR) BfS	System Tester	N/A
France	CEA/DASE	System Developer	SPALAX
Russia	KRI	System Developer	ARIX
Sweden	FOA (FOI)	System Developer	SAUNA
United States	DOE/PNNL	System Developer	ARSA

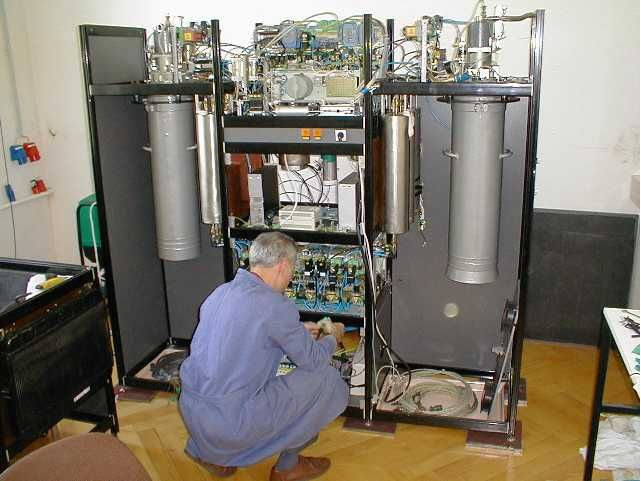
The Analyzer of Xenon Radioisotopes (ARIX)

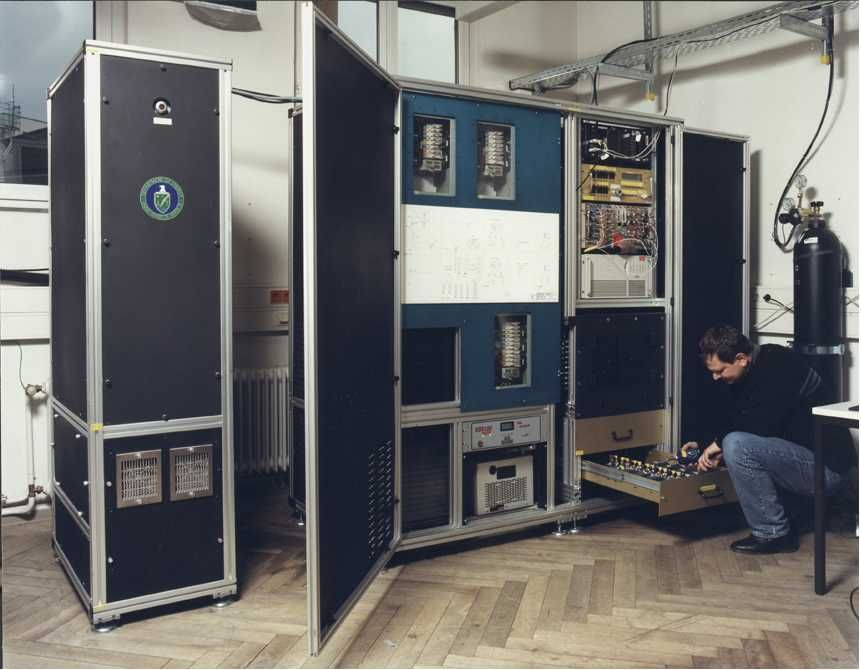
The Automated Radioxenon Sampler Analyzer (ARSA)

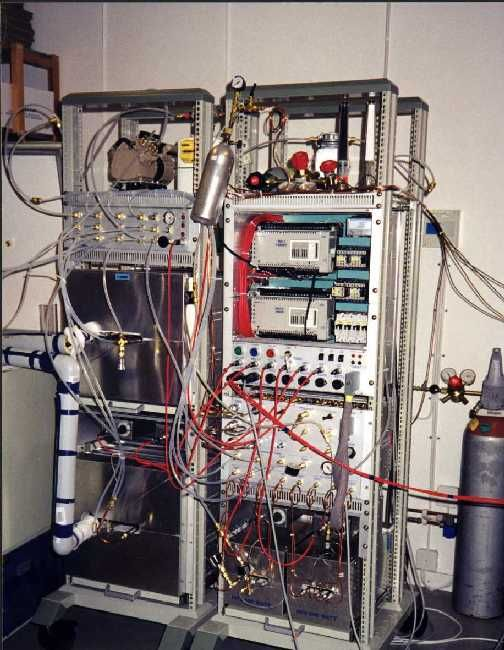
The Swedish Unattended Noble gas Analyzer (SAUNA)

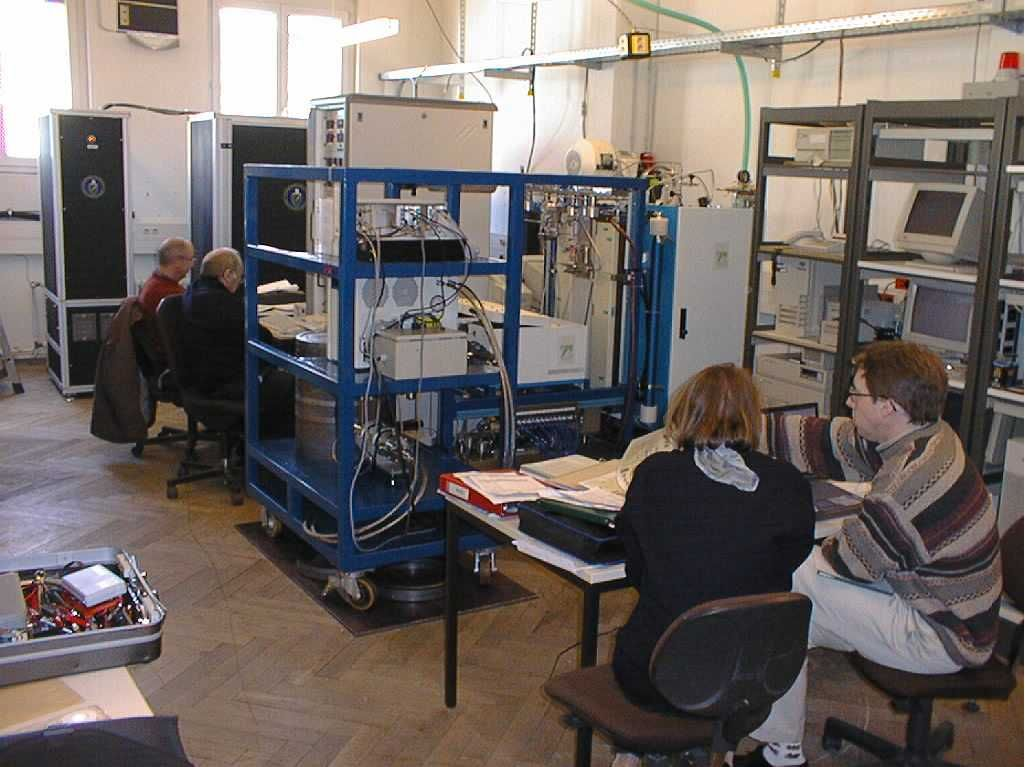
The Systéme de Prélèvements et d’Analyse en Ligne. d’Air pour quantifier le Xénon (SPALAX)

Phase 2: Use of Radioxenon Monitoring Equipment in Freiburg

The four measurement systems tested in Phase 2 had favorable results in that all of the systems met CTBTO minimum specifications and agreed with the independent analyses provided by BfS.

== INGE Phase 3 ==
Phase 3, which was separated into a, b, and c components was designed primarily to test commercial versions of the systems designed and tested in INGE Phase 2. The commercial version of the SAUNA (the SAUNA-II) is now being manufactured by Gammadata, Inc. and the SPALAX is being produced commercially by Environnement S.A, Radionuclides Division (formerly Societé Française d’Ingenierie: SFI).

One of the major aspects of the INGE that has been investigated is the variation of worldwide radioactive xenon backgrounds. Concentrations of the xenon isotopes are continuously measured throughout the INGE experiment, and it has been found so far that a major source of background is medical isotope production.

There has been a number of workshops to discuss various aspects of the experiment and to discuss worldwide backgrounds of radioxenon.

1999 - Freiburg, Germany
1999 - Freiburg, Germany
2000 - Freiburg, Germany
2000 - Freiburg, Germany
2001 - Stockholm, Sweden
2002 - Tahiti, French Polynesia
2002 - Richland, Washington, United States
2003 - Ottawa, Canada
2004 - Strassoldo, Italy
2005 - Stockholm, Sweden
2006 - Melbourne, Australia
2007 - Las Vegas, Nevada, United States
2008 - St. Petersburg, Russian Federation
2009 - Daejeon, South Korea
2010 - Buenos Aires, Argentina
2011 - Yogyakarta, Indonesia
2012 - Mito, Japan
2013 - Vienna, Austria
2015 - Austin, Texas, United States
2017 - London, United Kingdom
2019 - Freiburg, Germany
