= Dorothy Rogers Tilly =

Dorothy Eugenia Rogers Tilly (June 30, 1883 – March 16, 1970) was an American civil rights activist from the Progressive Era until her death. She was a noted activist in the Women's Missionary Society (WMS), Commission on Interracial Cooperation (CIC), Association of Southern Women for the Prevention of Lynching, Southern Regional Council, Fulton-DeKalb Commission on Interracial Cooperation, and Fellowship of the Concerned (FOC). She was also appointed to the President's Committee on Civil Rights in 1946 by Harry S. Truman.

Tilly was a member of Phi Mu fraternity and also an honorary member of Delta Sigma Theta.

== Bibliography ==
- Feldman, Glenn. "'City Mothers' Dorothy Tilly, Georgia Methodist Women, and Black Civil Rights". Politics and Religion in the White South. University Press of Kentucky, 2005. ISBN 978-0-8131-2363-9.
- Houck, Davis W. and David E. Dixon. "Dorothy Tilly". Women and the Civil Rights Movement, 1954-1965. Univ. Press of Mississippi, 2009. ISBN 1-604-73107-9.
- Riehm, Edith Holbrook. "Dorothy Tilly and the Fellowship of the Concerned". Throwing Off the Cloak of Privilege: White Southern Women Activists in the Civil Rights Era. Ed. Gail S. Murray. Gainesville: University Press of Florida, 2004. ISBN 0-813-02726-8.
- Stuart A. Rose Manuscript, Archives, and Rare Book Library, Emory University: Dorothy Rogers Tilly papers, 1868-1970
