= Anna Kharadze =

Soviet botanist (1905–1971)

Anna Kharadze (Georg.: ანა ხარაძე; 1905 — 1971) was a Soviet Georgian biologist, systematist, florist, botanist-geographer, collector, a specialist in the flora of Georgia and the Caucasus as a whole.

== Early life and education ==
Anna Kharadze was born in the city of Elizavetpole (now Ganja, Azerbaijan Republic) in the family of a school teacher of natural sciences. She received her secondary education at a technical school in Tbilisi and then entered the biological department of the natural faculty of Tbilisi State University, from which she graduated in 1927.

== Career ==
After graduating from the university, Kharadze became a senior preparer in the Botanical Cabinet of the Museum of Georgia, an authoritative senior scientific center of the Caucasus region. From 1927 to 1931, she worked there under the guidance of famous botanists Boris Shishkin and Elizaveta Kykodze.

At the same time, Kharadze begins teaching activities as an assistant and then as an associate professor at Tbilisi State University, where she worked until the last days of her life.

During her work at the Museum of Georgia, Kharadze actively participated in all floristic and complex expeditions organized by the Museum and the Georgian Geographical Society in Svaneti, Pshav-Khevsureti, and Khevi to study the nature of high-mountain Georgia. In the same years, being a member of the Club of Georgian Mountaineers, Kharadze became one of the first women to participate in the mountaineering expeditions of Georgian mountaineers, the founders of Soviet mountaineering. In particular, she climbed the peak of Tetnuldi with them in 1933.

In 1934, Kharadze joined the position of a junior researcher in the Department of Systematics and Geography of Plants of the Tbilisi Institute of Botany of the Georgian branch of the Academy of Sciences of the USSR, where she worked under the guidance of well-known experts on the flora and vegetation of the Caucasus - academician of the Academy of Sciences of the USSR Dmitry Sosnovsky and corresponding member of the Academy of Sciences of the USSR Nikolay Bush.

In 1935, Kharadze was approved as a senior researcher at the Institute of Botany of the Georgian SSR. In 1952, she was appointed head of the Department of Systematics and Geography of Plants of the Institute of Botany of the Academy of Sciences of the USSR, where she remained until the end of her life.

In 1938, Kharadze defended her candidate's thesis on the results of a monographic treatment of the difficulty in systematic relation to the Minuartia imbricata (M.Bieb.) Woronov cycle.

== Scientific activities ==
Kharadze's scientific interests included many topics. From the point of view of taxonomy, she treated the most difficult genera from different families of flower plants. Many of her works concern the classification of endemics, and the origin of xerophile and psychrophile vegetation.

Kharadze is the author of valuable work on the systematics of the genus Campanula, summarizing studies To the study of xerophilic flora of the Rocky Mountains (1948), The endemic hemixerophilic element of the highlands of the Greater Caucasus (1960) and To the botanical and geographical zoning of the highlands of the Greater Caucasus (1966).

The standard author abbreviation Kharadze is used to indicate this person as the author when citing a botanical name.

== Public life ==
Kharadze was elected a deputy of the Supreme Soviet of the Georgian SSR of the 3rd convocation (1951-1954) and was a founding member of the Georgian Botanical Society, as well as a member of the editorial board of his journal "Herald".

For several years Kharadze was a member of the Scientific Council, the All-Union Botanical Society (since 1952), a member of the All-Union Coordination Commission of the USSR Academy of Sciences, and a member of the Georgian Geographical Society.

During her stay at the Institute of Botany, Kharadze was a member of the Academic Council and, in the following years, a member of the Specialized Scientific Council of the Academy of Sciences of the Institute of Botany of the Academy of Sciences of the USSR.

== Awards and honors ==
- Order of the Red Banner of Labor
- Medal "For Valorous Work"
- Diploma of Honor of the Presidium of the Supreme Soviet of the Georgian SSR
- Small Silver medal of the All-Union Agricultural Exhibition for participation in the agricultural exhibition

== Plants named after Kharadze ==
- Campanulaceae - gen Annaea KOLAK., 1979 basionym [Campanula subgen. Annaea (Kolak.) Ogan. 1995] [Campanula sect. Annaea (Kolak.) Victorov, 2002]
- Campanulaceae - trib. Annaea KOLAK., 1987
- Annaea hieracioides (KOLAK.) KOLAK., 1979
- Allium charadzeae TSCHOLOKASCHILI
- Astragalus charadzeae GROSSH.
- Campanula annae KOLAK.
- Campanula charadzeae GROSSH.
- Cepchalaria charadzeae SCHCHIAN
- Coronilla charadzeae CHINTH. et TSCHUCHR.
- Delphinium charadzeae KEM.-NATH et GAGNIDZE
- Gagea charadzeae DAVLIFNIDZE
- Jurinea annae SOSN.
- Psephellus annae GALUSCHKO
- Rubus charadzeae K.SANADZE
- Saxifraga charadzeae OTSCHIAURI
- Scorzonera charadzeae V.PAPAVA
- Scorphularia charadzeae KEM.-NATH.
- Sempervivum charadzeae M.CURGENIDZE
- Tragpogon charadzeae KUTHATH.
- Veronica charadzeae KEM.-NATH.
