= Ammiel Hirsch =

American Reform rabbi (born 1959)

Rabbi Ammiel Hirsch

Personal life
- Born: Ammiel Hirsch; January 26, 1959 (age 67)
- Parent(s): Rabbi Richard G. and Bella Hirsch
- Education: London School of Economics and Political Science

Religious life
- Religion: Judaism
- Denomination: Reform Judaism

Jewish leader
- Position: Senior Rabbi
- Synagogue: Stephen Wise Free Synagogue
- Other: Former Executive Director, Association of Reform Zionists of America/World Union for Progressive Judaism, North America
- Residence: New York City
- Semikhah: Hebrew Union College-Jewish Institute of Religion

Ammiel Hirsch (Hebrew: עמיאל הירש, also spelled Amiel Hirsch) (born January 26, 1959) is an American Reform rabbi and attorney. He is the senior rabbi of the Stephen Wise Free Synagogue in Manhattan, and former executive director of the Association of Reform Zionists of America/World Union for Progressive Judaism, North America.

In 2024, The Jerusalem Post named him among “The 50 Most Influential Jews of the Year.” He has written two books: The Lilac Tree: A Rabbi's Reflections on Love, Courage, and History (2023) and One People, Two Worlds: A Reform Rabbi and an Orthodox Rabbi Explore the Issues That Divide Them (2003), which he co-authored with Rabbi Yaakov Yosef Reinman.

== Early life and education ==
Hirsch was born in the United States to Rabbi Richard G. Hirsch (born 1926), a Reform rabbi who founded the movement's Religious Action Center in Washington, D.C., and Executive Director Emeritus of the World Union for Progressive Judaism. His mother is Bella Hirsch; he has two brothers and a sister, Ora Pescovitz.

Hirsch spent his high school years in Israel and served in the IDF as a tank commander. He speaks fluent Hebrew. He went on to earn an LL.B. Honors from the London School of Economics and Political Science and was admitted to the New York State Bar in 1985. He received rabbinical ordination from Hebrew Union College-Jewish Institute of Religion, New York, in 1989.

== Reform leadership ==
From 1992–2004, Hirsch served as executive director of the Association of Reform Zionists of America (ARZA), the Israeli arm of the North American Reform movement. An ardent Zionist, he guided ARZA to accept a new platform embracing Zionism in 1997. He was also a leader in the struggle against Israel's Orthodox religious establishment—which he called "the monopoly"—to recognize the Reform movement in Israel, and was influential in the successful lobbying effort to change Israel's Law of Return to recognize conversions performed by non-Orthodox rabbis in Israel.

In 2004, he joined Stephen Wise Free Synagogue as Senior Rabbi.

Hirsch is also president of the New York Board of Rabbis and a member of Partnership of Faith — an interfaith body of New York religious leaders, the board of commissioners for New York City Mayor Eric Adams' Office to Combat Antisemitism, and New York State Attorney General Letitia James' Black-Jewish Clergy Roundtable.

Additionally, Hirsch hosts a podcast, titled In These Times with Rabbi Ammi Hirsch. In this podcast, Rabbi Hirsch meets with prominent Jewish, New Yorker, or International figures, and discusses current topics relating to politics and Judaism with the guests. A new episode releases once every 1-3 weeks.

In his sermon delivered on Yom Kippur in September 2026, Hirsch warned that "Unhinged and obsessive loathing of Israel is corrupting American values" and that hatred of Jews harms America itself. Hirsch encouraged American Jews to "stay and fight" by engaging in social and political advocacy and responding to hate that exists on all sides of the political divide.

Hirsch criticized a statement issued by New York City mayor Zohran Mamdani on October 7, 2026, the third anniversary of the October 7 attacks in Israel. Much of Mamdani's statement focused on the suffering of Palestinians in Gaza, and was perceived by some as downplaying Jewish grief. In his statement, Mandani described the "horrific war crimes" committed by Hamas as "profoundly painful for so many New Yorkers". He then denounced the ongoing genocide in Gaza, writing "The suffering did not begin nor end that day. That suffering has intensified with every Israeli bomb dropped on ambulances waiting outside hospitals, every drone strike targeting a residential building or journalist, and every shipment of food aid turned away at a border crossing" and ended with "To honor the dead, we must fight for a world in which every person can live with freedom, safety, and dignity." Hirsch described Mamdani's remarks as "morally perverse" and "so offensive to so many Jews that it is hard to describe how offensive it is" and said that the statement was like "sticking a knife into the pain of the Jewish community".

== One People, Two Worlds ==
In 2000, a literary agent introduced Hirsch to Yaakov Yosef Reinman, an Orthodox rabbi and Talmudic scholar, and presented the two with the idea of collaborating on a book airing the Reform and Orthodox viewpoints on various issues. Their email correspondence over the next 18 months resulted in the book One People, Two Worlds: A Reform Rabbi and an Orthodox Rabbi Explore the Issues That Divide Them, first published in 2002.

The book was hailed by the religious left as a breakthrough in Orthodox recognition of religious pluralism, but generated criticism in Orthodox circles regarding Rabbi Reinman's willingness to conduct official rabbinic dialogue with a Reform clergyman. The book was denounced by the Moetzes Gedolei HaTorah, the rabbinical council of Agudath Israel of America, and by the heads of Beth Medrash Govoha in Lakewood, New Jersey, where Reinman had received his rabbinic ordination. Reinman subsequently pulled out of a 14-city promotional tour after two appearances, leaving Hirsch to continue the tour on his own.

== Honors ==
In 2024, the Jerusalem Post named Hirsch to its "50 Most Influential Jews" list alongside fellow rabbis Hirschy Zarchi, Ephraim Mirvis, and Yuda Drizin for "[offering] the people of Israel and Jews across the globe guidance and support" throughout the ongoing Gaza war.

== Bibliography ==
- Hirsch, Ammiel (1989). From Moses to Marx: Russian Zionism as portrayed through the Hebrew press of 1917. Hebrew Union College-Jewish Institute of Religion.
- Hirsch, Ammiel; Reinman, Yaakov Yosef (2003). One People, Two Worlds: A Reform rabbi and an Orthodox rabbi explore the issues that divide them. Schocken Books. ISBN 0-8052-1140-3.
- Hirsch, Ammiel (2023). The Lilac Tree: A Rabbi's Reflections on Love, Courage, and History. Wicked Son. ISBN 978-1-6375-8746-1.
