= Tyczyn =

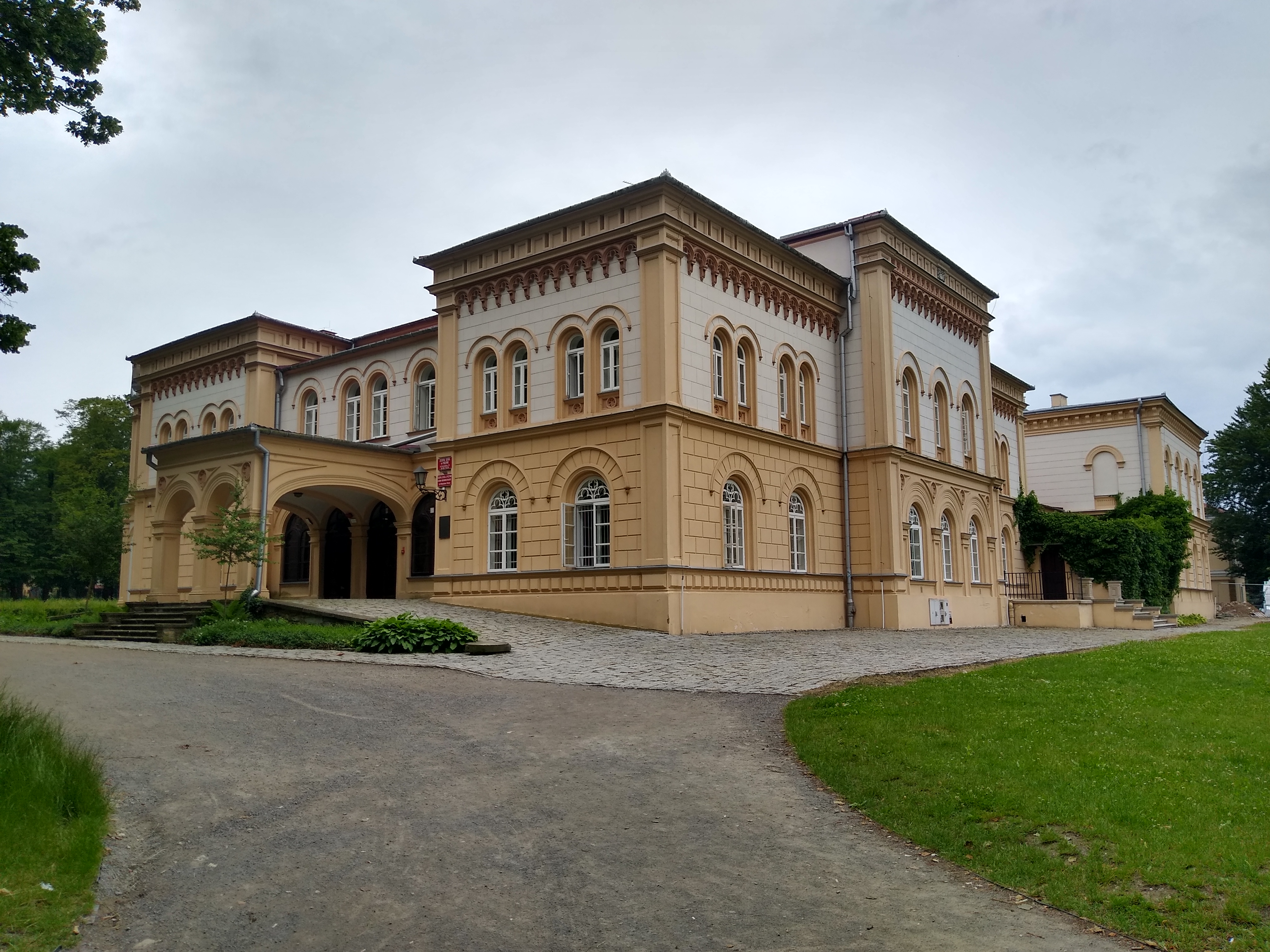
- Wodzicki Palace

- Flag Coat of arms

- Location within Poland
- Coordinates: 49°58′N 22°2′E
- Country: Poland
- Voivodeship: Subcarpathian
- County: Rzeszów
- Gmina: Tyczyn
- Established: 1368
- Town rights: 1368

Government
  - Mayor: Janusz Błotnicki

Area
  - Total: 9.67 km^{2} (3.73 sq mi)

Population (2006)
  - Total: 3,299
  - Density: 341/km^{2} (884/sq mi)
- Time zone: UTC+1 (CET)
  - Summer (DST): UTC+2 (CEST)
- Postal code: 36-020
- Area code: +48 17
- Vehicle registration: RZE
- Website: http://www.tyczyn.pl

Tyczyn [ˈtɨt͡ʂɨn] is a town in southern Poland with a population of 3,353 inhabitants (02.06.2009). It is located in the Rzeszów County of the Subcarpathian Voivodeship. It is a suburb of the regional capital Rzeszów.

== Geography ==
Tyczyn is located in the lower Carpathian foothills, about halfway between the cities of Kraków to the west and Lviv (Lwów) to the east. The center of town is on top of a hill surrounded by numerous farming villages. To the north of town is the Strug River.

== History ==
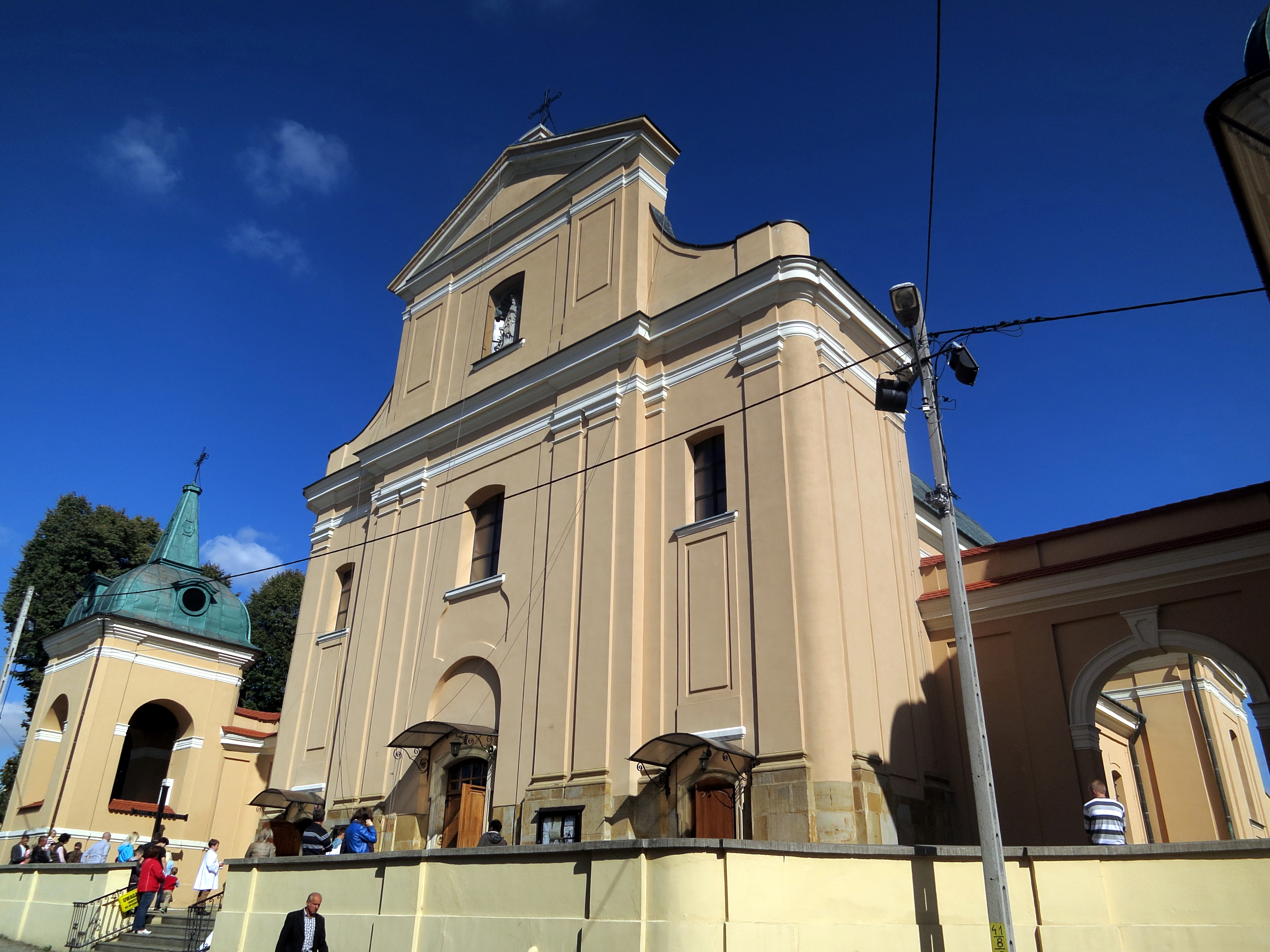
Baroque Church of the Assumption and Saint Catherine

In 1368, King Casimir III of Poland granted Bartold Tyczner, a merchant from Moravia, a part of the former royal forest to establish a town. Possibly in the late 14th century, it became a private town of the Pilecki family. The Jews migrated into the area during the 15th and 16th centuries.

The town grew and dominated the area until the mid-17th century when it was destroyed first by a Tatar and later by a Cossack invasion. Following the Partitions of Poland, during the years 1792 to 1918 Tyczyn was part of the Austrian Partition of Poland. During those years the area of Tyczyn came under administrative control of Rzeszów, a larger town and a county seat, some eight miles (13 kilometres) north of Tyczyn. Weekly markets and eleven annual fairs were held in Tyczyn in the late 19th century.

Prior to World War II, Tyczyn had a vibrant Jewish shtetl community. During the German invasion of Poland, which started World War II, Tyczyn was captured by the Germans on September 10, 1939. The Jewish residents faced severe restrictions, relocation from their homes to the Rzeszów ghetto, deportations to forced labour and concentration camps, as well as numerous executions. In particular, there is a large mass grave for the Jewish inhabitants who were executed in the forests in the outskirts of the town. George Lucius Salton, a former resident of Tyczyn, estimates that the Nazis reduced Jewish population from approximately 2,000 people to 10 people by end of the war. According to Salton's autobiography, most of the ghetto's population, promised relocation to a large Ukrainian farm, were taken directly to Belzec where they were gassed in the designated gas chambers. On October 15, 1943, the Gestapo carried out a massacre of five Poles, including one woman, as punishment for aiding Jews. Today, sites within the town serve as memorials and learning centers for the Tyczyn's victims of the Holocaust.

== Education ==
- Wyższa Szkoła Społeczno-Gospodarcza (Social-Economic High School)

== Notable people ==
- Eliezer Schindler, Jewish poet and activist.
