= Roland B. Gittelsohn =

American rabbi and author

Roland B. Gittelsohn (May 13, 1910 – December 13, 1995) was an American rabbi and author. He served as founding rabbi of Central Synagogue in Rockville Center, New York from 1936-1953. He was the first Jewish chaplain assigned to the United States Marine Corps, serving in the U. S. Navy during World War II. In 1945, he delivered a eulogy after the Battle of Iwo Jima dedicating the 5th Marine Division's cemetery. Its text was republished widely. (The division held separate Protestant, Catholic, and Jewish dedication ceremonies.) Gittelsohn was Senior Rabbi of Temple Israel in Boston from 1953-1977.

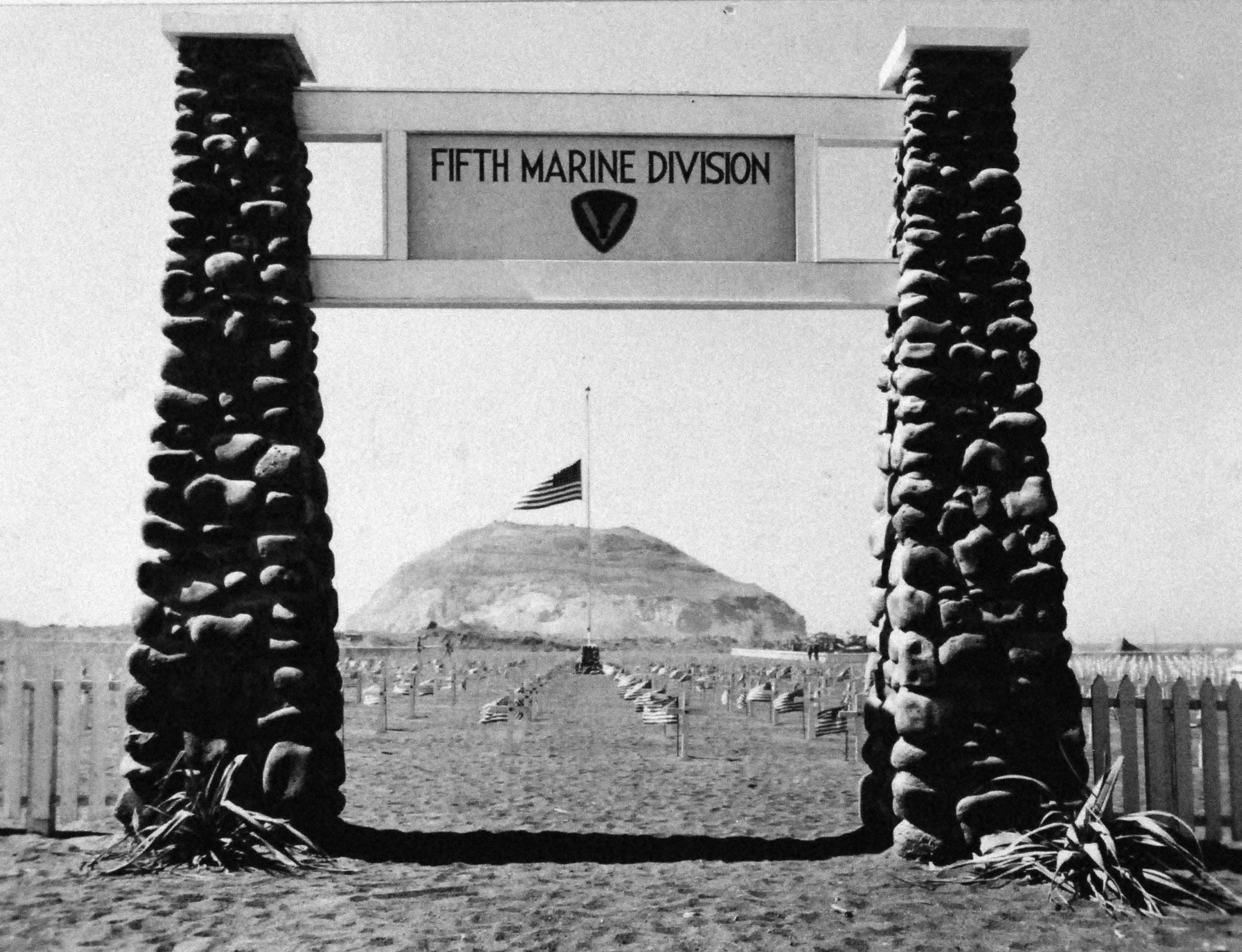
The 5th Division cemetery (later moved to Hawaii) at Iwo Jima, with Mt Suribachi

After the war, Gittelsohn served on the President's Committee on Civil Rights in Harry Truman's administration. He later served as president of the Central Conference of American Rabbis.

== Early life ==
Gittelsohn was born on 13 May 1910 in Cleveland, Ohio. Graduating Phi Beta Kappa, he received a bachelor of arts degree in 1931 from Western Reserve University in Cleveland and a bachelor of Hebrew letters from Hebrew Union College in Cincinnati in 1934. He was ordained at Hebrew Union College in 1936. He also studied at the Teachers’ College, Columbia University and New School in New York.

== Rabbinate ==
He was president of the Massachusetts Board of Rabbis from 1958 to 1960; president of the Central Conference of American Rabbis from 1969 to 1971, and president of the Association of Reform Zionists of America from 1977 to 1984.

== Personal life ==
Gittelsohn died in 1995 at the age of 85 at Beth Israel Hospital in Boston. He had two children, David and Judith, with Ruth Freyer, whom he married in 1932. The couple were married until Ruth's death in 1970. In 1978, Gittelsohn married Hulda, who died in 2017.

== Publications ==
- Modern Jewish Problems, A Textbook for High School Classes and Jewish Youth Groups (Union of American Hebrew Congregations, 1941)
- Little Lower Than The Angels (Union of American Hebrew Congregations, 1955)
- Consecrated unto me: A Jewish View of Love and Marriage (Union of American Hebrew Congregations, 1965)
- My Beloved Is Mine: Judaism and Marriage (Union of American Hebrew Congregations, 1969)
- Wings of the Morning (Union of American Hebrew Congregations, 1969)
- The Modern Meaning of Judaism (Collins, 1970) ISBN 978-0-5290-5640-5
- The Extra Dimension: a Jewish View of Marriage (Union of American Hebrew Congregations, 1983) ISBN 978-0-8074-0170-5
- Here Am I- Harnessed to Hope (Vantage Press, 1988) ISBN 978-0-5330-7601-7
- How Do I Decide? A Contemporary Jewish Approach to What's Right and What's Wrong (Behrman House, 1989) ISBN 978-0-8744-1488-2
- Pacifist to Padre: The World War II Memoir of Chaplain Roland B. Gittelsohn, December 1941-January 1946 (Marine Corps University Press, 2021) ISBN 978-1-7320031-5-6
