= Boris Shishkin =

AFL-CIO official

- Born: 1908; Odessa, Russian Empire
- Died: 1984 age 77; Washington, DC
- Education: Columbia University (BA)
- Known for: AFL–CIO Department of Civil Rights

Boris Basil Shishkin (October 28, 1906 – June 12, 1984) served many different roles in his 38 years at American Federation of Labor, including as the head of the AFL–CIO Department of Civil Rights following the merger of the American Federation of Labor and Congress of Industrial Organizations in 1955.

== Biography ==
Shishkin was born in Odessa, Russian Empire. In 1919, his family relocated to Turkey before the family immigrated to the United States.

Living in New York City, New York, Shishkin worked a truck driver for the American News Company. He began school at Columbia University in 1927, and he graduated with a Bachelor of Arts in economics in 1930 and his master's degree in 1931. Shishkin moved to Washington D.C. for a fellowship at the Brookings Institution in 1932.

In 1933, Shishkin joined the AFL as a researcher of economic data. He also drafted articles and speeches for William Green, president of the AFL. From 1939 until 1955, Shishkin was the secretary of the AFL Housing Committee. The AFL and the Congress of Industrial Organizations merged in 1955 to form the AFL–CIO; Shishkin became the secretary of the AFL–CIO Housing Committee.

During his time with the AFL also held several positions, including as secretary on the social security committee (1951–1953), as one of the 15 members of the President's Committee on Civil Rights (1946–1947), as Special Assistant to Marshall Plan head Averell Harriman at the European Headquarters in Paris (1948–1952), and as a board member of the League for Industrial Democracy.

He was the vice president and later chairman of the National Bureau of Economic Research.

Shishkin married Julia L. Kitendaugh on April 24, 1931; they divorced in 1949. Shishkin remarried to Hildegard M. Blanken on October 18, 1955. Shishkin died with Alzheimer's disease at age 77.

== Written works ==
- Shishkin, Boris (September 8, 2016). "Organized Labor and the Veteran:". The ANNALS of the American Academy of Political and Social Science. doi:10.1177/000271624523800120.
- Shishkin, Boris (April 1, 1947). "The Settlement of Contract Negotiation Disputes: A Labor Viewpoint". Law and Contemporary Problems. 12 (2): 357–366. ISSN 0023-9186.
- Shishkin, Boris (April 1, 1944). "Problems Affecting Labor". Law and Contemporary Problems. 10(4): 613–632. ISSN 0023-9186.
