= Reform Judaism (magazine) =

Defunct American magazine

Reform Judaism was the world's largest circulated Jewish magazine

Reform Judaism was the official magazine of the Union for Reform Judaism. The magazine was established in 1972. Its print edition had a quarterly circulation to nearly 300,000 households, synagogues, and other Jewish institutions. The last issue was published in Fall 2014. The magazine was headquartered in New York City.

== Awards and academic recognition ==
From time to time its articles have won awards or been listed in RAMBI, the index of articles on Jewish Studies:

- "Why I Have Not Visited Germany" (Winter 1997) by Rabbi Arthur Hertzberg. The American Jewish Press Association awarded this article a first place Simon Rockower Award for Excellence in Jewish Journal for commentary and editorial writing.
- "Thank You, Moritz Loth: A 125-year UAHC Retrospective" (registration required) (vol. 27, no. 1 (Fall 1998): pp. 30–34, 36–39) by Michael Meyer is listed in RAMBI.
