= Automated radioxenon sampler analyzer =

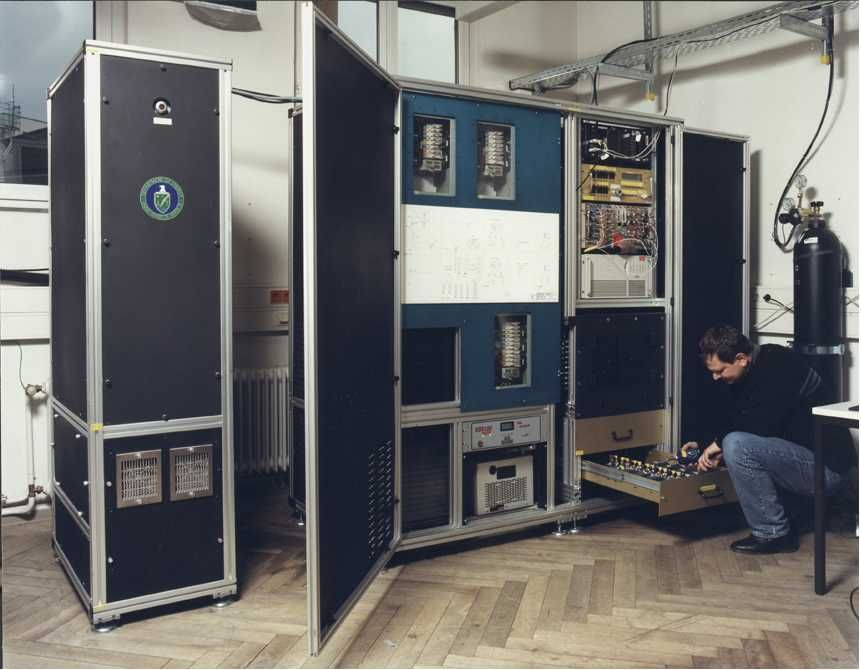
The ARSA system

The automated radioxenon sampler-analyzer (ARSA) was designed by the Pacific Northwest National Laboratory in the late 1990s with funding and support from the U.S. Department of Energy. The ARSA system automatically collects and measures radioxenon from the air.

The ARSA system continuously collects xenon from the air in batch mode, processing approximately 48 m^{3} in an 8-hour period. The average amount of xenon collected in this period is approximately 2 cc. The xenon gas is then transferred into a nuclear detection system consisting of a beta–gamma coincidence spectrometer.

== History ==
The ARSA was designed at PNNL in support of the International Monitoring System of the CTBT.

- 1995 – ARSA concept first proven in the laboratory
- 1997 – ARSA underwent a field test at the Environmental Measurements Laboratory in New York City
- 2000 – The ARSA system was sent to Freiburg, Germany to participate in the International Noble Gas Experiment
- 2000 – The ARSA was adopted by DME corporation for commercialization
- 2002 – The commercialization of the ARSA was transferred to General Dynamics Corporation
- 2003 – The ARSA was sent to Guangzhou, China for further participation in the International Noble Gas Experiment

== Operating principles ==
Detection and measurement of atmospheric radioxenon is an important component of international monitoring systems for nuclear weapons testing. Monitoring stations separate xenon from air and perform isotopic analysis of the radioxenon. In one such radioxenon measurement scheme, the isotopes of interest are identified by coincident spectroscopy of electrons and photons in a β/γ coincidence spectrometer (BGCS). The β spectrometer is a plastic scintillator, manufactured as a cylindrical cell containing the separated xenon sample. This cell is surrounded by the NaI(Tl) γ spectrometer. We report here the development of a calibration process for the BGCS suitable for use in remote sampling systems. This procedure is based upon γ-ray Compton scattering, resulting in a true coincident signal in both detectors, generation of electrons over a wide energy range that matches the energy distribution of electrons from radioxenon decay, and a relative insensitivity to source location. In addition to gain calibration, this procedure determines the resolution of the β detector as a function of energy.
