= Association of Reform Zionists of America =

Zionist organization

- Abbreviation: ARZA
- Theology: Reform Judaism
- President: Rabbi Joshua Weinberg
- Chairman: Rabbi Bennett Miller
- Associations: Union for Reform Judaism American Zionist Movement World Zionist Organization World Zionist Congress
- Region: United States and Canada
- Headquarters: 633 Third Avenue, New York City
- Origin: 1978
- Official website: www.arza.org

The Association of Reform Zionists of America (ARZA) is the Zionist organization of the Reform movement in the United States. It was founded in 1978.

== History ==
ARZA was founded in 1978 after a resolution at the 1977 UAHC 54th General Assembly biennial convention.

ARZA is a member of the American Zionist Movement and, by extension, is part of the World Zionist Organization. In 2015, ARZA sent 56 delegates to the 37th World Zionist Congress after winning 40% of the US vote held by AZM. This was the single largest faction of the US delegation. Between the previous AZM WZC election in 2006 and the 2015 election, ARZA sent 56 delegates to the 2006 35th WZC and to the 2010 36th WZC.

=== Leaders ===
Lay leadership

Current Chairman: Rabbi Bennett Miller (2012-present)

Former Presidents

- Rabbi Roland B. Gittelsohn (1978-1984)
- Rabbi Charles Kroloff (1984-1989)
- Norman Schwartz (1989-1993)
- Marcia Cayne (1993-1995)
- Philip Meltzer (1995-2004)
- Rabbi Stanley Davids (2004-2008)
- Rabbi Robert Orkand (2008-2012)
- Rabbi Bennett Miller (2012-2016, 2018-2021)
- Rabbi John Rosove (2016 - 2018)

Staff leadership

Current President/Executive Director: Rabbi Joshua Weinberg (2013-present)

Former Executive Directors

- Rabbi Ira Youdovin 1977-1983
- Rabbi Eric Yoffie 1983-1992
- Rabbi Ammiel Hirsch 1992-2004
- Rabbi Andrew Davids 2004-2008
- Elana Paru - Interim Executive Director January to July 2009
- Rabbi Scott Sperling August 2009-June 2010
- Rabbi Daniel Allen July 2010-October 2012
- Barbara Kavadias - Interim Acting Executive Director November 2012-August 2013

== See also ==
- Reform Zionism
- Union for Reform Judaism
- World Union for Progressive Judaism
- Religious Action Center
- American Zionist Movement
- World Zionist Organization
- World Zionist Congress
