= Jewish Institute of Religion =

American Jewish seminary (1922–1950)

- Active: 1922–1950
- Location: New York City, New York, United States

The Jewish Institute of Religion was an educational establishment created by Rabbi Stephen S. Wise in 1922 in New York City. While generally incorporating Reform Judaism, it was separate from the previously established Hebrew Union College. It sought to train rabbis "for the Jewish ministry, research, and community service." Students were to serve either Reform or traditional pulpits.

Wise's early support for Zionism, and his dispute with Reform hierarchy over the "question whether the pulpit shall be free or whether the pulpit shall not be free, and, by reason of its loss of freedom, reft of its power for good", led to the establishment of his Free Synagogue in 1907. Wise remained president until 1948, and housed JIR with his Free Synagogue House at 40 West 68th Street. He hoped that its graduates would generate other Free Synagogues "animated by the same spirit of free inquiry, of warm Jewish feeling, and of devotion to the cause of social regeneration." JIR from the start inclined to Zionism, in contrast to HUC, which at the time did not favor Jewish nationalism.

In 1939 Helen Levinthal became the first American woman to complete the entire course of study in a rabbinical school, which she did at JIR. However, she only received a Master of Hebrew Letters (and a certificate recognizing her accomplishment) upon graduation, rather than a Master of Hebrew Letters and ordination as the men received, since the faculty felt it was not yet time for women's ordination as rabbis.

Motivated largely by budgetary difficulties, Wise accepted the prospect of JIR's merger with HUC once the biblical archaeologist Nelson Glueck assumed the presidency. Negotiations were completed in 1948, Rabbi Wise died in 1949 and in 1950 the two schools merged. In 1954 a school in Los Angeles was chartered and, in 1963, primarily as a result of Glueck's efforts, a Jerusalem campus, initially devoted to archaeology, was opened.
