= Stephen Wise Free Synagogue =

Reform synagogue in Manhattan, New York

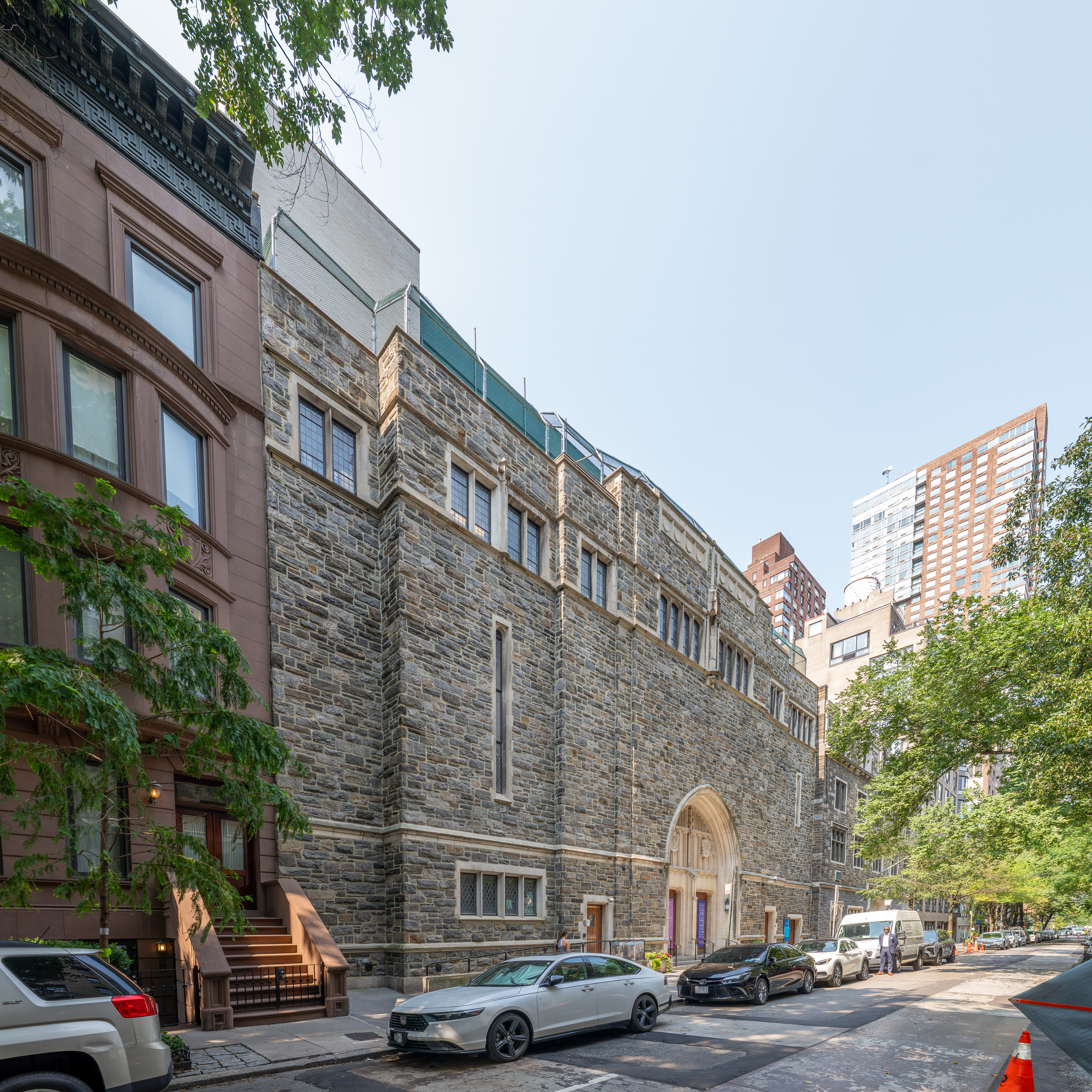
- Seen from W 68th Street (2026)

- Location in Manhattan, New York City

Religion
- Affiliation: Reform Judaism
- Ecclesiastical or organisational status: Synagogue
- Leadership: Rabbi Ammiel Hirsch
- Status: Active

Location
- Location: 30 West 68th Street, Upper West Side, Manhattan, New York City, New York 10023
- Country: United States
- Coordinates: 40°46′26″N 73°58′45″W

Architecture
- Type: Synagogue
- Established: 1907 (as a congregation)
- Groundbreaking: 1940
- Completed: 1949 (dedicated in honor of Rabbi Wise)

Website
- swfs.org

Stephen Wise Free Synagogue is a Reform Jewish synagogue at 30 West 68th Street on the Upper West Side of Manhattan in New York City, New York, U.S. The congregation was the first of multiple "free synagogue" branches in the early 20th century.

== Foundation ==
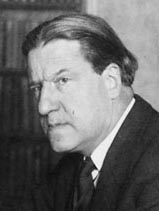
Rabbi Stephen Wise

In 1905, Rabbi Stephen Samuel Wise then serving a congregation in Portland, Oregon, was under consideration as Rabbi of Temple Emanu–El in New York City, but withdrew his name after learning that his sermons would be reviewed in advance by the synagogue's board of trustees. In January 1906, The New York Times published a letter from Rabbi Wise that stated that the demands placed on him raised the "question whether the pulpit shall be free or whether the pulpit shall not be free, and, by reason of its loss of freedom, reft of its power for good." The Times noted that Wise planned to head to New York to "organize and lead an independent Jewish religious movement."

Within months of this letter, Rabbi Wise started work toward a "free synagogue" holding services at the Hudson Theater on West 44th Street and on the Lower East Side. At a meeting on April 15, 1907, Henry Morgenthau Sr. told the more than hundred assembled at the Hotel Savoy that "The Free Synagogue is to be free and democratic in its organization; it is to be pewless and dueless."

In 1910, the congregation's 500 members celebrated Rosh Hashanah at Carnegie Hall, and a number of brownstones were purchased on West 68th Street in 1911 as the site of a permanent home for the synagogue. Branches of the Free Synagogue were started in the Bronx, Washington Heights, Flushing, and Westchester County in New York, and Newark in New Jersey, from 1914 to 1920.

== Notable leaders ==
=== Rabbinic leadership ===
==== Rabbi Stephen Wise ====
Rabbi Wise served as the congregation's religious leader from his founding of the congregation in 1907 as the "Free Synagogue" until his death on April 19, 1949. Wise designated Rabbi Edward E. Klein as his successor. At a meeting of the congregation in May 1949, members voted unanimously to incorporate Rabbi Wise's name into the formal name of the congregation.

==== Rabbi Edward Klein ====
Rabbi Klein served as the compass for the synagogue from 1949 until 1981, and as Rabbi Emeritus until his death in July 1985. His work at SWFS first started while he was in Rabbinical training. After his ordination he was invited to serve as Assistant Rabbi under Stephen Wise. Social activism guided by ethics proved him to be a community minded voice who strongly believed in equality and social inclusion. In 1973 he chose to share his pulpit with the first female Assistant Rabbi in the US, Rabbi Sally Priesand. A portion of his papers (1920–1981) can be found in The Rabbi Edward Klein Memorial Library at Stephen Wise Free Synagogue.

==== Rabbi Sally Priesand ====
Rabbi Sally Priesand, America's first ordained female rabbi, began serving in 1972, the same year she was ordained. Her attention to the congregation extended far beyond her speeches. She was very active in the Hebrew School and paid attention to how she would be shaping a new generation of youth while Assistant, and eventually Associate Rabbi. When Rabbi Klein had a stroke in 1978, she led this house through his return to the pulpit in his wheelchair on September 30, 1978. She left the following year when larger politics prevented her from leading the congregation herself. Rabbi Brickner soon arrived from Washington, DC.

==== Rabbi Balfour Brickner ====
Rabbi Balfour Brickner led the congregation from 1980 to 1992. During his leadership Brickner used the pulpit to speak out against US policies in Central America and with the South African Apartheid regime, and spoke out for the rights of Palestinians. He brought a more participatory service and made himself more accessible to members of the congregation.

==== Rabbi Ammiel Hirsch ====
Rabbi Ammiel Hirsch, former Executive Director of the Association of Reform Zionists of America/World Union for Progressive Judaism, North America, became senior rabbi in 2004.

=== Musical leadership ===
==== Abraham Wolf Binder ====
Abraham Wolf Binder served as Music Director of Stephen Wise Free Synagogue from 1925 until 1966. A composer and leading figure in American Reform Jewish liturgical music, Binder shaped the congregation’s musical life for more than four decades. He composed extensively for synagogue worship and was influential in the development of a distinctly American synagogue music tradition during the twentieth century.

==== Cantor Daniel Singer ====
The current Cantor is Daniel Singer.

== Cemetery ==
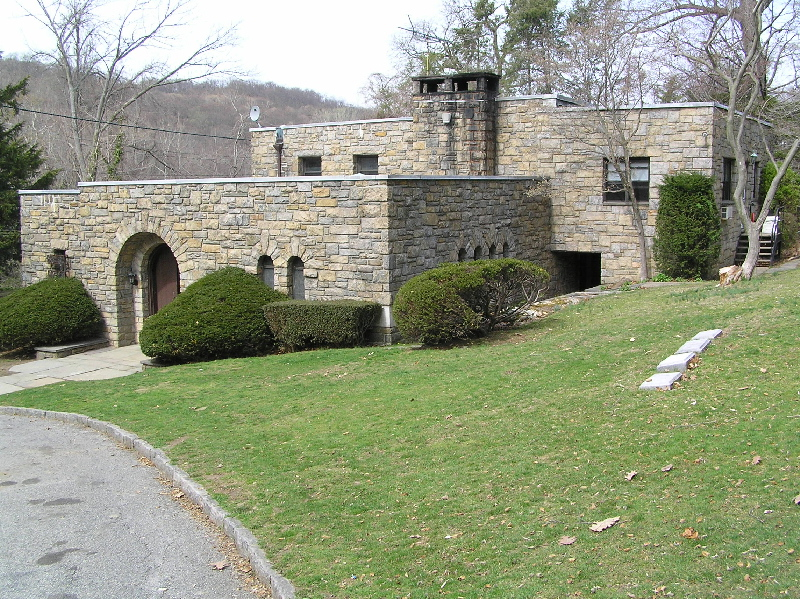
The main office of Westchester Hills Cemetery

The synagogue created the Westchester Hills Cemetery of the Free Synagogue in Hastings-on-Hudson, New York in 1919 when it acquired the northern portion of the non–sectarian Mount Hope Cemetery, which had been created in the 19th century. There are some 1,500 individual grave sites, a Community Mausoleum with 138 crypts, and other mausoleums for individuals and families.

Westchester Hills is the interment site of John Garfield, George Gershwin, Ira Gershwin, Judy Holliday, Billy Rose, Lee Strasberg, David Susskind, Rabbi Stephen S. Wise and of members of the Barricini, Guggenheim, Tisch, and Millstein families.

== See also ==
- Free Synagogue of Flushing, the oldest Reform Jewish congregation in Queens, which was founded as a "free synagogue" branch
