= American Zionist Movement =

Organization

- Formation: 1993
- Type: Human rights, pro-Israel, human relations
- Headquarters: New York, NY, U.S.
- Executive Director: Herbert Block
- Key people: Mark Levenson – President
- Website: azm.org

The American Zionist Movement (AZM) is the American federation of Zionist groups and individuals affiliated with the World Zionist Organization.

Founded in 1993, AZM is the successor organization to the American Zionist Emergency Council (1939), the American Zionist Council (1949), and the American Zionist Federation (1970).

== See also ==
- Hadassah Women's Zionist Organization of America
- Nefesh B'Nefesh
