= Peixotto =

Peixotto is a surname. Notable people with the surname include:

- Becca Peixotto, American archaeologist
- Benjamin F. Peixotto (1834–1890), American lawyer and diplomat
- Bridget Peixotto (1877–1972), American educator, union leader
- Daniel Levy Maduro Peixotto (1800–1843), Dutch-American physician
- Edgar D. Peixotto (1867–1925), American lawyer
- Ernest Peixotto (1869–1940), American artist, illustrator, and writer
- Grace Peixotto (1817–1880), American brothel owner
- Jessica Blanche Peixotto (1864–1941), Jewish-American educator and writer
- Judith Salzedo Peixotto (1823–1881), Jewish-American teacher and principal
- Raphael Peixotto (1837–1905), Jewish-American merchant
