= Benjamin F. Peixotto =

American lawyer and diplomat (1834–1890)

Benjamin F. Peixotto

Benjamin Franklin Peixotto (November 13, 1834 – September 18, 1890) was a Jewish-American lawyer and diplomat.

== Life ==
Peixotto was born on November 13, 1834, in New York City, New York, the son of Dutch immigrant and physician Daniel Levy Maduro Peixotto and Rachel M. Sexias. His siblings included teacher Judith Salzedo Peixotto and merchant Raphael Peixotto.

Peixotto moved to Cleveland, Ohio when he was two after his father accepted a position at Willoughby Medical College. He left with his family in 1841, but he returned to Cleveland when he was thirteen. He entered the retail business with George A. Davis in the 1850s, and in 1855 the two founded the Hebrew Benevolent Society (which Peixotto was secretary of). He became an editorial writer for The Plain Dealer in 1856, although he left the paper in 1862 due to its Copperhead sympathies. In 1860, he founded the Young Men's Hebrew Literary Society, which he convinced to affiliate with B'nai B'rith as the Montefiore Lodge in 1864. In 1863, he helped found the first B'nai B'rith lodge in Cincinnati. When he was twenty-nine, he was elected Grand Saar of the national B'nai B'rith, a position he held for four years. He helped B'nai B'rith District #2 establish the Jewish Orphan Asylum in Cleveland and raised funds for it by pushing a one dollar capitation tax on members and organizing women's groups in nine cities. While living in Cleveland, he was a member of Tifereth-Israel, serving as its treasurer and trustee and establishing and superintending the Sunday school in 1858. He studied law in the office of Stephen A. Douglas and supported Douglas during his 1860 presidential campaign, although he supported the war effort during the American Civil War. He moved to New York City in 1867, and in 1868 he moved to San Francisco, California to practice law.

In 1870, when Romanian Jews were facing persecution and violence that shocked the world, the Jewish-American community pressured the American government to appoint a new American Consul in Bucharest that would pressure Romania to improve conditions for its Jewish community. President Grant appointed Peixotto Consul in July 1870, although he didn't leave America until December and didn't arrive in Bucharest until February 1871. He wasn't officially accredited before Prince Charles until April, when he could get accreditation that fully recognized Romanian independence instead of as part of the Ottoman Empire. He appointed Adolphe Stern, a lawyer who wasn't allowed to practice law, as his secretary. He supported the Westernization and internal improvement of the Jewish community, helping establish the Zion Society (which later became B'nai B'rith in Romania) and the Society for the Culture of the Israelites in Roumania (which established and strengthened schools across Romania). In order to help spread his ideas and fight against an anti-Semitic press that opposed him, he began unofficially sponsoring the semi-weekly German-language paper Roumanische Post in April 1871, which ran for two years and proved costly for his resources. In 1872, following a wave of attacks against Jews and their property, he led official and unofficial protests against the attacks. His efforts were supported by Secretary of State Fish, although the Romanian government opposed him and after he wrote a letter in 1872 that proposed the Jews immigrate to America, they sought to embarrass him by encouraging emigration. This cost him support in America as well as the Romanian and international Jewish communities. He regularly struggled to raise enough funds from the American and international Jewish community. He planned to leave Romania and the Consulship in 1875, with the hope of receiving a higher diplomatic office like the Consul Generalship of Constantinople, although he stayed several more months during the Great Eastern Crisis. He left for good in June 1876, returning to America that July. His efforts to improve conditions for Romanian Jews laid the groundwork for the 1878 Treaty of Berlin.

Peixotto took an active part in the 1876 presidential election, stumping across Ohio for Rutherford B. Hayes with Carl Schurz, James A. Garfield, and James G. Blaine. In 1877, newly elected President Hayes offered to appoint him Consul-General at Saint Petersburg, Russia, which he declined. He instead accepted an appointment as Consul at Lyon, France, serving in that position under the successive administrations of Presidents Hayes, Garfield, and Arthur. As Consul, he wrote reports on various economic topics that attracted attention from the diplomatic and commercial world. He returned to America in 1885 and practiced law in New York City. He also became a trustee of the Hebrew Technical Institute and the New York Sanitary Aid Society, a founder of the Ohio Society, and an active member of several literary and benevolent organizations. He was a founder of the Union of American Hebrew Congregations. In 1886, he founded the Jewish periodical The Menorah, A Monthly Magazine, the only English Jewish monthly to exist at the time. He edited the periodical until his death.

In 1858, Piexotto married Hannah Strauss of Louisville, Kentucky. Their children were artist George D. M., Fannie, M. Percy, Judith, Mabel, Beatrice, Maud, Irving, and Frank.

Peixotto died at home from consumption on September 18, 1890. The funeral took place in Temple Israel of Harlem, with Rabbi Henry Pereira Mendes conducting the service and Maurice H. Harris and Adolph Sanger paying tribute to him. The pallbearers were Julius Bien, Myer S. Isaacs, Adolph Sanger, Adolphus Solomons, David T. Hays, Michael H. Cardozo, Kiliaen van Rensselaer, and M. M. Davis. His funeral was attended by, among other people, The Jewish Messenger editor Abram S. Isaacs, Philip Cowen of The American Hebrew, United Hebrew Charities president Henry Rice, ex-Coroner Moritz Ellinger, ex-United States Counsel to Japan N. J. Newwitter, Counsel General of Guatemala Jacob Baiz, General Thomas Ewing Jr., William Perry Fogg, Josephus Flavius Holloway, General Wager Swayne, Rabbi Alexander Kohut, Rabbi Kaufmann Kohler, multiple relatives (including Cyrus Sulzberger), and representatives from a large number of associations. He was buried in Beth Olam Cemetery.
