= Daniel P. Hays =

American lawyer

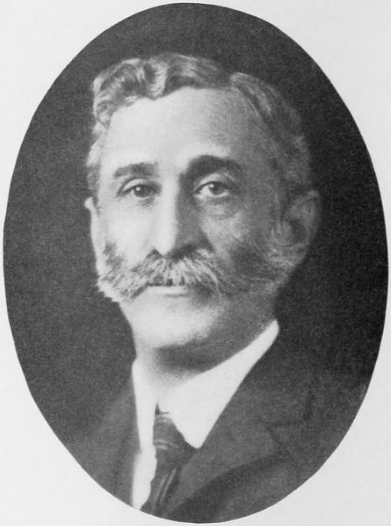
- Born: Daniel Peixotto Hays; March 28, 1854; Pleasantville, New York, US
- Died: November 24, 1923 (aged 69); New York, New York, US
- Education: College of the City of New York; Columbia Law School
- Occupation: Lawyer
- Political party: Democratic
- Spouse: Rachel Hershfield (m. 1880)
- Children: 6
- Parents: David Hays (father); Judith Salzedo Peixotto (mother)

Signature
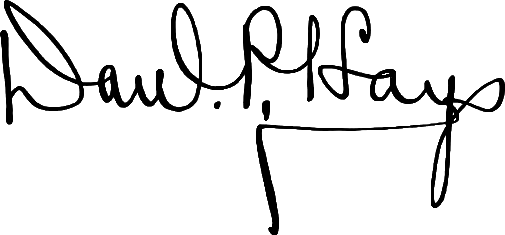

Daniel Peixotto Hays (March 28, 1854 – November 24, 1923) was a Jewish-American lawyer from New York.

== Life ==
Hays was born on March 28, 1854, in Pleasantville, New York. He was the son of David Hays, a pharmacist and treasurer of the College of Pharmacy of the City of New York, and Judith Salzedo Peixotto.

Hays attended the Thirteenth Street public school in New York City and graduated from the College of the City of New York in 1873. He then went to Columbia Law School, graduating from there in 1875. He began working in the law office of Carpentier & Beach as an office boy while studying, and by the time he graduated he became managing clerk of the firm. In 1877, he became a partner with the firm's senior member ex-Judge Elias J. Beach. Beach died a few months later, after which Hays associated with James S. Carpentier under the firm name Carpentier & Hays. The firm was dissolved upon Carpentier's death in 1886. He then became associated with Samuel Greenbaum in the law firm Hays & Greenbaum. In 1898, Abraham Hershfield joined the firm and it became known as Hays, Greenbaum & Hershfield. The firm's clients included some of the most prominent businesspeople in New York City, including General Adam Badeau against the executors of Ulysses S. Grant's estate for services in preparing Grant's memoirs, and was counsel for General Daniel E. Sickles during the latter's term as Sheriff of New York County.

Hays' partnership with Greenbaum lasted for seventeen years, after which Greenbaum became a New York Supreme Court Justice. Hays then formed the law firm Hays & Hershfield, followed by Hays, Hershfield & Wolf. He was a partner in the latter law firm until his death. He was a director of a number of companies, including the Mt. Pleasant Bank. He was also a member of the Palisades Interstate Park Commission, vice-chairman of the Westchester County Commission on county government, a trustee of the Bedford State Reformatory for Women, treasurer and member of the board of managers of the Westchester County Normal School, a trustee of the Westchester Historical Society, and president of the Harlem Law Library. He was also a director of the Jewish Chautauqua Circle, treasurer of the Harlem Foundation for Jewish Communal Work, governor of The Judeans, a director of the Montefiore Home, secretary of the Jewish Theological Seminary, and a board member of the Hebrew Orphan Asylum, Mt. Sinai Hospital, the Home for Aged and Infirm Hebrews, B'nai B'rith, and the Educational Alliance. During World War I, he was chairman of the Selective Service Board for Westchester County District 5 and a member of the Committee of Safety of Westchester County.

An early supporter of the Young Men's Hebrew Association, he served as its director for many years and was its vice-president in 1878 and president from 1879 to 1880. He was also president of the Mount Morris Club, a large and influential social organization in the upper part of New York City. He was a founder of The American Hebrew and was on its original board of editors. He moved to Nyack in 1880, living there for some years. While there, he was a delegate from Rockland County in the 1884 Democratic State Convention, which nominated David B. Hill for governor. He also purchased the Nyack City and County, a prominent local publication, to make it supportive of Grover Cleveland, and while the paper later fell out of his hands it remained a notable Democratic paper. In November 1893, he was appointed Commissioner of Appraisal and in charge of grades in the Twenty-third and Twenty-fourth wards in New York City. He was made Civil Service Commissioner later that year, and he became Chairman of the Board following the death of the former Chairman.

Hays became president of Temple Israel in Harlem in 1889. In 1898, he was elected village president of Pleasantville. In 1905, he published his Collected Poems. He was active in New York City and Westchester County politics, serving as a delegate to several state Democratic conventions and as president of Harlem Democratic Club. He was also active in Jewish communal affairs, serving as trustee and secretary of the Jewish Publication Society and on the executive committee of the Union of American Hebrew Congregations. While serving in the latter position, he was selected the Union's permanent chairman at its 1923 Golden Jubilee Convention in New York.

Hays was a member of the American Bar Association, the New York State Bar Association, the Westchester County Bar Association, and the Jewish Historical Society. In 1880, he married Rachel Hershfield, sister of his law partner Abraham Hershfield. Their children were Judith Piexotto (wife of Max Goldsmith), Florence (wife of Joseph J. Corn), Edwin Daniel, Mabel Ray (wife of Irving Lachenbruch), Bessie (wife of Paul Dreifuss), and Helen (wife of Irvin Auerbach).

Hays died at home from a short illness on November 24, 1923. His funeral was held in Temple Israel. The honorary pallbearers included Oscar Strauss, ex-Judge Samuel Greenbaum, Dr. Stephen S. Wise, Federal Judge Julian W. Mack, Adolph S. Ochs, Walter Law Jr., and David M. Bressler. He was buried in Mount Hope Cemetery in Westchester County.
