= Bressler =

Bressler is a surname. Notable people with the surname include:

- Bernard H. Bressler, Canadian physiologist and neuroscientist
- Charles Bressler (1926–1996), American tenor
- Clotilde Bressler-Gianoli (1875–1912), Swiss-born opera singer
- David M. Bressler (1879–1942), German-American social worker
- Raymond G. Bressler, Sr. (1887–1948), American academic and college president
- Rube Bressler (1894–1966), American baseball player
- Shikma Bressler (born 1980), Israeli physicist

Fictional characters:

- General Bressler, character in Falling Skies

== See also ==
- 14977 Bressler, main-belt asteroid
- Bressler-Enhaut-Oberlin, Pennsylvania, census-designated place (CDP) in Swatara Township, Dauphin County, Pennsylvania, United States
- Bresler
- Bresser
