= Finkenberg's Sons Furniture =

Defunct furniture store chain in New York City

Finkenberg’s Sons Furniture was a New York City-based luxury-furniture department store chain that operated from 1870 to 1948.

== History ==
Finkenberg’s Sons Furniture Inc. was a furniture department store chain founded in Manhattan in 1870, and by 1940, the company expanded across New York City, becoming one of the largest furniture retail chains in the New York metropolitan area. After Adolph Finkenberg’s death in 1914, the firm was managed by his four eldest sons: Edward, Sam, Frederick, and Israel.

In 1919, access to the corporate headquarters, located on 2279 Third Avenue, was impeded by the closure of the ferry line between Yorkville, Manhattan and Queens. As a result, the company’s President, Frederick Finkenberg, was appointed to the board of the Triborough Bridge and tasked with creating an additional gateway into Manhattan. A decade later, as the Triborough Bridge’s Reception Committee Chairman, Finkenberg assisted in the organization of the bridge’s dedication ceremony, attended by President Franklin D. Roosevelt, Mayor Fiorello La Guardia, and Governor Herbert Lehman.

Finkenberg’s Sons opened its flagship store in 1927, which encompassed a five-story building that expanded the entire block across from Bloomingdale's. It was at this location that the first Jumbo Philco, billed as the world's largest radio, was on display for public viewing.

Finkenberg’s Sons Furniture continued to thrive despite the Great Depression. In 1938, the company opened a store across the Hudson River, and a year later, an expansive outlet was added to the chain's mantel, located on 36th Street and Eighth Avenue.

Finkenberg’s Sons introduced a novel layaway plan to the United States and was known for its motto: “Friendly credit since 1870.” During a 1941 broadcast on Philco Playhouse Network, Finkenberg’s Sons Inc. was recognized for its innovative financing.

In 1948, Finkenberg’s Sons was sold and renamed Finkenberg’s Furniture Co, and the furniture chain's midtown location, between 58th and 59th Streets and Lexington and Third Avenues, was transformed into Alexander's Department Store.

Adolph Finkenberg was a founding member of New York City’s Temple Israel, contributed to helping orphans, and sheltered African Americans during New York City's race riots in the early 1900s. His legacy is that of an entrepreneur and a passionate advocate for the marginalized. Adolph Finkenberg; his wife, Emma; along with his eight children; and their spouses rest in the family’s mausoleum located in Mount Hope Cemetery in New York.
