= Philip Cowen =

Jewish-American newspaper publisher and immigration official

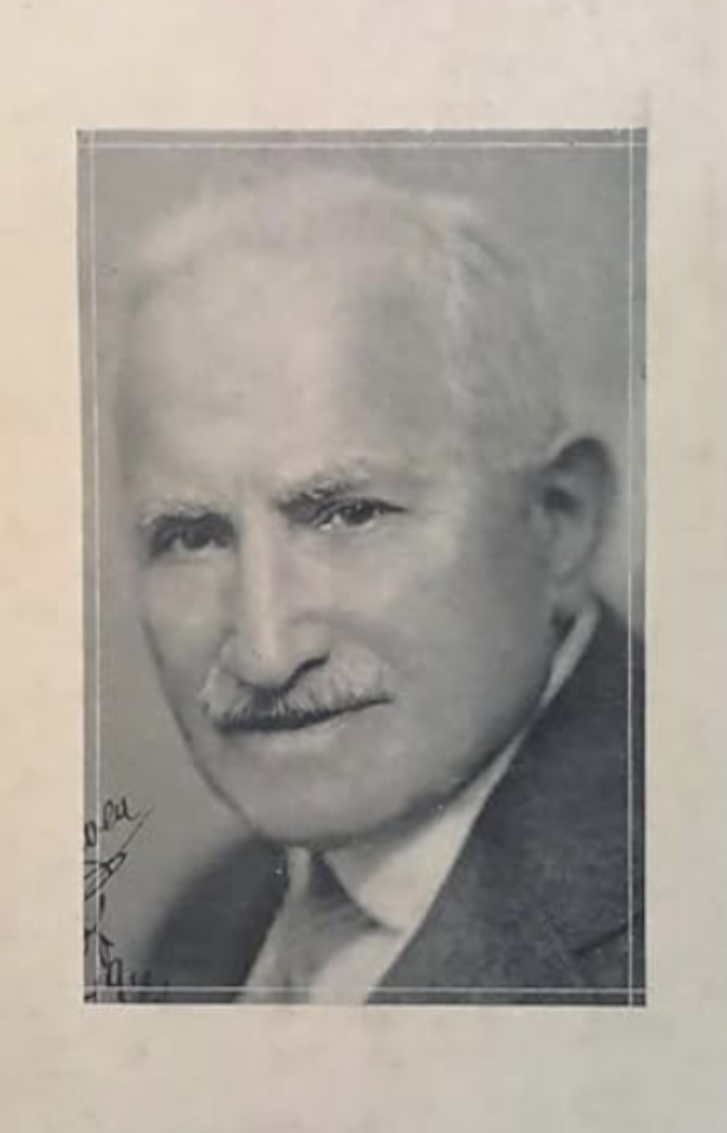
- Born: July 26, 1853; New York City, New York, USA
- Died: April 20, 1943 (aged 89); New Rochelle, New York, USA
- Occupations: Newspaper Publisher; Immigration Official
- Years active: 1878-1927
- Known for: Founding The American Hebrew

Philip Cowen (July 26, 1853 – April 20, 1943) was a Jewish-American newspaper publisher and immigration official. He is the founder and head publisher of Jewish magazine The American Hebrew. He and his magazine played a role in influencing the visibility of civil issues during and following the rise of Jewish immigrants in the US.

== Life ==
Cowen was born on July 26, 1853, on 140 Walker Street in New York City, New York. His father was Raphael Isaac Keil, a German immigrant from Grätz, Prussia who worked as a tailor and changed his surname to Cowen when he briefly lived in England. His mother was Julia Manasseh from Janowitz in the Province of Posen.

Cowen grew up on the Lower East Side and attended the local public schools. He then went to the religious school in the Portuguese Synagogue. When he was thirteen, he began working at odd jobs like in stockyards, with a malt extract concern, and with a glass manufacturer. In 1878, he entered the printing business with Henry Kahrs. A year later, he was a founder of The American Hebrew together with Frederic de Sola Mendes, H. Pereira Mendes, Daniel P. Hays, Cyrus L. Sulzberger, Solomon Solis Cohen, Max Cohen, Jacob Fonseca de Silva Solis, and Samuel Greenbaum and became the paper's publisher. He served as the paper's publisher for 27 year and was an active participant in the major issues and campaigns during the era of mass Jewish immigration. He also proved instrumental in publishing works from, among other figures, Oscar S. Straus, Max J. Kohler, Henry Pereira Mendes, Emma Lazarus, Mary Antin, and Alexander Kohut. He published the paper until 1906. He was also publisher of the Memorial Monthly Magazine and secretary and governor of The Judaeans.

Cowen supported the organization of the Young Men's Hebrew Association and helped care for Russian Jewish immigrants that arrived in the early 1880s. He collected Jewish synagogue statistics for the 1890 census, and in 1902 he was appointed supervisor of The City Record, an important office in the New York City municipal government. He served in the latter position until 1903. In 1905, President Theodore Roosevelt appointed him to the United States Immigration Service. In 1906, he was sent on a special mission to report on the causes of the large migration from Southern and Eastern Europe. He arrived in Russia shortly after 937 Jews were killed all over the country during a wave of pogroms, and despite the danger he insisted on personally visiting some of the towns where Jewish homes were looted and razed to gather first-hand information he included in his official report. He looked into conditions on Jews in other Southern and Eastern European countries, notably Romania, and was partly responsible for a large number of refugees immigrating to America. He worked with the Immigration Service in Ellis Island for 22 years, retiring in 1927. In 1932, he wrote Memories of an American Jew.

Cowen was involved in B'nai B'rith for over 50 years, serving as secretary and treasurer of the local lodge. In 1888, he married Lillie Goldsmith. They had one daughter, Elfrida.

Cowen died at his home in New Rochelle on April 20, 1943. He was buried in Mt. Neboh Cemetery in Brooklyn.
