= N. Taylor Phillips =

American politician (1868–1955)

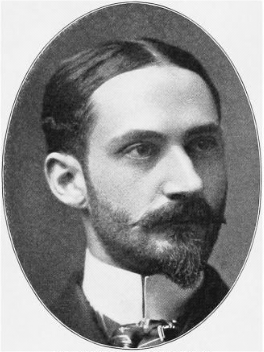

Member of the New York State Assembly
- In office 1898–1900
- Constituency: New York County 9th District

Personal details
- Born: Naphtali Taylor Phillips; December 5, 1868 New York, New York, US
- Died: April 30, 1955 (aged 86) New York, New York, US
- Resting place: Beth Olam Cemetery
- Party: Democratic
- Spouse: Rosalie Solomons (m. 1892)
- Education: Columbia Law School
- Occupation: Lawyer, politician

Naphtali Taylor Phillips (December 5, 1868 – April 30, 1955) was an American lawyer and politician from New York.

== Life ==
Phillips was born on December 5, 1868, in New York City, New York to a Jewish family, as the son of Isaac Phillips and Miriam Trimble. His father was appraiser of the Port of New York, a commissioner of the New York City Board of Education, editor of various New York City newspapers, grand master of the New York State Freemasons, and an active member of the New York Chamber of Commerce.

Phillips graduated from Columbia Law School with an LL.B. in 1888. He was admitted to the state bar when he was 21, and three years later he was admitted to the federal bar. He succeeded his father's law practice and, like his father, specialized in tariff and revenue laws. He later became a member of the law firm Phillips, Leibell & Fielding.

By 1898, Phillips' law office was in the Equitable Life Building. In 1897, he was elected to the New York State Assembly as a Democrat, representing the New York County 9th District. He served in the Assembly in 1898, 1899, and 1900. A supporter of organized labor, he spoke in favor of and voted for public measures meant for the relief of the people while in the Assembly like cheap gas, cheap telephone, a constitutional anti-trust law, and a school teachers' salary bill. He was thanked in writing for his efforts by the American Federation of Labor, the Merchants' Association of New York, and prominent business houses in the city. He helped defeat bills that would have deprived poor people of protection in savings banks and a five-percent interest bill that would have prevented small shopkeepers from procuring credit. He also worked to compel street railroad companies to provide shelter stations at transfer points, fought to prevent four trolley tracks on Amsterdam Avenue, was a leader on the Ford Franchise Tax Bill that obliged corporations to pay their just share of taxation, passed a bill to provide for a Public Park, was instrumental in passing the Anti-Ramapo Bill, and was a member of the 1900 Joint Statutory Revision Committee that prepared plans to revise the state's laws.

Phillips was an organizer of the Greater New York Democracy that helped elect Seth Low in 1901. He served as secretary of the Sinking Fund Commission from 1902 to 1910. In 1902, he was also appointed Deputy New York City Comptroller, an office he was reappointed to twice. As First Deputy Comptroller, he was head of New York's Finances under Comptroller Edward M. Grout. He held that position until 1910. He was chairman of the Board of Revision of Assessment from 1904 to 1910 and vice-president of the Hudson Fulton Commission from 1906 to 1909. He was a delegate to the 1912 Democratic National Convention and a delegate to the 1916 Democratic National Convention. When America entered World War I, he wanted to enter military service. He was nearly fifty at the time and had difficulty getting accepted into the armed forces, but he eventually became a captain in the Army and spent the war serving in Washington, D.C.

Phillips became clerk of Congregation Shearith Israel after his father's death, an office he held for 32 years. He also served as its president for eight years. When the synagogue dedicated its new building in 1897, he wrote a history on the congregation that was published in the Publications of the American Jewish Historical Society and The American Hebrew. In 1954, when he was 85, he was one of the two men who opened the synagogue's doors for a reconsecration ceremony as part of the national tercentenary celebration of the settlement of Jews in the United States. In 1892, he was a founder of the American Jewish Historical Society. He became a director of the Society in 1893, served as treasurer and honorary vice-president, and wrote at least ten articles for its Publications on his colonial American forebears and Congregation Shearith Israel (which his ancestors were prominently associated with for over 200 years). He was also a life member of the New-York Historical Society and an honorary vice-president of the Federation of American Zionists.

Phillips was vice-president of the Union of Orthodox Congregations of America, a director of the Home for Hebrew Infants and the Israel Orphan Asylum, and treasurer of the Columbia Religious and Industrial School for Jewish Girls, the Society Hebra Hased Va Amet, and the American Scenic and Historic Preservation Society. He was a member of the Sons of the American Revolution, the New York County Lawyers' Association, the New York City Bar Association, the New York State Bar Association, the Municipal Art Society, the Rhode Island Historical Society, the Law Committee of Tammany Hall, the American Red Cross, the Freemason, the Elks, the Friendly Sons of St. Patrick, the American Legion, and the Royal Arcanum.

In 1892, Phillips married Rosalie Solomons, daughter of Adolphus Solomons. She served as Tammany co-leader of the Seventh Assembly District from 1918 to 1939.

Phillips died at home on April 30, 1955. He was buried in Beth Olam Cemetery.

New York State Assembly
Preceded by James F. Maccabe	New York State Assembly; New York County, 9th District; 1898–1900	Succeeded by William H. Wilson
