= Moritz Ellinger =

American journalist and politician (1830–1907)

Moritz Ellinger (October 17, 1830 – August 27, 1907) was a Kingdom of Bavaria-born Jewish-American journalist and city official.

== Life ==
Ellinger was born on October 17, 1830, in Fürth, Kingdom of Bavaria, the son of Jacob Hirsch Ellinger and Jochabed Fegersheim. He was educated at the Fürth Orphan Asylum and spent two years studying at the Würzburg Yeshiva under Seligman Baer Bamberger.

Ellinger immigrated to America in 1854 and initially worked in the importation of rare books. He then entered political life, running as a Republican against Fernando Wood in the strongly Democratic New York's 9th congressional district in the 1870 United States House of Representatives election. He lost the election to Wood and came in third place. From 1873 to 1876, he served as apportionment clerk in the New York City Department of Finance. He then served as Coroner of New York City from 1876 to 1881. He then became record clerk and interpreter of the Surrogate's Court from 1881 until his death.

Prominently identified with B'nai B'rith, Ellinger served as secretary of its executive committee from 1869 to 1879, corresponding secretary from 1895 to 1905, and an executive committee member. He founded the Jewish Times and served as its editor from 1869 to 1878. An advocate of Reform Judaism, he used the paper to express the views of Rabbi David Einhorn. In 1882, he toured Europe on behalf of American Jewish leaders to help organize the migration of Russian Jewish refugees. He edited the Menorah Monthly, the official organ of B'nai B'rith, for twelve years following the death of Benjamin F. Peixotto.

Ellinger was secretary of the Goethe Club and the Palette Club, corresponding secretary of the Medico-Legal Society, a member of the Society of American Authors, a fellow of the New York Academy of Sciences, and chairman of the Council of the Congress of Tuberculosis. He instituted the first B'nai B'rith lodge in Germany. In 1876, he married Julia Waterman, with Rabbi David Einhorn officiating the marriage. They had a son and a daughter.

Ellinger died at his home in Mount Vernon on August 27, 1907. His funeral took place in Temple Beth-El. He was buried in the Beth-El Cemetery in Ridgewood, Queens.
