= Lillie Cowen =

Lillie Goldsmith Cowen
- Born: 24 October 1850; London
- Died: 27 September 1939 (aged 88)
- Citizenship: United Kingdom; United States
- Occupations: Publisher, scholar and translator
- Spouse(s): Isaak Goldsmith, Philip Cowen

Lillie Goldsmith Cowen (often Mrs. Philip Cowen) (24 October 1850 – 27 September 1939) was a British-American scholar and translator, who became the first woman to translate the Haggadah into English.

== Biography ==
Cowen, who descended from a family of Irish Jewish scholars, was born in London, UK, but emigrated to the United States when she was eleven months old. There she grew up and married her second cousin Isaak Goldsmith (Goudsmit) who died in 1876. In 1887, she remarried to Philip Cowen, who was the first publisher of the Jewish weekly newspaper The American Hebrew. She worked with him on publishing the paper until 1906, when he retired.

In 1904, she published the Cowen Haggadah, which was the first American English adaptation of the haggadah to be published for a mass audience. It became the most popular haggadah in the United States in the first quarter of the twentieth century, with distribution of 295,000 copies by 1935.

Up until then, all American traditional Haggadot had used translations based on those created by David Levi and Isaac Levi (London).

In the preface to the Cowen Haggadah, Lillie writes:

"At a Seder service given to a number of friends, their wives and older children, the thought occurred to me that the service was marred because of typographical blunders, bad grammar, and mis-translations which abounded in the books used, and, as I knew, in all the books obtainable in this country. I determined, therefore, if the Lord spared me, to issue in the near future a Haggada which would not cause derision among the younger generation but which would be read with interest and with reverence."

In the publisher's introduction, we find:

"In “Who Knows” some liberty has been taken with numbers eight and nine, in view of the fact that this part of the service is especially designed for the children." and indeed, if we look at this section we find:

"Q: Who knoweth Eight? A. Eight? I know: There are the Eight lights of Hanuka. Q: Who knoweth Nine? A. Nine? I know: Nine was the day in Ab when the holy city was twice destroyed., wherefore a fast was observed.

Lillie Cowen was not the first to shy away from the traditional phrase "Nine months of pregnancy". The Victorian Rabbi/Rev. A.A. Green had already censored this term in his 1897 "Revised Hagada" under the auspicious of Chief Rabbi Adler. He had come up with the idea that there are 9 festivals in the Jewish year. Lillie's "solution" to use the 9th of Av instead, can be traced back to much older “Ashkenazi” translations, e.g. in the 1712 Amsterdam Haggadah.

However, whereas all the men before her had found it only necessary to censor the nine months of pregnancy, she as a woman felt the need to censor the eight days of circumcision as well.

Cowen died in New Rochelle, New York.

== Sources ==
- Goldman, Yosef. Hebrew Printing in America, 1735-1926, A History and Annotated Bibliography (YGBooks 2006). ISBN 1-59975-685-4.
- Roos, Avraham. Hanukkah in the Haggadah, blogpost Dec 9, 2016
