= Maurice Harris =

Maurice Harris may refer to:

- Maurice Harris (boxer) (born 1976), American boxer
- Maurice Harris (American football) (born 1992), American football player
- Maurice H. Harris (1859–1930), rabbi of Temple Israel of Harlem
- Mickey Harris (Maurice Charles Harris, 1917–1971), American baseball player
