= Max J. Kohler =

American lawyer (1871–1934)

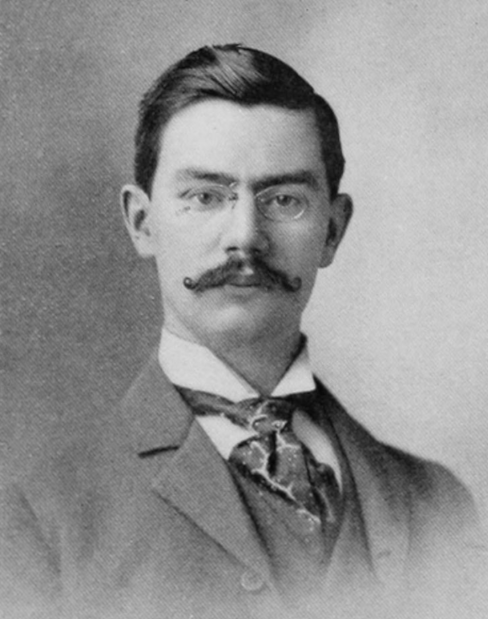
- Born: Max James Kohler; May 22, 1871; Detroit, Michigan, US
- Died: July 23, 1934 (aged 63); Long Lake, New York, US
- Occupations: Lawyer, historian
- Spouse: Winifred Lichtenauer (m. 1906; died 1922)
- Parents: Kaufmann Kohler (father); Johanna Einhorn (mother)

Max James Kohler (May 22, 1871 – July 23, 1934) was a Jewish-American lawyer, immigration activist, and historian from New York.

== Life ==
Kohler was born on May 22, 1871, in Detroit, Michigan, the son of Kaufmann Kohler and Johanna Einhorn. His parents were both Jewish German immigrants, and his father and maternal grandfather David Einhorn were both prominent rabbis in the American Reform Judaism. When David Einhorn died in 1879, Kohler moved with his family to New York City, where his father took David Einhorn's place as rabbi of Congregation Beth-El.

Kohler graduated from the College of the City of New York with a B.S. in 1890, Columbia University School of Political Science with an M.A. in 1891, and Columbia Law School with an LL.B. and the College of the City of New York with an M.S. in 1893. While in Columbia, he won the Constitutional Law Prize and the Civil Service Reform prize, wrote a number of monographs and articles on historical, religious, and legal subjects, and edited Charles P. Daly's 1893 "The Settlement of the Jews in North America." He was admitted to the bar in 1893, and in 1894 he was appointed Junior Assistant to the United States District Attorney. In 1895, he was appointed Assistant United States District Attorney. He held that position until 1898, when he was appointed Special Assistant U.S. District Attorney for an important government case. He was appointed again to the position later that year. In 1898, he became a member of the law firm Lewinson, Kohler & Schattman. He made a speciality of federal court cases. In 1899, he published a monograph on Methods of Review in Criminal Cases in the United States for a large volume published in London called "The Necessity of Criminal Appeal as Illustrated by the Maybrick Case and the Jurisprudence of Various Countries," which was edited by J. H. Levy.

Kohler was involved in a number of notable cases, including U.S. v. Bernard (the first case where postal laws were used to cover the crime of using mail for schemes to defraud), U.S. v. North American Commercial Co. (which involved the alleged liability of government for reducing the taking of seals in the Alaska seal islands under the international fur seal arbitration), three leading cases on immigration laws that reached the United States Supreme Court (Tom Hong v. U.S., Geigow v. Uhl, and Todd v. Waldman), two leading cases on bankruptcy law (re Wilcox and re Lewensohn), and U.S. v. Joint Traffic Assoc. (in which he served as counsel for the federal government and the U.S. Supreme Court construed the anti-trust act as to railroads to embrace restraint that might be deemed reasonable). In 1917, he was the government attorney before the local draft board in New York City.

While working for the District Attorney, Kohler came into contact with another of immigration cases, first related to the Chinese Exclusion Act and later other nationalities. He noted the hardships immigrants were exposed to, and after leaving public office he became involved in a number of immigration cases related to different nationalities and ethnicities, brought them before the U.S. Supreme Court, and created important precedents. Some of his leading cases were fought on behalf of Armenians, Hindus, and Chinese immigrants. He became an authority on immigration law, and legislators and congressional committees sought his advice. He believed the Founding Fathers intended America to be a haven for refugees from all countries, and for most of his career refused to accept remuneration in immigration cases. He wrote a large number of brief and articles and subject, and some of the articles were posthumously collected and published under the title Immigration and Aliens in the United States in 1936.

Kohler served on the commission on Ellis Island and Immigrant Relief in 1933. In his advocacy for immigrants he worked with Oscar S. Straus, Louis Marshall, Simon Wolf, Abram I. Elkus, and other leaders of the Jewish community. He managed to secure rulings which put an end to hardships immigrants suffered from due to arbitrary regulations imposed by administration officials. He opposed restrictions on immigration and naturalization and the registration of aliens, testifying against literacy tests and other immigration restrictions before the United States Senate and House of Representatives on behalf of the Union of American Hebrew Congregations and the American Jewish Committee. In 1910, he became a member of the Board of Delegates on Civil Rights of the Union of American Hebrew Congregations and collaborated with its chairman Simon Wolf. When the Board of Delegates on Civil Rights was abolished in 1926, he became an executive committee member of the American Jewish Committee. In 1931, he prepared two extensive briefs to attack an alien registration law passed by the Michigan state legislature and Rutgers University's intention to limit Jewish enrollment. Both measures were successfully defeated. When Jews began to be persecuted in Nazi Germany, he published articles and pamphlets that encouraged the American government to persuade the Nazi government to change its position.

By 1906, Kohler wrote "Rebecca Franks: an American Jewish Belle of the Last Century" in 1894, a pamphlet on Chinese exclusion immigration, and a chapter called "Jews and Judaism in America" for Halliday and Gregory's 1896 "The Church in America and Its Baptism of Fire." He was a contributor to the Publications of the American Jewish Historical Society, The Jewish Encyclopedia, The American Hebrew, the Menorah Monthly, and the Albany Law Journal, and was an occasional special correspondent for The New York Times. He was recording secretary of the American Jewish Historical Society from 1901 to 1903 and became its corresponding secretary in 1903. He was a founder of the Society, was active in its council meetings, regularly wrote articles for its Publications, and served as one of its vice-president by the time he died. He left his library of Judaica to the Society in his will.

Kohler was Honorary Secretary of the Baron de Hirsch Fund from 1905 until his death. He was also Honorary Secretary of the National Committee for the Celebration of the 250th Anniversary of the Settlement of Jews in the United States in 1905. He served for many years on the Committee on Legislation of the New York County Lawyers' Association and the Committee on Federal Legislation of the New York City Bar Association. He was also in the American Jewish Congress and B'nai B'rith.

Kohler wrote the article "Jews in America" for the Encyclopedia Americana. He was a vice-president of The Judaeans, an advisory board member of Temple Beth-El, and a member of the American Economic Association, the American Academy of Political and Social Science, the Civil Service Reform Association, Phi Beta Kappa, and the American Historical Association. In 1925, Hebrew Union College gave him an honorary Doctor of Hebrew Laws degree. He also edited and wrote two supplemental chapters of Luigi Luzzatti's book God in Freedom in 1930. In 1906, he married Winifred Lichtenauer. They had no children, and she died in 1922.

Kohler died from an attack of angina pectoris at the Hotel Sagamore in Long Lake on July 23, 1934. He was staying there on vacation for his health. Several hundred people attended his funeral service in Temple Emanu-El, including United Jewish Appeal chairman Felix M. Warburg, Dr. George Alexander Kohut's widow Rebekah Kohut, Zionist Organization of America president Morris Rothenberg, Jewish Academy of Arts and Science president Dr. Henry Keller, Sarah Schottenfeld of the National Council of Jewish Women, Philip Cowen of B'nai B'rith, Oscar Leonard of the American Jewish Congress, United States Circuit Court Judge Julian W. Mack, and Alfred A. Cook. He was buried in Beth-El Cemetery in Cypress Hills.
