= United States v. Balsara =

Court case

United States v. Balsara (1910)
- Court: United States Court of Appeals for the Second Circuit
- Decided: 1910
- Defendant: Bhicaji Balsara
- Plaintiff: United States
- Citation: Not specified

Case history
- Subsequent action: The court's decision in this case established that the term "free white persons" should be construed as a reference to race rather than specific national origins for naturalization eligibility in the United States.

Court membership
- Judge sitting: Not specified

Case opinions
- The court's interpretation was based on the legislative purpose to encompass individuals of the white race within the scope of naturalization eligibility, regardless of their particular national backgrounds.

United States v. Balsara (1910) was a case in which the United States Court of Appeals for the Second Circuit decided that Bhicaji Balsara, a Parsee Immigrant, was eligible for citizenship in the United States. This case served as an early racial prerequisite case that defined the definition of whiteness, where the court determined that people who were caucasian, under the racial thinking of the time, were white. In 1923, in the case of United States v. Bhagat Singh Thind, the court dismissed the prior definition of "Caucasian" and, instead, adopted the standard of common understanding. The court determined that "White" referred to immigrants from Northern or Western Europe.

== Court Case ==
In 1906, Balsara filed a petition for citizenship under section 2169 of the United States Revised Statutes in 1906. In the case of Balsara,171 Fed. Rep. 294 (1909), which was decided by the Circuit Court of New York, the initial presiding judge, Emile Henry Lacombe, granted Balsara's petition under section 2169 of the United States Revised Statutes. The statute states, regarding naturalization, that: “The provisions of this title shall apply to aliens being free white persons and to aliens of African nativity and to persons of African descent.”

As evidenced by the court's closing remarks, qualities such as high character and intelligence notably shaped the decision . Given that Balsara displayed the qualities of a person of outstanding character and remarkable intelligence, the court made the choice to approve Balsara's naturalization request. Consequently, the court employed these qualities as the tie-breaker in a borderline case.

After his petition was granted, The United States sought review of the decision of the Circuit Court of the United States for the Southern District of New York. The United States contended that Balsara was not white within the meaning of the statute. Balsara attempted to be classified as a "free white person" within the meaning of the Revised Statutes, contending that he was a part of the "white race."

== Background ==
A merchant and Parsee Immigrant from Bombay, India, Bhicaji Balsara, who was a pure descendent of the Persian sect arrived in the United States in 1900. He arrived in the United States as a cotton buyer for the Tata Group and married Louise D. Balsara in New York. The two purchased a house in Bergen, New Jersey. He applied for U.S. citizenship based on section 2169 of the United States Revised Statutes in 1906. The case then reached The United States Court of Appeals for the Second Circuit.

Balsara was aided in his appeal by the minuscule Syrian-American community in New York. They enlisted the services of Louis Marshall and Max J. Kohler, both of whom had previously assisted Syrian immigrants in their naturalization efforts. Marshall and Kohler were actively engaged in endeavors to safeguard the rights of Jewish immigrants seeking naturalization, including efforts to prevent the Census Bureau from introducing a separate racial classification like "Hebrew" that would have categorized Jews as non-White.

== Arguments ==
The central question was whether Balsara, originally from India, was entitled to naturalization based on the specific racial criteria laid out in section 2169. The United States argued that Balsara did not qualify for naturalization because, in their view, Congress intended this privilege only for immigrants from England, Ireland, Scotland, Wales, Germany, Sweden, France, and Holland, asserting that it was essential to consider and assess the historical context and the intent of Congress at the time when the relevant naturalization laws were enacted. The United States argued that because there were no documented instances of significant immigration to the United States from countries beyond those specifically listed (England, Ireland, Scotland, Wales, Germany, Sweden, France, and Holland) during the relevant historical period, it is reasonable to conclude that Congress intended naturalization to be applicable exclusively to immigrants from these specified nations.

Balsara asserted that the expression "free white persons" should be construed within a racial framework rather than being tied to particular national backgrounds. He maintained that the statute sought to grant naturalization privileges to individuals affiliated with the white or Caucasian race, irrespective of their nation of birth.

== Decision ==
The court upheld Balsara's position, asserting that the term "free white persons" should be construed as a reference to race rather than specific national origins. The court argued that the statute was intended to grant naturalization rights to individuals belonging to the white or Caucasian race, distinguishing them from individuals of other racial groups such as black, red, yellow, or brown races.

The court reinforced this interpretation by referencing established legal precedents and authoritative opinions that had previously endorsed this perspective. They contended that although the Congressmen of 1790 may not have possessed in-depth knowledge of ethnological classifications and had not used the term "Caucasian race," the legislative purpose remained evident: to encompass individuals of the white race within the scope of naturalization eligibility, regardless of their particular national backgrounds.
