= Edgar D. Peixotto =

American lawyer

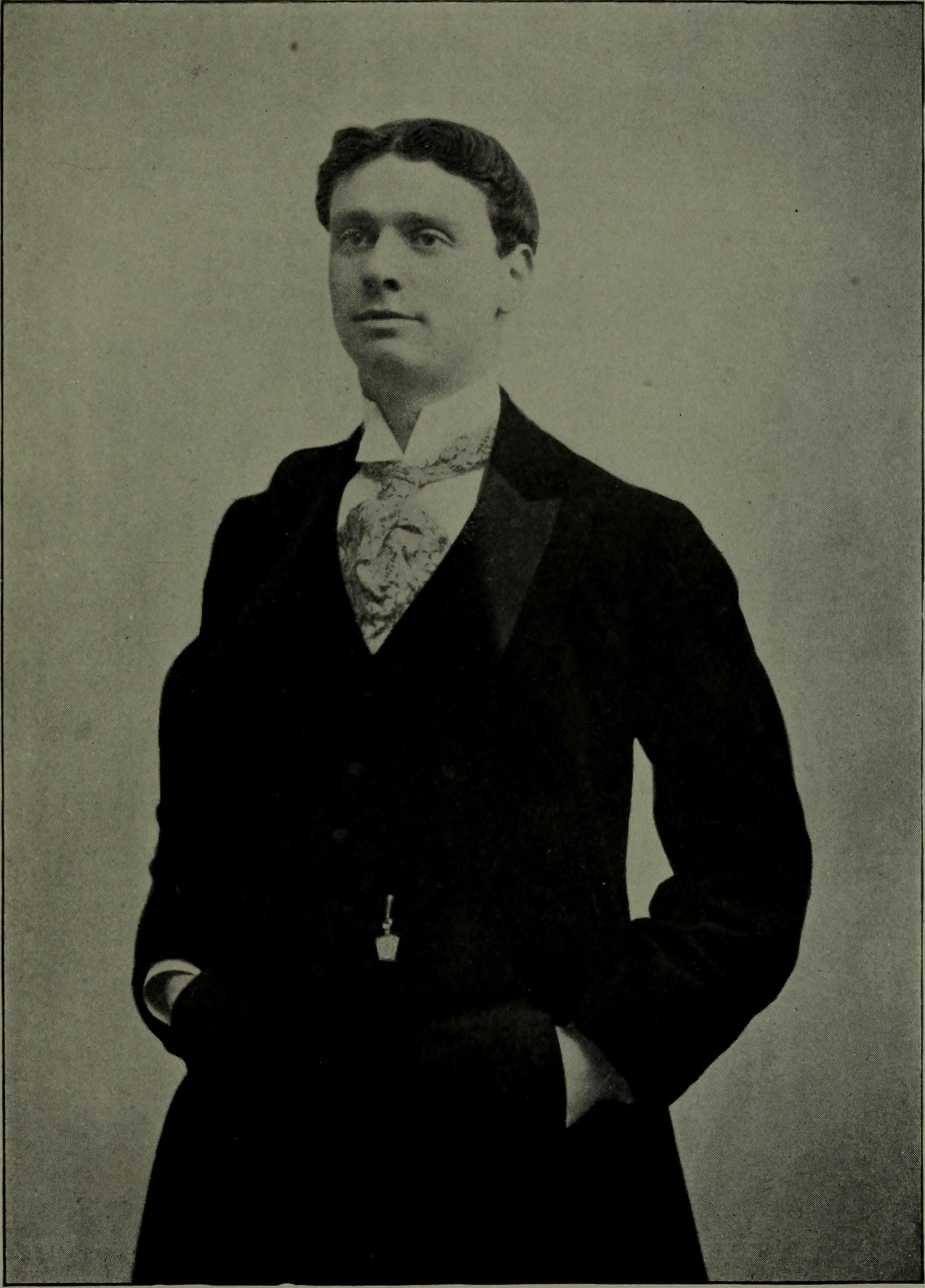
Edgar D. Peixotto, Assistant District Attorney of San Francisco

Edgar Davis Peixotto (December 23, 1867 – June 24, 1925) was a Jewish-American lawyer from California.

== Life ==
Peixotto was born on December 23, 1867, in New York City, New York, the son of merchant Raphael Peixotto and Myrttilla J. Davis. His siblings included artist Ernest C. Peixotto, Major Sidney S. Peixotto, and Professor Jessica B. Peixotto. The family moved to San Francisco, California, when he was a year old.

Peixotto attended San Francisco public schools and graduated from Hastings College of the Law in 1888. He was admitted to the state bar in January 1889, and after spending a year travelling across the United States and Europe he began practicing law in San Francisco. In December 1893, he became assistant District Attorney of San Francisco under William S. Barnes. He conducted the prosecution of Patrick Collins (who was convicted of murder and hanged) and the first trial of Jane Shattuck (who was convinced of murder and sentenced to life in prison until she was granted a new trial), and was Barnes' only assistant counsel in the 1895 trial of Theodore Durrant. He made the opening address to the jury in the latter trial, and in 1899 wrote the history of the case. He resigned from the District Attorney's office shortly after the trial and began a private practice. In 1899, when a new city charter shortened county office terms to one year, he was attorney for sheriff Henry S. Martin. An ardent Republican, he was secretary of the California delegation of the 1900 Republican National Convention and an alternate delegate to the Convention.

Peixotto had a number of clients from the theater, including Nat Goodwin, Lillian Nordica, Édouard de Reszke, Antonio Scotti, E. H. Sothern, and Michael B. Leavitt. Active in various civic and promotional movements, he was an executive committee member of the 1909 Portola Festival and a member of the Panama-Pacific International Exposition Company.

Peixotto was attorney of the Downtown Association of San Francisco for fifteen years and a member of the Freemasons, the San Francisco Chamber of Commerce, the American Bar Association, the California State Bar Association, the San Francisco Bar Association, the Bohemian Club, and the Olympic Club. In 1905, he married Malvina Estelle Nathan. Their children were Edgar R. and Nathan M.

Peixotto died at home following an operation on June 24, 1925.
