= William H. Wilson (New York politician) =

American politician (c. 1873 – 1901)

Member of New York State Assembly

William H. Wilson (c. 1873 – March 27, 1901) was an American politician from New York.

== Life ==
He was born about 1873, in New York City. He attended the public schools, and studied law for some time. Then he became night manager of a taxicab company.

Wilson entered politics as a Democrat, and was appointed as stenographer of the Civil Court in the 8th District. He was a member of the New York State Assembly (New York Co., 9th D.) in 1901.

He died during the legislative session, on March 27, 1901, at his home at 309 West 23rd Street in New York City.

New York State Assembly
Preceded by N. Taylor Phillips	New York State Assembly; New York County, 9th District; 1901	Succeeded by James A. Allen
