= Raphael Peixotto =

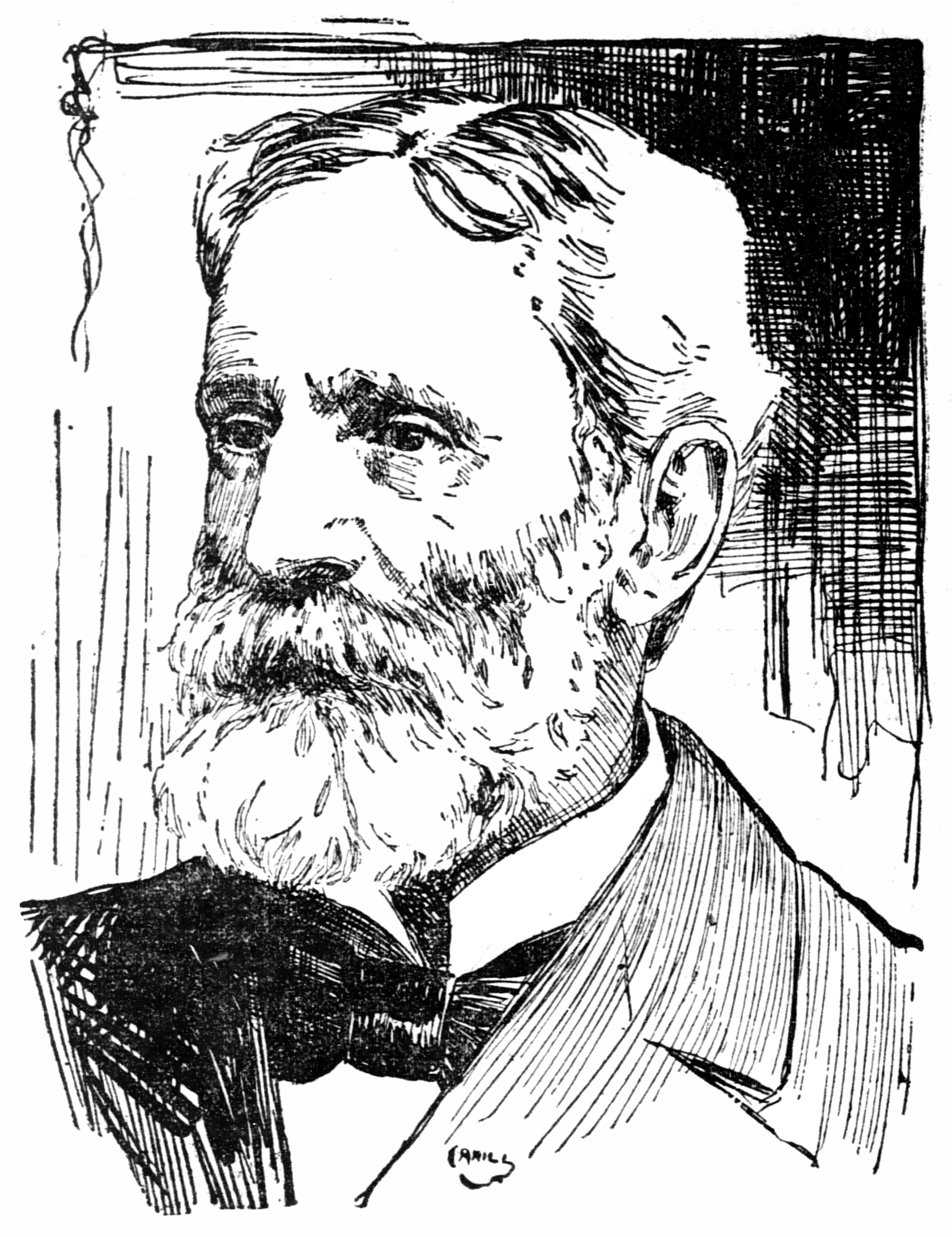

Raphael Peixotto (September 1, 1837 – May 22, 1905) was a Jewish-American merchant from California.

== Life ==
Peixotto was born on September 1, 1837, in Willoughby, Ohio, the son of Dutch immigrant and physician Dr. Daniel L. M. Peixotto. His family was descended from Sephardic Jews expelled from Spain in 1492. His siblings included teacher Judith Salzedo Peixotto and diplomat Benjamin F. Peixotto.

Peixotto moved to San Francisco, California, in around 1870 and became a merchant there. He was identified with a number of Jewish institutions in the city and served as president of Congregation Emanu-El.

In 1863, Peixotto married Myrtilla J. Davis in a ceremony performed by Isaac Leesser and Jacques J. Lyons. Their children were Edgar, Ernest, Sydney, Eustace, and Dr. Jessica.

Peixotto died on May 22, 1905.
