= Bresler =

Bresler is a surname. Notable people with the surname include:

- Anton Bresler (born 1988), South African rugby union player
- Jerry Bresler (1914–2000), American songwriter, conductor
- Jerry Bresler (1908–1977), American film producer

== See also ==
- Bresler Pister yield criterion
- Bresler's Ice Cream, American ice cream chain
- Bressler, a surname
