= Samuel Greenbaum =

American judge

- Born: January 23, 1854; London, England
- Died: August 26, 1930; Larchmont, New York, United States
- Education: College of the City of New York; Columbia Law School
- Occupations: Lawyer, judge
- Known for: Justice of the New York Supreme Court; Associate Justice of the Appellate Division, First Department
- Spouse: Selina Ullman
- Children: Lawrence Samuel; Edward Samuel; Grace; Isabel

Samuel Greenbaum (January 23, 1854 – August 26, 1930) was a Jewish British-American lawyer and judge.

== Life ==
Greenbaum was born on January 23, 1854, in London, England, the son of Lewis Greenbaum and Rachel Schlesinger. When he was two, he immigrated with his family to America, where his father engaged in business in New York City, New York.

Greenbaum graduated from the College of the City of New York in 1875 and spent the next five years working as a teacher. He also read law in the office of Van Siclen, Gildersleeve & Baldwin and attended Columbia Law School, graduating from there in 1875. He was admitted to the bar in 1876, and initially continued studying in the law office. In 1877, he opened a law office and began practicing on his own for the next seven years. He then formed a partnership with Daniel P. Hays called Hays & Greenbaum, renamed Hays, Greenbaum & Hirschfield in 1898. During this time, Greenbaum was involved in a number of cases, including as counsel for General Daniel E. Sickles when the latter was New York City Sheriff. The firm was dissolved in 1901.

In 1900, Greenbaum was appointed to fill an unexpired term on the New York Supreme Court. He was elected to a full term in 1901, and was re-elected in 1915. In 1920, Governor Al Smith designated him Associate Justice of the Appellate Division of the New York Supreme Court, First Judicial Department. He sat there until 1923, when he resigned and resumed his private practice.

Greenbaum was president of the Aguilar Free Library Association, first vice-president of the Educational Alliance, and a trustee of the New York Public Library and the Jewish Theological Seminary of America. He was a member of the New York State Bar Association, the Society of Medical Jurisprudence, and the American Jewish Historical Society. He was also a founder and president of the Young Men's Hebrew Association, vice-president of the Baron de Hirsch Fund, a trustee of the New York County Lawyers' Association, vice-president of the New York City Bar Association, trustee of the League for Political Education, a member of the executive council of the National Jewish Welfare Board, and a member of the New York State Bar Association and the American Bar Association. He was a member of Temple Israel. In 1888, he married Selina Ullman. Their children were Lawrence Samuel, Edward Samuel, Grace, and Isabel.

Greenbaum died in the Royal Victoria Hotel in Larchmont, where he was spending the summer, on August 26, 1930. He was buried in the Temple Israel Cemetery in Hastings-on-Hudson.
