= Bernard H. Bressler =

Canadian biophysicist

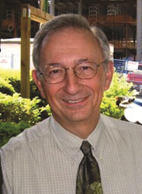
- Born: Winnipeg, Manitoba
- Education: McMaster University; Sir George Williams University; University of Manitoba (MSc, PhD)
- Organization(s): University of British Columbia, Vancouver Coastal Health Research Institute, Rick Hansen Institute

Bernard H. Bressler FCAHS (born 1944) is a professor in the Department of Cellular and Physiological Sciences and an Associate Member in the Department of Orthopedics at the University of British Columbia (UBC).

Bressler has been a provincial and national leader in research, teaching and governance. In 2008, Bressler was inducted as a Fellow of the Canadian Academy of Health Sciences and received the Lifetime Achievement Award from LifeSciences BC for his commitment to the commercialization of innovative technologies. He is currently a member of the Board of the Canada-Israel Industrial Research & Development Foundation (CIIRDF).

== Early life and education ==
Bressler was born in 1944 in Winnipeg, Manitoba. He received his BSc from Sir George Williams University (now Concordia University) in 1966. He received his MSc in anatomy (1968) and PhD in physiology (1972) from the University of Manitoba, and completed his postdoctoral studies in neuroscience at McMaster University.

== Career ==
=== Researcher ===
Bressler's research program in skeletal muscle biophysics received support from the Medical Research Council of Canada and the Canadian Institutes for Health Research for 29 years.

His research focuses on providing new information about the fundamental mechanisms for force production in skeletal muscle. Experiments are designed to test some fundamental assumptions of the cross-bridge model as well as the role of the protein troponin C (TnC) in the regulation of calcium sensitivity in striated muscle.

Part of the research is designed to explore how the level of activation of skeletal muscle is controlled by the calcium binding properties of troponin C – the protein responsible for the initiation of muscle contraction. Troponin C has long been associated with the role of an on/off switch which turns a muscle 'on' by binding calcium or 'off' when it releases calcium. Bressler's lab found that a shift in the balance between calcium being bound or unbound produces a dramatic drop in the maximal levels of tension development. A measurable change in the rate at which tension develops is also observed with this shift in calcium affinity. The TnC project is only one of a series of projects designed to study the mechanical properties of cross-bridges.

=== Educator and administrator ===
Bressler's teaching career began in 1973 at the University of Saskatchewan in the Departments of Anatomy and Physiology. He joined the University of British Columbia in the Department of Anatomy, Faculty of Medicine in 1976.

During his tenure as Vice President of Research at UBC (1996–1999), he was actively involved in the growth of the University Industry Liaison Office, which has become a world leader in development and management of technology transfer and biotechnology spin-offs. For these and other accomplishments in the area of commercialization of inventions, Bressler was recognized in April 2008 with a Lifetime Achievement Award from LifeSciences BC.

From 1999 - 2008, Dr. Bressler served as VP Research, Vancouver Coastal Health and executive director, VCH Research Institute and Associate Dean, Research and Graduate Studies for the Faculty of Medicine at UBC. He oversaw the creation of Vancouver Coastal Health Research Institute, which is one of the top five health research organizations in Canada.

=== Board governance and volunteerism ===
Bressler has held numerous board positions in the life sciences, biotechnology, economic and medical sectors. He has a particular interest in expanding Canada's global reach as it relates to life sciences and commercialization. Bressler has been invited to serve on the boards of the Canada Israel Industrial Research Development Foundation and International Scientific and Technology Partnerships in Canada.

Bressler served as the chair of the board of directors at the Rick Hansen Institute from 2011 to 2017. He was instrumental in helping to broaden the institute's international collaborations in spinal cord injury research and care in Israel. In 2016, RHI was accredited by Imagine Canada and was one of only 170 non-profit organizations in Canada to achieve this standard of excellence at the time.

== Awards ==
Bressler's awards and distinctions include:

- 2000 J.C.B. Grant Award, Canadian Association of Anatomy, Neurobiology and Cell Biology
- 2001 Award of Merit, Canadian Association of Occupational Therapy
- 2008 Lifetime Achievement Award, LifeSciences BC
- 2008 Inductee, Fellow of the Canadian Academy of Health Sciences
- 2011 Honorary Life Membership, Research Canada

== Publications ==
Bressler has co-authored over 30 publications. Select publications include:

- Wilcox, P., C. Milliken, and B.H. Bressler. (1996) High-dose tumor necrosis factor alpha produces an impairment of hamster diaphragm contractility. Attenuation with a prostaglandin inhibitor. Am. J. of Resp. & Critical Care Med. 153, 16_-1615.
- Slawnych, M.P., L. Morishita, and B.H. Bressler (1998). Spectral analysis of muscle fiber images as a means of assessing sarcomere heterogeneity. Biophys. J. 70:38-47.
- Seow, C.Y., L. Morishita, and B.H. Bressler (1998). Milrinone inhibits contractility in skinned skeletal muscle fibers. Am. J. Physiol. 274 (Cell Physiol. 43) C1306-C1311.
