= Jessica Blanche Peixotto =

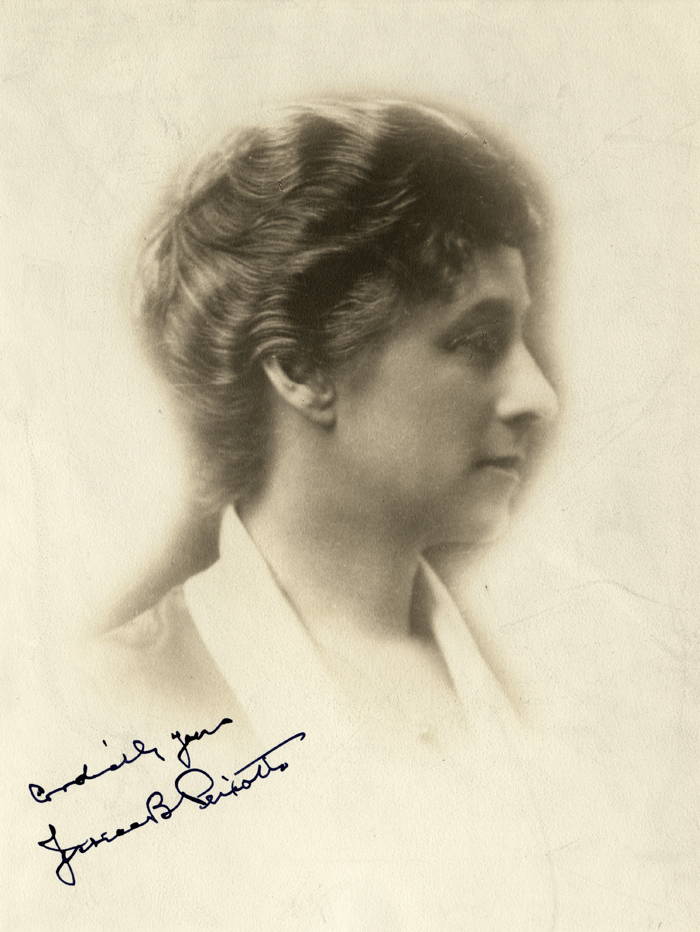
Jessica Blanche Peixotto

Jessica Blanche Peixotto (9 October 1864 in New York City – 19 October 1941) was an American educator and writer.

== Early life and family ==
Jessica Blanche Peixotto was born in New York City, New York, the daughter of Raphael Levy Maduro Peixotto, a prosperous Ohioan involved in trade with the South, and Myrtillie Jessica Davis, originally of Virginia. She had four brothers: Edgar Davis attorney; Ernest Clifford artist and author; Capt. Eustace Maduro director of public school athletics; and Sidney Salzado social worker (director of the Columbia Park Boy's Club in San Francisco and director and organizer of the "All American Boys' Band", a band that toured the world in 1913–1914).

In 1870, the family moved to San Francisco for business reasons of their father: he was president of Congregation Emanu-El, San Francisco and engaged in a mercantile career. In 1891, Peixotto enrolled at the University of California, Berkeley (B.A., 1894). She studied in France for two years. She continued on to graduate study in political science and economics with a Ph.D. in 1900, the second given to a woman at the University of California, after the first was awarded to Milicent Shinn. She was the fourteenth person to receive a Ph.D. at the university. Her thesis was French Revolution and Modern French Socialism (1901).

== Career ==
In 1904, Peixotto joined the faculty at UCB with a lectureship in contemporary socialism, for a salary of US$500. In 1918, she was the first woman to become a full professor (Social Economics) and the first woman to head a department at UCB. She retired in 1935, and received an honorary doctorate in law from Mills College in 1935, and from the University of California in 1936.

She served as vice president of the American Economic Association, and also served from 1912 to 1923 on the California State Board of Charities and Correction.

During World War I she was the executive chairperson of the child welfare department of the Women’s Committee of the Council of National Defense, and she also served as chief of the council’s child conservation section.

She was also a member of the Consumers’ Advisory Board of the National Recovery Administration in 1933.

She was a member of the San Francisco Woman's City Club and the Berkeley Women's Faculty Club.

== Personal life ==
She lived at Cloyne Court, Berkeley, California.

She died in October 1941; Cremation followed her funeral services, which were conducted by Robert F. Leavens of the Unitarian Society and by Monroe E. Deutsch, vice-president and provost of the University of California.

== Works ==
She published Getting and Spending at the Professional Standard of Living (1927) and Cost of Living Studies. II. How Workers Spend a Living Wage: A Study of the Incomes and Expenditures of Eighty-Two Typographers’ Families in San Francisco (1929). A collection of papers and comments Essays in Social Economics in Honor of Jessica Blanche Peixotto (1935) provides full details of her life and published writings.

== Sources ==
- Warren, Donald; Patrick, John (17 April 2006). Civic and Moral Learning in America. Palgrave Macmillan. ISBN 978-1-4039-8472-2.
