= Daniel Levy Maduro Peixotto =

American physician

Daniel Levy Maduro Peixotto

Daniel Levy Maduro Peixotto (July 18, 1800 – May 13, 1843) was a Dutch-born Jewish-American physician.

== Life ==
Peixotto was born on July 18, 1800, in Amsterdam, Holland, the son of Moses Levy Maduro Peixotto and Judith Lopez Salzedo. He studied in Curaçao under Professor Strebeck. His father was a merchant in Curaçao who later became rabbi of Congregation Shearith Israel in New York City following the death of Gershom Mendes Seixas.

Peixotto immigrated to America with his father in 1807 and settled in New York City. He graduated from Columbia College in 1816 where he was a member of the Philolexian Society. He then studied at Columbia University, graduating from there with an M.D. in 1819 and an M.A. in 1825. Before he got his medical degree, he studied medicine in the office of Dr. David Hosack. He spent several years practicing medicine in the West Indies after graduating, returning to New York in 1823. He worked as a physician for the New York City Dispensary, and from 1826 to 1827 he lectured on "abdominal diseases and complain[t]s of females." In 1825, he was a founder of the Academy of Medicine and served as its first secretary. He also helped organize the Society for Assisting the Widows and Orphans of Medical Men, and supported the establishment of a medical library. From 1825 to 1826, he co-edited The New York Medical and Physical Journal with Drs. Beck and Bell. He became sole editor of the Journal in 1829, and wrote a number of articles for it. An active member of the New York County Medical Society, he served as its president from 1830 to 1832.

In 1836, Peixotto was elected an Honorary Member of the Medical Society of Lower Canada and appointed Professor of Theory and Practice of Medicine and Obstetrics. That year, he also became president of the Willoughby Medical College and moved to Cleveland, Ohio, to serve as the college's dean of the faculty for the next several years. He was a close friend of Andrew Jackson, supporting his election to the presidency and editing the True American on his behalf. He was also connected to the New-York Mirror when it was under the control of N. P. Willis and George P. Morris. While teaching in Willoughby, he was contacted by a Mormon Temple in Kirtland to teach the congregation Hebrew. He resigned from the Medical College in 1838 and continued practicing medicine in Cleveland for the next few years.

Peixotto, like his father before him, was active in Freemasonry and served Master of the Washington Lodge in 1833. In 1813, his father Moses Levy Maduro Peixotto had been one of the six founding members of the Supreme Council, Scottish Rite, Northern Jurisdiction.

In 1823, he married Rachel M. Sexias, daughter of Benjamin Mendes Seixas and a descendant of Isaac Mendes Seixas. Their children were Judith Salzedo (who married David Hays), Sarah (who married Abraham H. Cardozo and was mother to lawyer Michael H. Cardozo), Zipporah (who married Benjamin Sexias), Benjamin F., Moses L. M. (a druggist and veteran of the American Civil War), Raphael (a San Francisco merchant), Sarah, Rebecca, and Miriam.

Peixotto returned to New York City in 1841. He died of consumption there on May 13, 1843.
