= Bridget Peixotto =

American educator

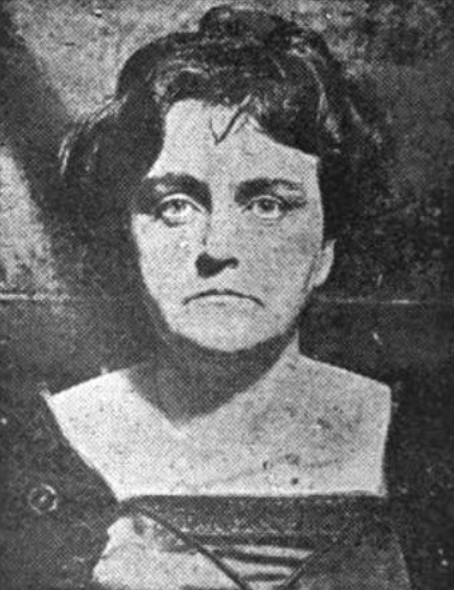
- Peixotto, from a 1914 publication
- Born: Bridget Mary Frances Caulfield; September 5, 1877; Granard, County Longford, Ireland
- Died: April 10, 1972 (aged 94); Washington, D.C., U.S.
- Occupation: Educator

Bridget Mary Frances Caulfield Peixotto (September 5, 1877 – April 10, 1972) was an Irish-born American educator and teachers' union leader in New York. Her 1913 dismissal from her job in the Bronx led to a landmark case on maternity leave for teachers.

== Early life and education ==
Caulfield was born in Granard, County Longford, Ireland, the daughter of Patrick Caulfield and Ellen Watson Kelly Caulfield. She moved to the United States as a young woman.

== Career and legal battle ==
Policies against married women teachers were enforced in many school districts in the early 20th century United States. Protests by Henrietta Rodman and others forced changes in New York City Schools. The inevitable next step for the organized educators of New York City was to address similar laws against women teachers who became mothers.

Bridget C. Peixotto was a teacher at Public School 14 in the Bronx. She was suspended in April 1913 and dismissed in October 1913, for "neglect of duty", because she took time off to give birth. Peixotto's job was reinstated in November 1913, after a ruling by Samuel Seabury of the New York Supreme Court. However, Seabury's ruling was reversed by the appeals court soon after.

Peixotto appealed to the State Commissioner of Education, John Huston Finley in 1914. Finley's decision, issued in January 1915, established the right of women teachers in New York schools to become parents without losing their employment, “for that which is the lawful, natural consequence of marriage and its social sanction.” She was reinstated as a teacher, with back pay. New York's resolution of Peixotto's case made national headlines, and served as a template for maternity leave policies in other states and other industries. By 1930, many other restrictions on the extramural lives of women teachers were challenged, often with reference to the Finley decision.

Peixotto became an assistant principal in 1916, and a school principal in 1918. In the 1920s she was New York state director of the National Education Association (NEA), and she attended the national meeting of the NEA in Minneapolis in 1928. In 1930 she ran for a seat on the Teachers' Retirement Board. She retired from schoolwork in 1948.

== Personal life ==
Caulfield married insurance executive Francis Raphael Peixotto in February 1912. Their daughter Helen, whose April 1913 birth was at the center of the mother-teacher debate, became a psychology professor. Peixotto's husband died in 1928, and she died in 1972, at the age of 93, in Washington, D.C.
