= Clotilde Bressler-Gianoli =

Italian opera singer born in Switzerland

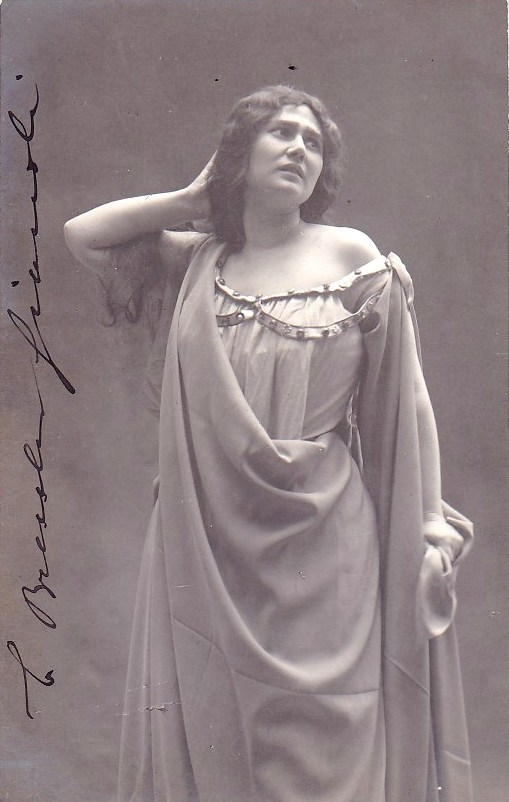
Clotilde Bressler-Gianoli as Brangäne in Wagner's Tristan und Isolde

Clotilde Bressler-Gianoli (June 3, 1875 – May 12, 1912), sometimes seen as Clothilde Bressler-Gianoli, was an Italian opera singer born in Switzerland.

== Early life ==
Clotilde Bressler-Gianoli was born in Geneva in 1875 (some sources give 1874), the daughter of Italian parents. She showed some early talent at piano, and began performing in public at age seven. She trained as a singer at conservatories in Geneva and in Milan.

== Career ==
Gianoli was only 19 years old when she made her professional debut, in Saint-Saëns' Samson et Dalila in Geneva. She was also principal contralto at La Scala, in 1908.

Bressler-Gianoli starred in the title role of Bizet's Carmen in Brussels (1895) and Paris (1900). Her most successful appearance in the role was at the Manhattan Opera House in New York City in 1906 and 1907, giving what The New York Times called "a striking and original performance...[her portrayal has] the allurement of sheer wickedness and all the wiles and treacheries that wickedness suggests". During that run, Bressler-Gianoli was injured on stage, stabbed by Charles Dalmorès with a prop blade that was sharp enough to draw blood. She went on stage with a bandaged arm for the next performance. Also in 1907 at the Manhattan Opera House, she played the title role in Ambroise Thomas's Mignon. As part of the Philadelphia-Chicago Opera Company she appeared in Massenet's Thaïs and Charpentier's Louise with Mary Garden and Dalmorès, both in 1911.

== Personal life ==
Clotilde Bressler-Gianoli was married and had at least one son, Henri, who accompanied her as a little boy in New York. In 1909 she was reportedly losing her sight and spending time in Zürich in pursuit of a cure. She died in 1912, in Geneva, from sepsis after an appendectomy. She was almost 37 years old.
