= Judith Salzedo Peixotto =

Judith Salzedo Peixotto

Judith Salzedo Hays née Peixotto (December 30, 1823 – March 1, 1881) was a Jewish-American teacher and principal from New York.

== Life ==
Peixotto was born on December 30, 1823, in New York City, New York, the daughter of Dr. Daniel Levy Maduro Peixotto and Rachel Sexias. Her father was a Dutch immigrant and physician, and her paternal grandfather Moses Levi Maduro Peixotto was hazan of Shearith Israel. Her siblings included merchant Raphael Peixotto and diplomat Benjamin F. Peixotto.

Following her father's death in 1843, Peixotto began working as a teacher and became the family's main support as the eldest sibling. Her sisters Zipporah and Sarah also worked as teachers, and the three of them were among the first known Jewish women to work as teachers in New York. When New York City first opened evening schools in 1847, she spent the next two years in charge of the Female Evening School in James Street. By 1850, she left the evening school and became one of three principals in the James Street elementary school, making her the first Jewish principal in New York.

In 1852, Peixotto married pharmacist David Solis Hays. She gave up teaching after her marriage. Their children were Sarah Rosalie, Daniel Peixotto, Rebecca Touro, Benjamin Franklin, George Davis, Rachel Peixotto, David Solis Jr., and Cora Florence.

Peixotto died on March 1, 1881. She was buried in Beth Olam Cemetery.
