= Adolphus Solomons =

American 19th century Jewish leader

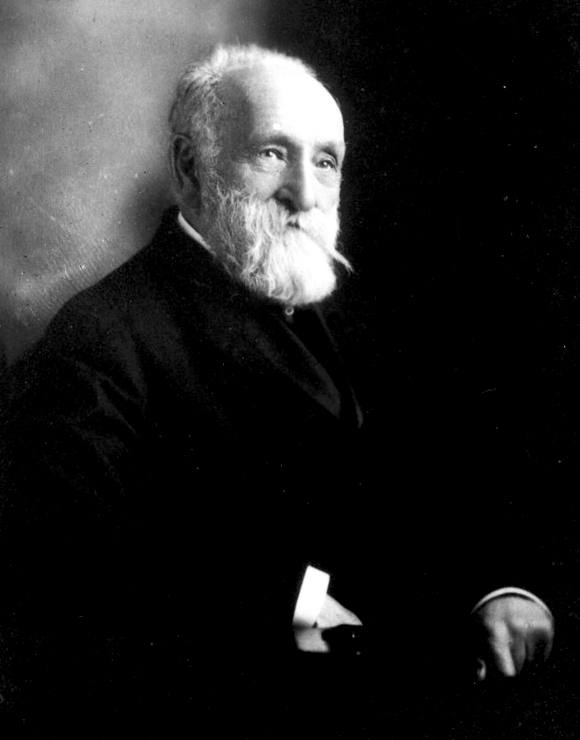
Adolphus Simeon Solomons

Adolphus Simeon Solomons (October 26, 1826 – March 18, 1910) was a Jewish-American philanthropist.

== Life ==
Solomons was born on October 26, 1826, in New York City, New York, the son of John Solomons and Julia Levy. His father was an English immigrant who conducted the New York Courier and Enquirer with James Watson Webb.

Solomons studied at the University of the City of New York. He initially worked for a firm of wholesale importers of stationary and fancy goods. Within two years, he became its head bookkeeper and confidential man. When he was fourteen, he enlisted in the New York National Guard and became a color guard for the Third Regiment Washington Greys.He was promoted to sergeant five years later, and was discharged from service in 1847. In 1851, Secretary of State Daniel Webster appointed him "Special Bearer of Dispatches to Berlin." While working abroad, he visited a Jewish ward in a Frankfurt hospital and became inspired to establish a similar institution in New York. After returning home he became a member of a committee that arranged a ball in Niblo's Garden which raised funds that went to what would become Mt. Sinai Hospital.

In 1859, Solomons moved to Washington, D.C., and established the printing house Philp and Solomons, which held contracts for government printing for many years. In 1871, when the capital had its own government, he became chairman of ways and means committee of the District of Columbia House of Representatives. President Ulysses S. Grant offered to appoint him governor of the District in 1871, but he declined the offer. A leading member of the local Jewish community, he took an active part in every inauguration ceremony between Abraham Lincoln and William Howard Taft. The last portrait ever taken of Lincoln was taken in his shop.

Solomons helped establish the American Red Cross with Clara Barton in 1881. By 1883, he was second vice president, an office he held for twelve years. He was a director of the Columbia Hospital and Living In Asylum for twenty years and a charter member of the Garfield Memorial Hospital and the Providence Hospital. He was also an honorary trustee and general agent of the Baron de Hirsch Fund, central committee member and American treasurer of the Alliance Israélite Universelle, acting president of the Jewish Theological Seminary of America, a charter member of the New York Protectory for Jewish Children, acting president of the Providential Aid Society and Charities of the District of Columbia, a founder and president of the Night Lodging House Association of the District of Columbia, vice-president of the Sanitary Aid Society of New York, vice-president of the New Era Club, and treasurer of the Columbia Street Sewing and Religious Classes. In 1881, President Chester A. Arthur appointed him to represent America in the International Convention of Red Cross Societies in Geneva, Switzerland, and he served as vice-president of the convention.

Solomons was married to Rachel Seixas Phillips. She predeceased him. Their daughter Rosalie married N. Taylor Phillips.

Solomons died at home on March 18, 1910. He was buried in the Spanish and Portuguese Cemetery in New York City.
