= Westchester County Bar Association =

- Formation: February 11, 1896
- Location: White Plains, New York, United States
- Members: 2,200
- President: James K. Landu
- Website: www.wcbany.org

The Westchester County Bar Association, established on February 11, 1896, is a not-for-profit corporation based in White Plains, New York, with a voluntary membership of more than 2,200 lawyers.

== Organization ==
The Association consists of seven Sections and more than sixty Committees, led by a team of Officers and Board of Directors. The current president through May 2019 is Richard S. Vecchio.

== Activities ==
The bar association offers lawyer referrals to the public, and affords lawyers an opportunity to meet and interact with others in their field to enhance their practice. The association offers links to needed services such as court interpreters and online access to legal forms.

The WCBA provides attorney, affiliate, and law student members with opportunities to help shape Westchester's legal community and to maintain the high standards of the legal profession. The society publishes a monthly magazine, and information is available through regular mailings and online. The Westchester Bar Journal is published annually and also available online.

On March 24, 2025, the WCBA signed a statement with other regional bar associations condemning President Donald Trump's orders targeting law firms, arguing that they "violate fundamental principles of our legal system and undermine the right to counsel, the independence of the legal profession, and the rule of law."
