= Josephus Flavius Holloway =

American mechanical engineer

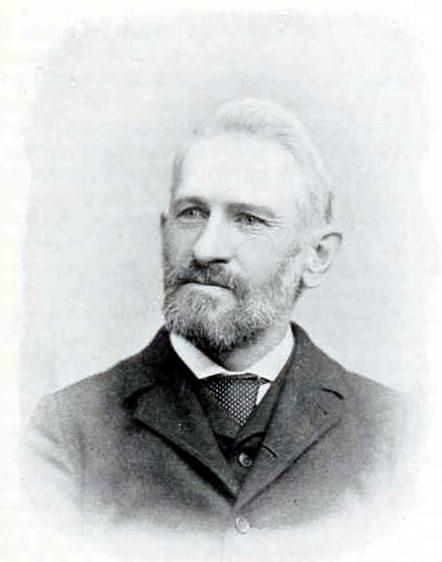
J. F. Holloway, M.E.

Joseph Flavius Holloway (January 18, 1825 – September 1, 1896) was an American mechanical engineer, President of the Cuyahoga Steam Furnace Co., and president of the American Society of Mechanical Engineers in 1885–86.

== Life and work ==
Born at Uniontown, Ohio, Holloway grew up in Sunbury, Pennsylvania, where his father was cabinet maker, and later preacher of the Gospel. He became apprentice at an engine builder and in 1845 was machinist in Chicopee, Massachusetts, for one year. In 1846 he jointed the Cuyahoga Steam Furnace Company, where he assisted in designing steam boats. The next years he designed steam boats for a boat-building firm at Pittsburgh, and at a firm in Wilmington, Delaware.

Early 1850 became manager at the Cumberland Coal and Iron Company, and later at an iron and coal works in Shawneetown, Illinois. In 1857 he returned to the Cuyahoga Steam Furnace Works, where he became superintendent and later also president. After the company merged into the Cleveland Steamboat Company in 1887, Holloway jointed the engineering company H.R. Worthington in New York, and from 1894 to his death in 1896 he was connected with the Snow Steam Pump Works of Buffalo.

He was president of the American Society of Mechanical Engineers in the year 1885–86.

== Publications, a selection ==
- J. F. Holloway, "Fulton nights with the engineers," in: Engineering Magazine. v.2 1891–92 Oct–Mar. pp. 304–10

Patents

- Patent US24558 - Ship s capstan, 1859
- Patent US 28475 - Steam traction-engine, 1860
- Patent US224779 - Compound engine, 1879–80
