= Temple Beth-El (New York City) =

Former Reform synagogue in Manhattan, New York

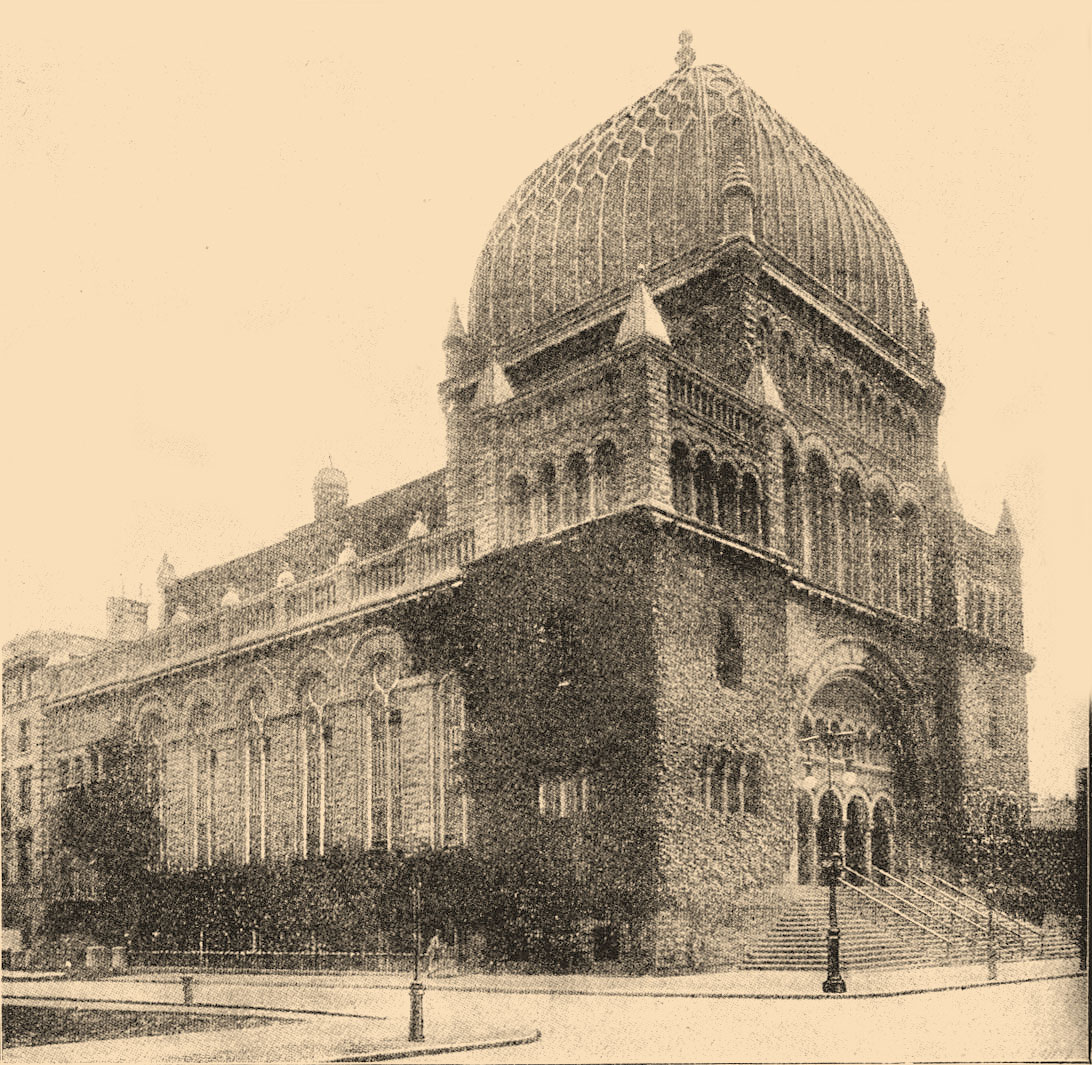
- An illustration of the former synagogue, c. 1900s

- Location of the former synagogue in Manhattan, New York City

Religion
- Affiliation: Reform Judaism (former)
- Ecclesiastical or organisational status: Synagogue (1891–c. 1929)
- Status: Closed; demolished

Location
- Location: 945 Fifth Avenue and 76th Street, Upper East Side, Manhattan, New York City, New York
- Country: United States
- Coordinates: 40°46′30″N 73°57′54″W

Architecture
- Type: Synagogue
- Style: Romanesque Revival
- Established: 1874 (as a congregation)
- Completed: 1891
- Construction cost: $700,000
- Demolished: 1947

Specifications
- Capacity: 2,190 worshippers
- Length: 160 feet (49 m)
- Width: 102 feet (31 m)
- Height (max): 1,200 feet (370 m)
- Dome: One
- Dome height (outer): 140 feet (43 m)
- Dome dia. (outer): 51 feet (16 m)
- Materials: Indiana limestone, Mexican onyx, gold, Numidian marble, copper

Temple Beth-El was a Reform Jewish congregation and synagogue at 945 Fifth Avenue and 76th Street on the Upper East Side of Manhattan in New York City, New York, United States. The synagogue operated between 1891 until c. 1929, and was demolished in 1947. The Temple Beth-El congregation merged with Congregation Emanu-El of New York in 1927.

== History ==
The congregation was formed on March 27, 1874, through the merger of Congregation Anshe Chesed with Temple Adath Jeshurun. David Einhorn served as the congregation's first rabbi. Kaufmann Kohler succeeded his father-in-law Einhorn as rabbi in 1879, serving there until he became president of Hebrew Union College in 1903. Rudolph Grossman was associate rabbi of Temple Beth-El from 1889 to 1896. Samuel Schulman was elected associate rabbi in 1901, and in 1903 he succeeded Kohler as rabbi. He continued to serve as its rabbi until its merger in 1927.

The Romanesque Revival building with Byzantine and Moorish influences, designed by Brunner & Tryon, was dedicated on September 18, 1891. Completed with Indiana limestone, and interior fittings using Mexican onyx, gold, Numidian marble, and a copper-domed roof, the land and building costs amounted to $700,000 in 1891 ($25.1 million in 2025). The large 51-foot (16 m) dome was reportedly modelled on the New Synagogue in Berlin.

An organ by Odell Company was installed in the synagogue in 1890; and it was replaced by a new organ by M. P. Möller, installed in 1924 at the front of the synagogue above the bimah, obscured from public view.

In 1927 the Temple Beth-El congregation merged with Congregation Emanu-El. The congregation had barely used the synagogue since Yom Kippur in 1929, and was subsequently demolished in 1947.

== Gallery ==
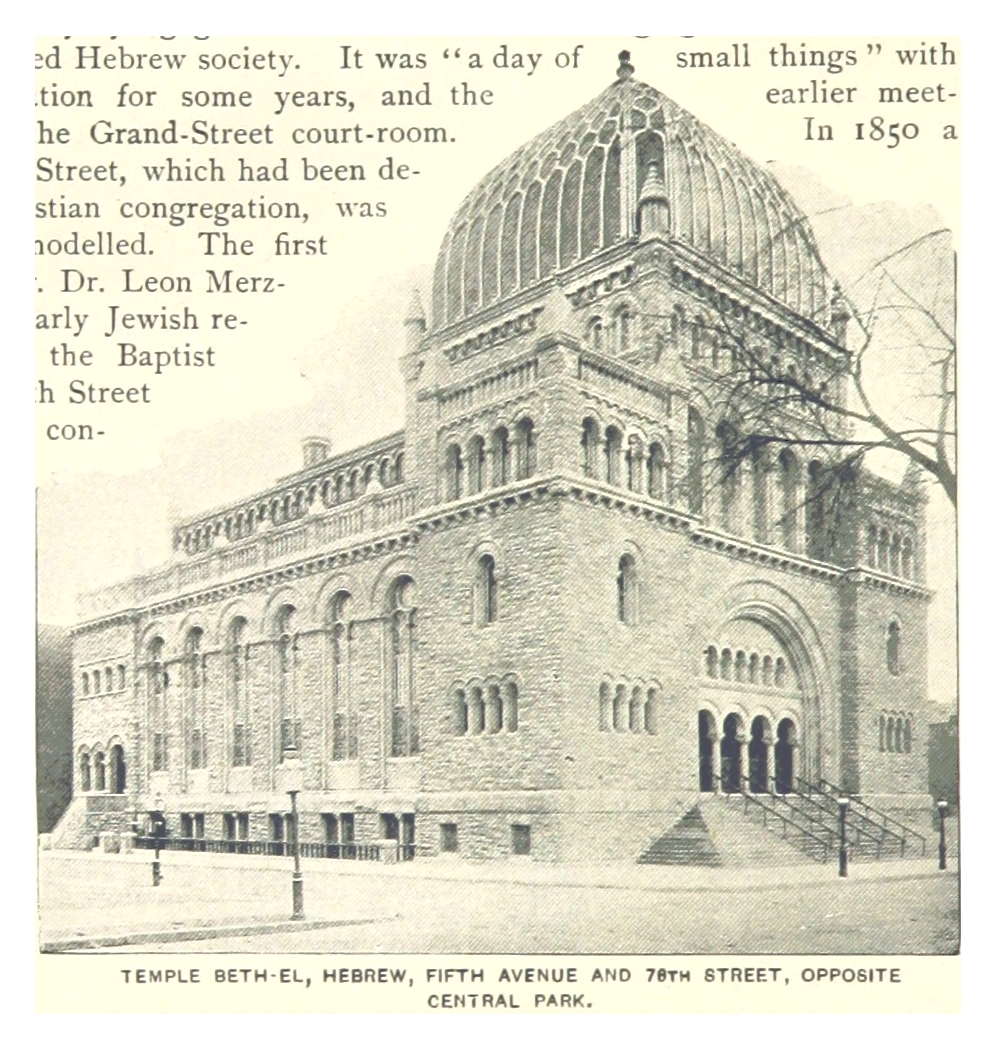

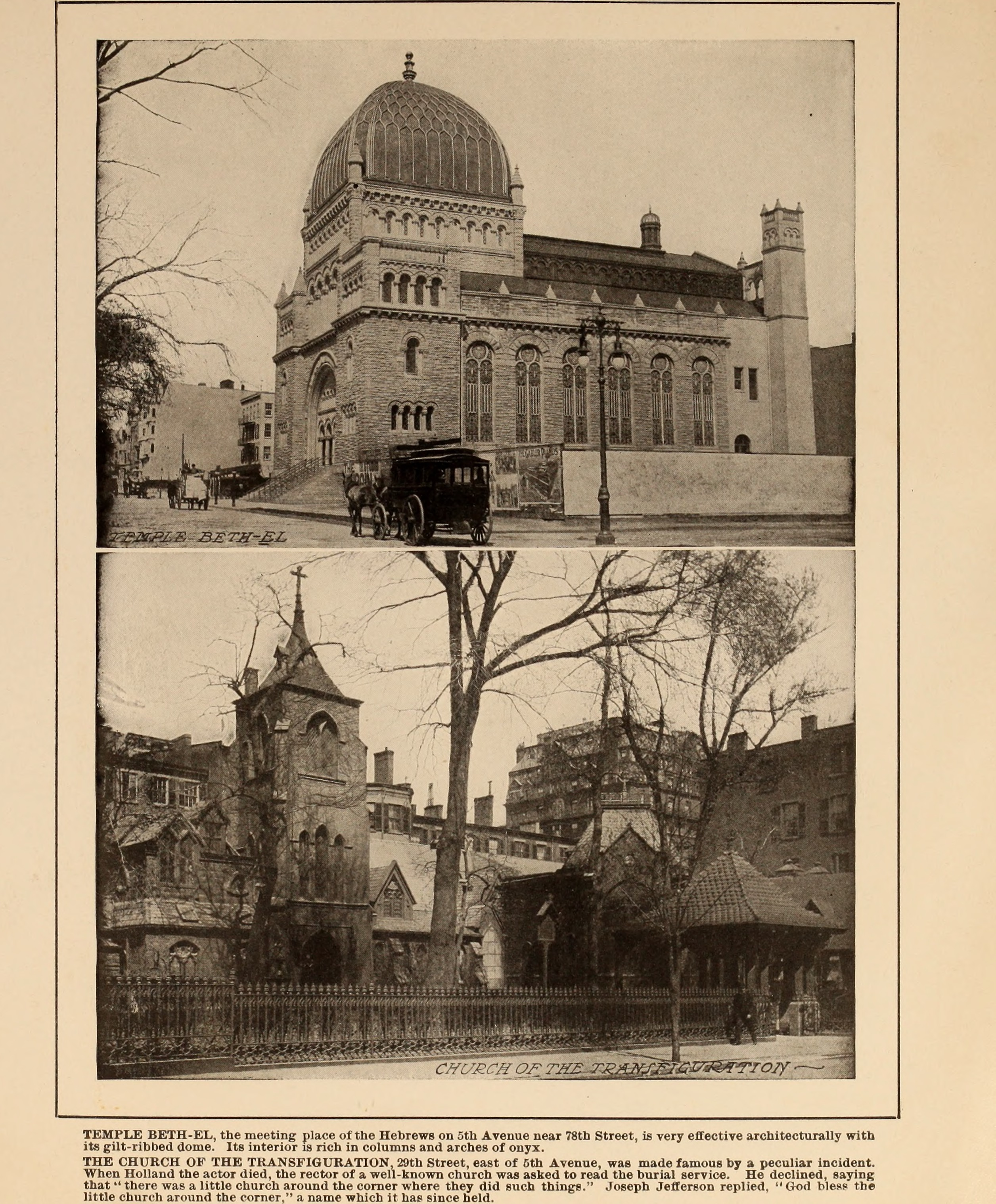
