= Maurice H. Harris =

American rabbi

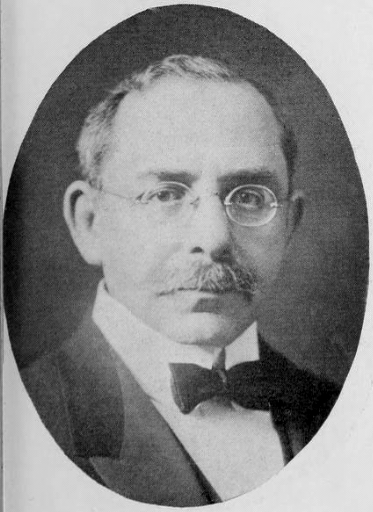
- Born: Maurice Henry Harris; November 9, 1859; London, England
- Died: June 23, 1930 (aged 70); New York, New York, US
- Education: Columbia University
- Occupation: Rabbi
- Spouse: Kitty Green (m. 1888)
- Children: 3

Maurice Henry Harris (November 9, 1859 – June 23, 1930) served as rabbi of Temple Israel of Harlem for almost fifty years.

== Life ==
Harris was born on November 9, 1859, in London, England, the son of Rabbi Henry Lionell Harris and Rachel Lewis. His brother Isidore Harris was the scholarly minister of the Berkeley Street Synagogue in London.

Harris immigrated to America when he was nineteen. He studied in the Emanu-El Theological Seminary in New York City, New York, and was ordained a rabbi by Rabbi Gustav Gottheil in 1884. He also studied in Columbia University, receiving an A.B. from there in 1887, an A.M. in 1888, and a Ph.D. in 1889. In 1882, while studying, he became a Hebrew teacher for a small Orthodox Congregation Hand in Hand of Harlem that met in a room above a store in Harlem. The congregation picked him as their rabbi in 1887. A year later, the congregation, then known as Temple Israel of Harlem, moved to a new location and began using the Jastrow prayer book. By 1907, the congregation was considered one of the leading Reform congregations in New York City, moved to a different location, and became known as Temple Israel. Harris remained the congregation's rabbi for almost fifty years, serving as rabbi until his death.

By 1904, Harris wrote the three-volume The People of the Book: A History and Selected Addresses, two Chautauqua syllabi of Jewish history and literature, and contributions to the Jewish Quarterly Review and the North American Review. He also wrote History of the Medieval Jews in 1924, Modern Jewish History in 1910, 1924, and 1928, Modern Jewish History from the Renaissance to the World War in 1922, The Story of the Jew in 1919, The Story of the Jew in America in 1921, and A Thousand Years of Jewish History in 1927.

Harris was a founder and honorary president of the Federation Settlement, a charter board member of the Jewish Protectory and Prison Aid Society and the Jewish Board of Guardians, a board member of the New York Society for Prevention of Crime, president of the New York Board of Jewish Ministers, and a member of the Central Conference of American Rabbis and the Association of Reform Rabbis. He was also a founder and trustee of the Jewish Institute of Religion. Initially opposed to Zionism, a visit to Palestine in 1921 led him to support Zionism and also led to him organizing an annual campaign among children in Jewish religious schools in America that provided for school lunches for poor Jewish children in Palestine. The campaign was sponsored by Hadassah, and after his death a model experimental station in school dietetics was established in Palestine in his memory.

In 1888, Harris married Kitty Green in London. Their children were Adriel, Naomi Wolfson, and Ruth.

Harris died in Mount Sinai Hospital from a brief illness on June 23, 1930. Over a thousand people attended his funeral in Congregation Emanu-El; Temple Israel was being redecorated at the time and could not be used for the funeral. Rabbi Stephen S. Wise delivered the eulogy. The honorary pallbearers were trustees of Temple Israel and representatives of the Board of Jewish Ministers and the Association of Reform Rabbis (of which Harris was president when he died). The funeral was attended by, among other people, Court of Appeals Judge Irving Lehman, Felix M. Warburg, Federal Judge Julian W. Mack, Rabbi Nathan Krass, Justice Joseph M. Proskauer, and delegations representing the Union of American Hebrew Congregations (led by Benjamin Altheimer and Ludwig Vogelstein), the Federation of Jewish Settlements, and the Sisterhood, Ladies' Auxiliary, Men's Club, and Parents' Association of Temple Israel. He was buried in Temple Israel's Mount Hope Cemetery in Westchester.
