= Kaufmann Kohler =

German-born American Bible scholar, Reform rabbi and theologian (1843-1926)

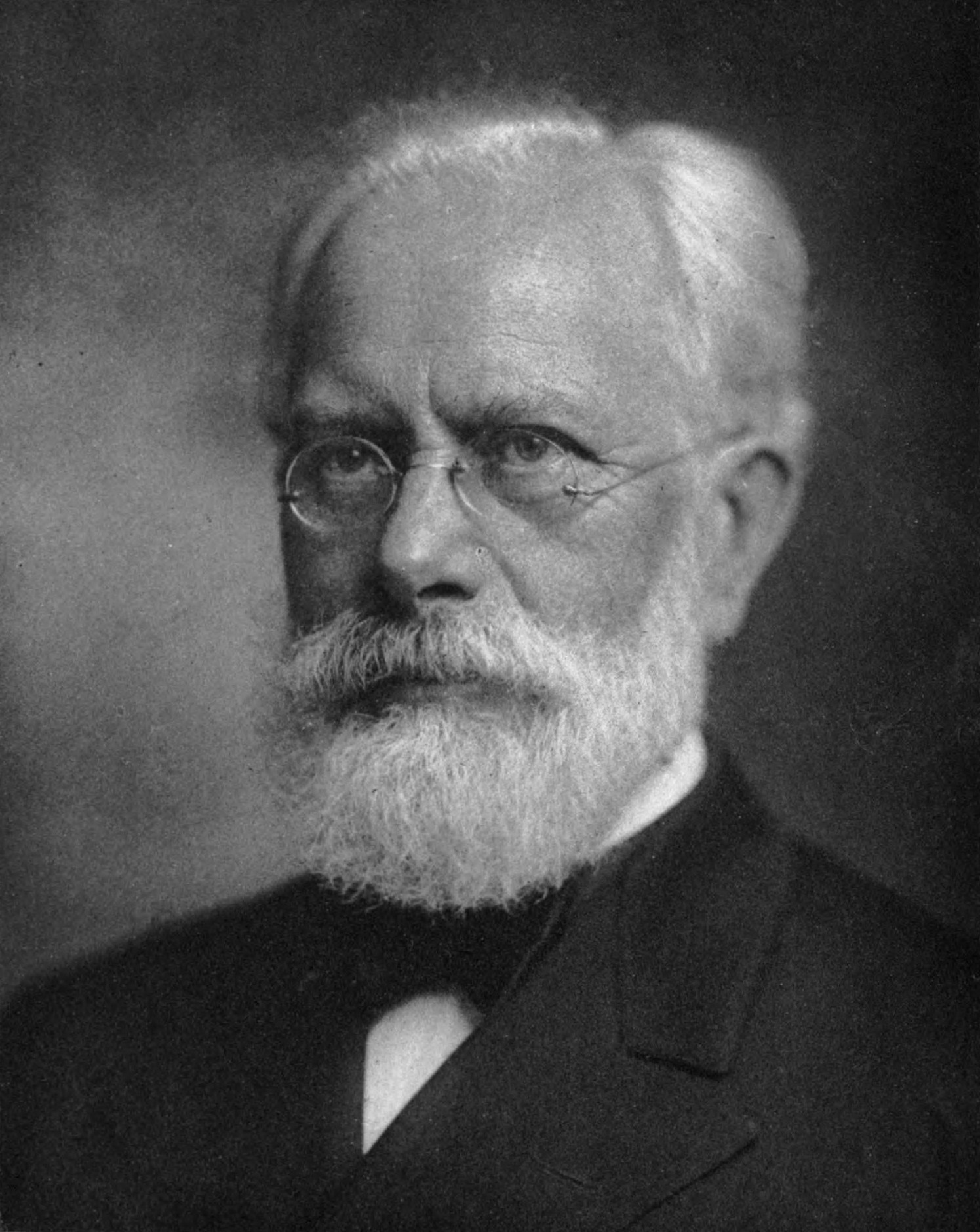

3rd President of Hebrew Union College
- In office February 26, 1903 – 1921
- Preceded by: Moses Mielziner
- Succeeded by: Julian Morgenstern

Personal details
- Born: May 10, 1843 Fürth, Kingdom of Bavaria
- Died: January 28, 1926 (aged 82) New York City, U.S.
- Relatives: Max J. Kohler (son)

Religious life
- Religion: Judaism
- Denomination: Reform movement
- Education: University of Erlangen (PhD)

Kaufmann Kohler (May 10, 1843 – January 28, 1926) was a German-born Jewish-American biblical scholar and critic, theologian, Reform rabbi, and contributing editor to numerous articles in The Jewish Encyclopedia (1906).

== Life and work ==
Kaufmann Kohler was born into a family of German Jewish rabbis in Fürth, Kingdom of Bavaria. He received his rabbinical training at Hassfurt, Höchberg near Würzburg, Mainz, Altona, and at Frankfurt am Main under Samson Raphael Hirsch, and his university training at Munich, Berlin, Leipzig, and Erlangen (Ph.D. 1868). His Ph.D. thesis, Der Segen Jacob's ("Jacob's Blessing"), was one of the earliest Jewish essays in the field of higher criticism, and its radical character had the effect of closing off to him the German synagogal pulpit. Abraham Geiger, to whose Zeitschrift Kohler became a contributor at an early age, strongly influenced his career and directed his steps to the United States. In 1869, he accepted a call to the pulpit of the Temple Beth-El in Detroit, Michigan; in 1871, he became rabbi of Chicago Sinai Congregation. In 1879, he succeeded his father-in-law, David Einhorn, as rabbi of Temple Beth-El in New York City; his brother-in-law, Emil G. Hirsch, became his successor in Chicago. On February 26, 1903, he was elected to the presidency of the Hebrew Union College in Cincinnati, Ohio.

His son was attorney Max J. Kohler.

=== Reform movement ===
From the time of his arrival in the United States, Kohler actively espoused the Reform Judaism movement. He was one of the youngest members of the Philadelphia Jewish Rabbinical Conference of 1869, and in 1885, he convened the Pittsburgh Rabbinical Conference, which adopted the so-called "Pittsburgh Platform" on which Reform Judaism in America still stands. While in Chicago, he introduced Sunday lectures as a supplement to the regular Shabbat service.

Kohler served for many years as president of the New York Board of Ministers and was honorary president of the Central Conference of American Rabbis. He was editor-in-chief of the Sabbath Visito, a Jewish weekly for youth, from 1881 to 1882, and, with I. S. Moses and Emil G. Hirsch, The Jewish Reformer, a weekly devoted to the interests of Reform Judaism, in 1886. He was deeply interested in the Jewish Chautauqua movement. Kohler was a keynote speaker at the 1893 World Parliament of Religions, at which he spoke about "Human Brotherhood as Taught by the Religions Based on the Bible". Shortly before his departure from New York in 1903, he delivered a series of six lectures at the Jewish Theological Seminary on Jewish Apocryphal literature.

Kohler later expressed doubts about the Pittsburgh Platform, stating in 1892:

We ought not be blind to the fact that Reform, with no other principle but that of progress and enlightenment, has created a tendency to treat the past with irreverence and to trifle with the time-honored institutions and venerable sources of Judaism.

He went on to renounce Sunday services, which he had introduced, as "a patricide" undermining the holiness of the Sabbath.

=== Publications ===
Kohler was always an active and prolific contributor to the Jewish and Semitic scientific press, European and American; among the periodicals to which he most frequently contributed scientific articles were Geiger's Zeitschrift, the journal of the German Oriental Society, Hebraica, the Jewish Quarterly Review, the Allgemeine Zeitung des Judenthums, the Jewish Times, the American Hebrew, Menorah Monthly, Zeitgeist, and Unity.

Among his published studies and lectures are:

- "On Capital Punishment" (1869);
- "The Song of Songs" (1877);
- "Backwards or Forwards," a series of lectures on Reform Judaism (1885);
- "Ethical Basis of Judaism" (1887);
- "Church and Synagogue in Their Mutual Relations" (1889);
- "A Guide to Instruction in Judaism" (1899)
- Jewish Theology, Systematically and Historically Considered (1918)
- The Origins of the Synagogue and the Church (1929 — posthumous)

He also edited the German collected writings of David Einhorn (1880). He also wrote important studies of Jesus and Paul.
