= David M. Bressler =

American lawyer

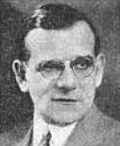
- Born: May 1, 1879; Charlottenburg, Germany
- Died: December 16, 1942 (aged 63); Manhattan, New York, USA
- Education: College of the City of New York; Jewish Theological Seminary of America; New York Law School
- Spouse: Irma Loeb (m. 1907)
- Children: 2

David Maurice Bressler (May 1, 1879 – December 16, 1942) was a German-born Jewish American social worker from New York.

== Early life and education ==
Bressler was born in Charlottenburg, Germany on May 1, 1879, the son of Julius Bressler and Sarah Rothenberg. Bressler immigrated to America in 1884. He attended the College of the City of New York, the Jewish Theological Seminary of America, and the New York Law School.

== Career ==
He was admitted to the bar in 1901, although he then began working in social welfare and in that same year he became director of the Roumanian Relief Committee, which was organized to help Romanian immigrants. When the Committee later merged with the Industrial Removal Office, he served as the Office's manager until 1917. He was honorary secretary of the Jewish Immigrants Information Bureau early in his career, and in 1910 he was on a committee for the reform of immigration conditions at Ellis Island. In 1914, he was president of the National Conference of Jewish Social Workers. He helped organize the first national campaign of the American Jewish Relief Committee in 1915, and became the first secretary of the Joint Distribution Committee. The Committee sent him to study the Jewish conditions in Europe in 1922, and upon his return he became chairman of the National Appeal for Jewish War Sufferers. In 1924, he became chairman of the Emergency Committee for Jewish Refugees with Louis Marshall and Stephen S. Wise, and two years later he was acting chairman of the New York branch of the United Jewish Campaign. He took a second trip to Eastern Europe in 1929, after which he became national co-chairman of the Allied Jewish Campaign. In 1934, Governor Herbert H. Lehman appointed him a member of the New York State Planning Board. In 1937, Lehman appointed him to the New York State Appeal Board of Unemployment Insurance.

Bressler lived in New York City. He was secretary of the Executive Committee of the Independent Order of B'nai B'rith in 1903. He became an executive committee member of the American Jewish Committee in 1925. He was chairman of the advisory board of the Beth Abraham Home for Incurables in 1926. He was a director of the Sydenham Hospital, a delegate-at-large of the Federation for Support of Jewish Philanthropic Societies of New York, a board member of the Union of American Hebrew Congregations, the Palestine Economic Corporation, and the National Refugee Service, an executive committee member of the Joint Distribution Committee, and a non-Zionist member of the Council of the Jewish Agency in Palestine. He also published Industrial Removal Office in 1903, The Distribution of Jewish Immigrants in 1907, and Reports on Present-Day Conditions of the Jews in Eastern Europe in 1930.

== Personal life ==
Bressler was a member of the Freemasons. In 1907, he married Irma Loeb. Their children were Lorna D. Brett and Alan David.

Bressler died at his office on 75 Maiden Lane from a heart attack on December 16, 1942. His funeral took place in Temple Emanu-El in New York. Rabbi Samuel H. Goldenson delivered the eulogy. The honorary pallbearers included Paul Baerwald, Dr. Jacob Billikopf, Dr. Gabriel Davidson, Eugene G. Dreyer, Rabbi Isidore Frank, Dr. Ephraim Frisch, Lawrence Greenbaum, Dr. Maurice B. Hexter, Alexander Kahn, David Brown, Dr. David J. Kaliski, Dr. David Lvovich, James Marshall, Dr. Fred J. Newman, Louis S. Posner, James N. Rosenberg, William Rosenwald, Morton Stein, Horace Stern, Lionel Strassburger, Morris D. Waldman, Truly Warner, Dr. Jacob Golub, Supreme Court Justice Meier Steinbrink, I. Edwin Goldwasser, and Joseph C. Hyman. Former Governor Herbert H. Lehman was supposed to be head the honorary pallbearers, but he was unable to attend the funeral.
