= Ernest Peixotto =

American artist and writer (1869–1940)

Ernest Clifford Peixotto
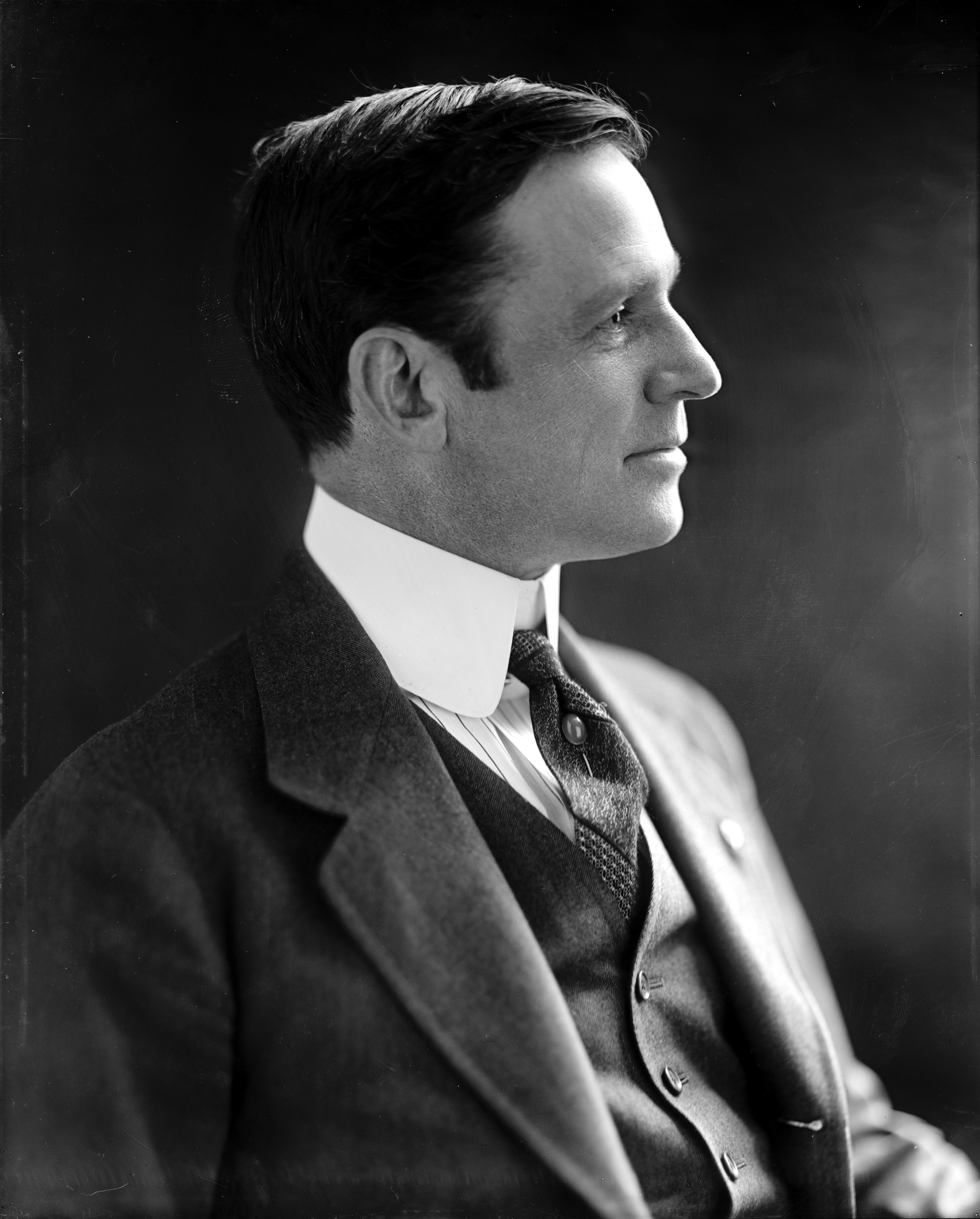
- Peixotto, c. 1915
- Born: October 15, 1869; San Francisco, California, US
- Died: December 6, 1940 (aged 71); New York City, US
- Education: Mark Hopkins Institute of Art, Académie Julian
- Known for: Murals
- Spouse: Mary Glascock Hutchinson (m. 1897)

Ernest Clifford Peixotto (October 15, 1869 – December 6, 1940) was an American artist, illustrator, and author. Although he was known mainly for his murals and his travel literature, his artwork also regularly appeared in Scribner's Magazine. His 1916 work Our Hispanic Southwest is famous for including the first written appearance of the ethnic slur "spic" (although, in fact, it had previously appeared with a different spelling and pronunciation).

== Biography ==
Born on October 15, 1869, in San Francisco, California, Peixotto was one of five children in a Sephardic Jewish family: his sister was Jessica Blanche Peixotto. He studied art at the Mark Hopkins Institute of Art with Emil Carlsen, who encouraged him to go to Paris. Taking his advice, Peixotto went to France in 1888 and studied at the Académie Julian under the tutelage of Jean-Joseph Benjamin-Constant, Henri Lucien Doucet and Jules Joseph Lefebvre. While in France, he visited the colony of the American Impressionists and befriended Theodore Robinson. He spent a total of six years in France, returning to San Francisco in 1894. The following year, he moved to New York City, and joined the staff of Scribner's Magazine.

In 1897, he married the painter Mary Glascock Hutchinson in New Orleans. Two years later the couple returned to France on a sketching trip for Scribner's and ended up staying for six years based in Fontainebleau, outside Paris. During this period, Peixotto illustrated Theodore Roosevelt's Life of Oliver Cromwell (1904). Although he frequently returned to the United States to work, the house in Fontainebleau served as his primary residence for the remainder of his life.

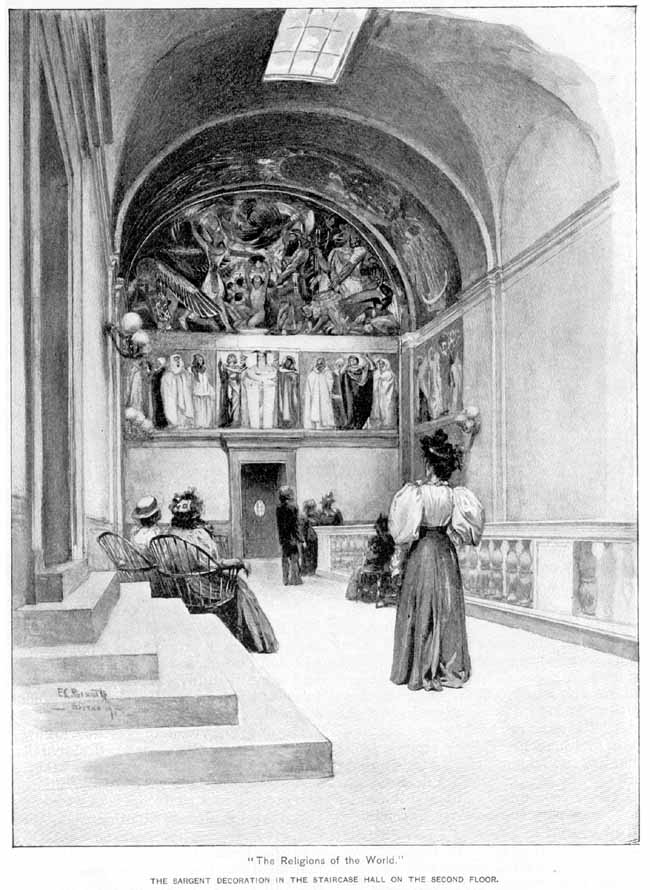
Peixotto's illustration of John Singer Sargent's mural "Triumph of Religion", Boston Public Library, 1896.

In the spring and summer of 1907 he sketched at the art colonies in Berkeley, California and in Carmel-by-the-Sea, California, where he exhibited his work at the Annual of the local Arts & Crafts Club. That year he also had a conspicuous presence in the community of San Francisco artists, associating with Charles Dickman at the Bohemian Club Grove and with Will Sparks and Maynard Dixon at the Sequoia Club. That fall he was teaching at the Art Institute of Chicago, where Thomas Hart Benton was his student. After having been elected to the National Academy of Design in 1909, Peixotto's first large commissioned mural was Le Morte d'Arthur for a private library for railroader Henry A. Everett (not, as widely repeated, at the Cleveland Public Library) in 1911. Subsequently, the majority of his work was in mural form, most of it for private individuals.

During World War I, Peixotto served as a captain in the United States Army Corps of Engineers, director of the Section of Painting, and one of eight official artists attached to the American Expeditionary Force, whose job was to create a visual record of events. After the war, he remained in France as director of the United States Army's art-training center, which merged into the École des Beaux-Arts in 1923. Peixotto remained as the chair of the school's American Committee, while simultaneously serving as the director of the mural department of the Beaux-Arts Institute of Design in New York, a position he held from 1919 through 1926, when he left to focus on his own work. In June 1921 he was made a Chevalier in the Légion d'honneur, for war work and the promotion of friendship between France and the United States.

However, he still served on a number of art organizations. He was the president of the National Society of Mural Painters from 1929 to 1935, and president of School Art League of New York from 1936 to 1940. From 1935 to 1940 he served on the Art Commission of New York City and was director of murals for the 1939 New York World's Fair.

Peixotto died on December 6, 1940.

== Bibliography ==
- Tales of Languedoc (1896)
- Philadelphia: The Place and the People (1898)
- The Story of Old Fort Loudon (1899)
- By Italian Seas (1906)
- Through the French Provinces (1909)
- Romantic California (1910)
- Pacific Shores from Panama (1913)
- Our Hispanic Southwest (1916)
- A Revolutionary Pilgrimage: Being an Account of a Series of Visits to Battlegrounds & Other Places Made Memorable by the War of the Revolution (1917)
- The American Front (1919)
- Through Spain and Portugal (1922)
- Wanderings (1925)

Source: Ernest Peixotto in libraries (WorldCat catalog)
