= The American Hebrew =

Defunct Jewish magazine

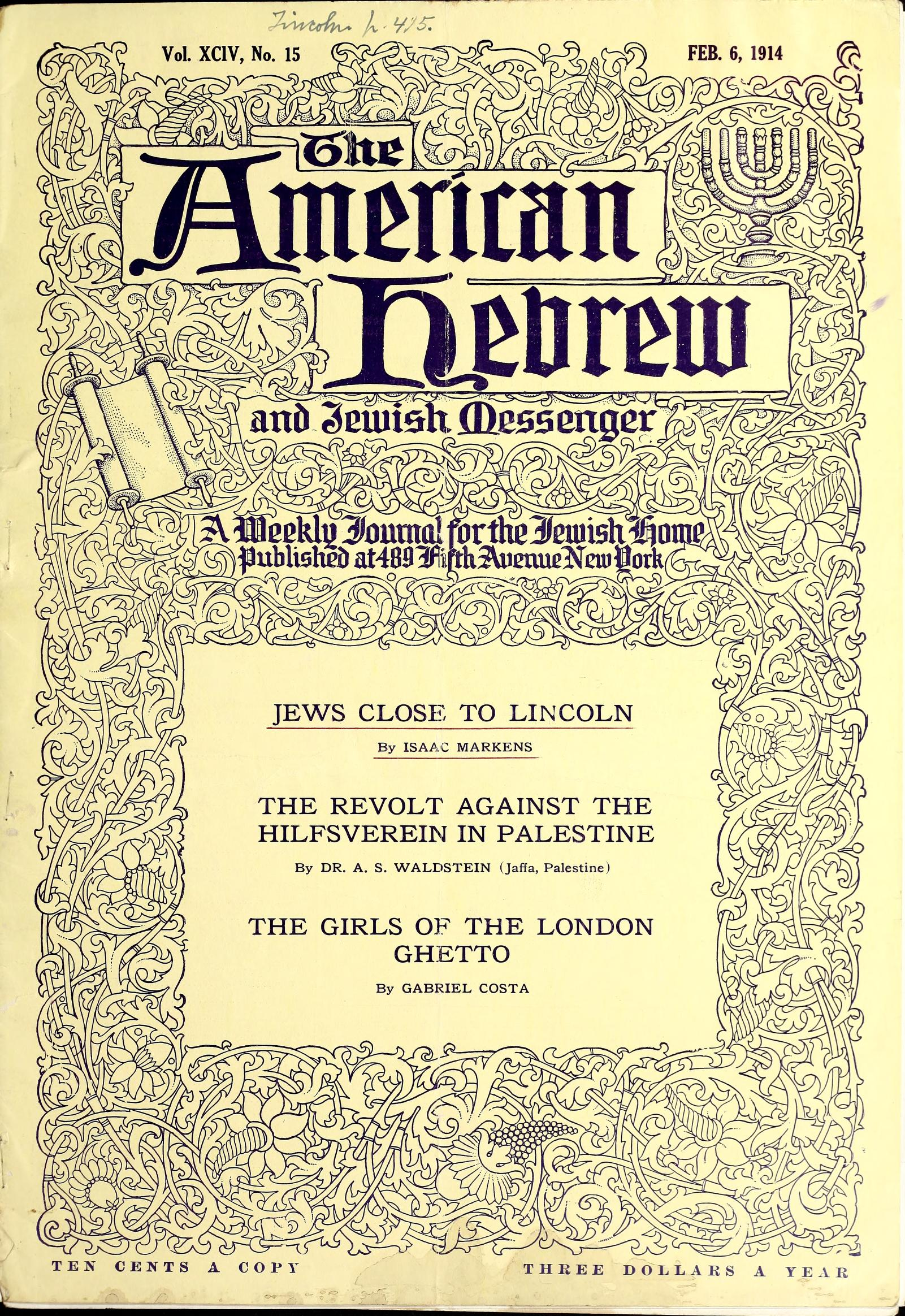
- February 6, 1914 issue
- Publisher: Philip Cowen
- First issue: November 21, 1879
- Country: United States
- Language: English
- OCLC: 12064549

The American Hebrew was a weekly Jewish magazine published in New York City.

== History ==
It began publication on November 21, 1879, in New York City. It was founded by Frederick de Sola Mendes and its publisher was Philip Cowen. The weekly's publisher was the American Hebrew Publishing Company.

Its third issue declared its policy: "It is not controlled by one person, nor is it inspired by one. Its editorial staff comprises men of diverse shades of opinion on ritualistic matters in Judaism, but men who are determined to combine their energies for the common cause of Judaism." To maintain impersonality pertaining to the paper, the names of board members were never published. The turn-of-the-century Jewish Encyclopedia also says that, "Editorially, The American Hebrew stands for conservatism in Judaism. Nevertheless, the columns of this journal are ever open to the discussion of views with which it can in no way accord, but which may be of interest to its readers. Nearly all the prominent Jewish writers and communal workers in the United States have been contributors to its pages."

From the time of its founding, The American Hebrew covered many topics of intense Jewish interest internationally. It covered the persecutions of Romanian Jews that followed the signing of the Treaty of Berlin in 1878 and published a number of important letters on the subject from European writers, which led the American Jews to exercise their influence on behalf of their suffering coreligionists abroad. The periodical covered the persecution of the Russian Jews following the May Laws in 1881. The paper reported on the large influx of Jewish immigrants that followed these latter events, and which significantly changed the demographics of Jewish-Americans; it also covered the rise of institutions to deal with this influx, including the Hebrew Immigrant Aid Society and the Hebrew Technical Institute for their modern education.

In literary terms, The American Hebrew also introduced leading figures in Jewish life, including the writing career of poet Emma Lazarus, who was covered extensively at the time of her death in 1887; she later became famous for her sonnet "The New Colossus", which was inscribed on the base of the Statue of Liberty in 1912.

Music writer David Ewen was on the staff of The American Hebrew in 1935.

== Timeline ==
By the twentieth century, The American Hebrew had absorbed several other regional and religious Jewish periodicals, including The Jewish Chronicle of Baltimore, Maryland, in 1880; The Jewish Reformer, a weekly journal published for a time by Kaufmann Kohler, I. S. Moses, and Emil G. Hirsch, in 1886, and Jewish Tidings of Rochester, New York, in 1895.

Over the years, the journal experienced a number of mergers and changes of name.

- The English language Jewish weekly first appeared as The American Hebrew from November 21, 1879, to December 26, 1902.
- After merging with The Jewish Messenger, it next appeared as The American Hebrew & Jewish Messenger from January 2, 1903, to April 21, 1922.
- It then reappeared as The American Hebrew between April 28, 1922, and January 29, 1932.
- After merging with the New York Jewish Tribune, it appeared as American Hebrew and Jewish Tribune from February 5, 1932, to October 24, 1935.
- It again reappeared as The American Hebrew between November 1, 1935, and September 14, 1956.
- Following its merger with the Brooklyn publication The Examiner, it dropped its specifically Jewish title and was renamed the American Examiner; it continued publishing from September 20, 1956, to October 15, 1970.
- Following its merger in 1970 with the Washington, D.C. publication The Jewish Week, it was renamed The Jewish Week and the American Examiner; in 1975 it was renamed the Jewish Week; and in 1983 it became the Washington Jewish Week.

== See also ==
- Bernard G Richards
