= Temple Israel of the City of New York =

Reform synagogue in Manhattan, New York

Temple Israel
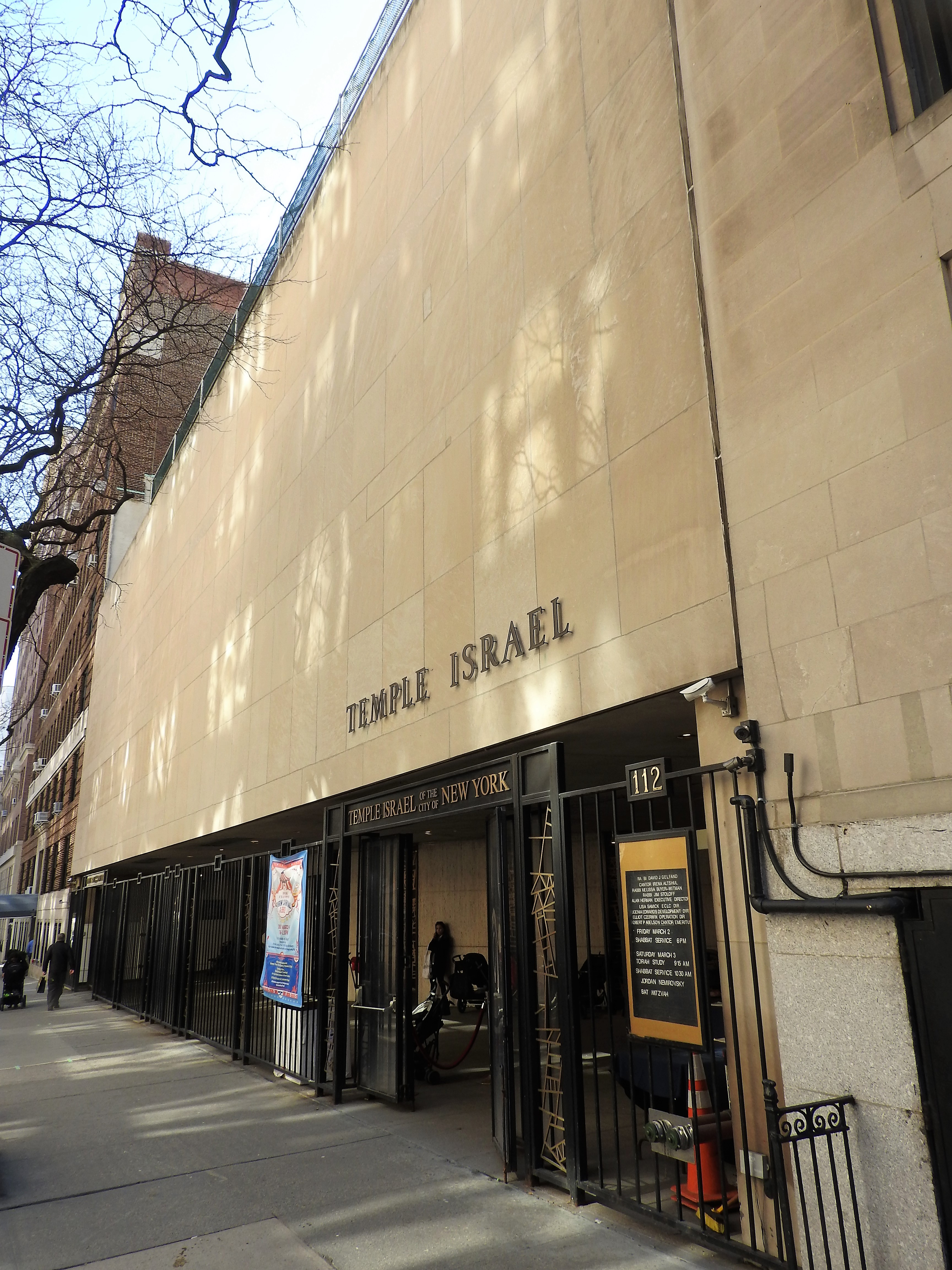
- Temple Israel 1967 building, in 2018

- Location of the current synagogue on the Upper East Side of Manhattan, New York City

Religion
- Affiliation: Reform Judaism
- Ecclesiastical or organisational status: Synagogue
- Leadership: Rabbi David J. Gelfand; Rabbi Melissa Buyer Whitman
- Status: Active

Location
- Location: 112 East 75th Street, Upper East Side, Manhattan, New York City, New York
- Country: United States
- Coordinates: 40°46′21″N 73°57′42″W

Architecture
- Architects: John W. Welch (Fifth Avenue); Arnold Brunner (Lenox Street); William Tachau (West 91st Street); Peter Claman (East 75th); (Schuman & Lichtenstein)
- Type: Synagogue
- Style: Brutalist (East 75th)
- Established: 1873 (as a congregation)
- Completed: 1887 (Fifth Avenue); 1907 (Lenox Avenue); 1920 (West 91st Street); 1967 (East 75th Street)

Website
- tinyc.org
- Temple Israel of the City of New York (Young Israel of the West Side)
- U.S. National Register of Historic Places
- New York State Register of Historic Places
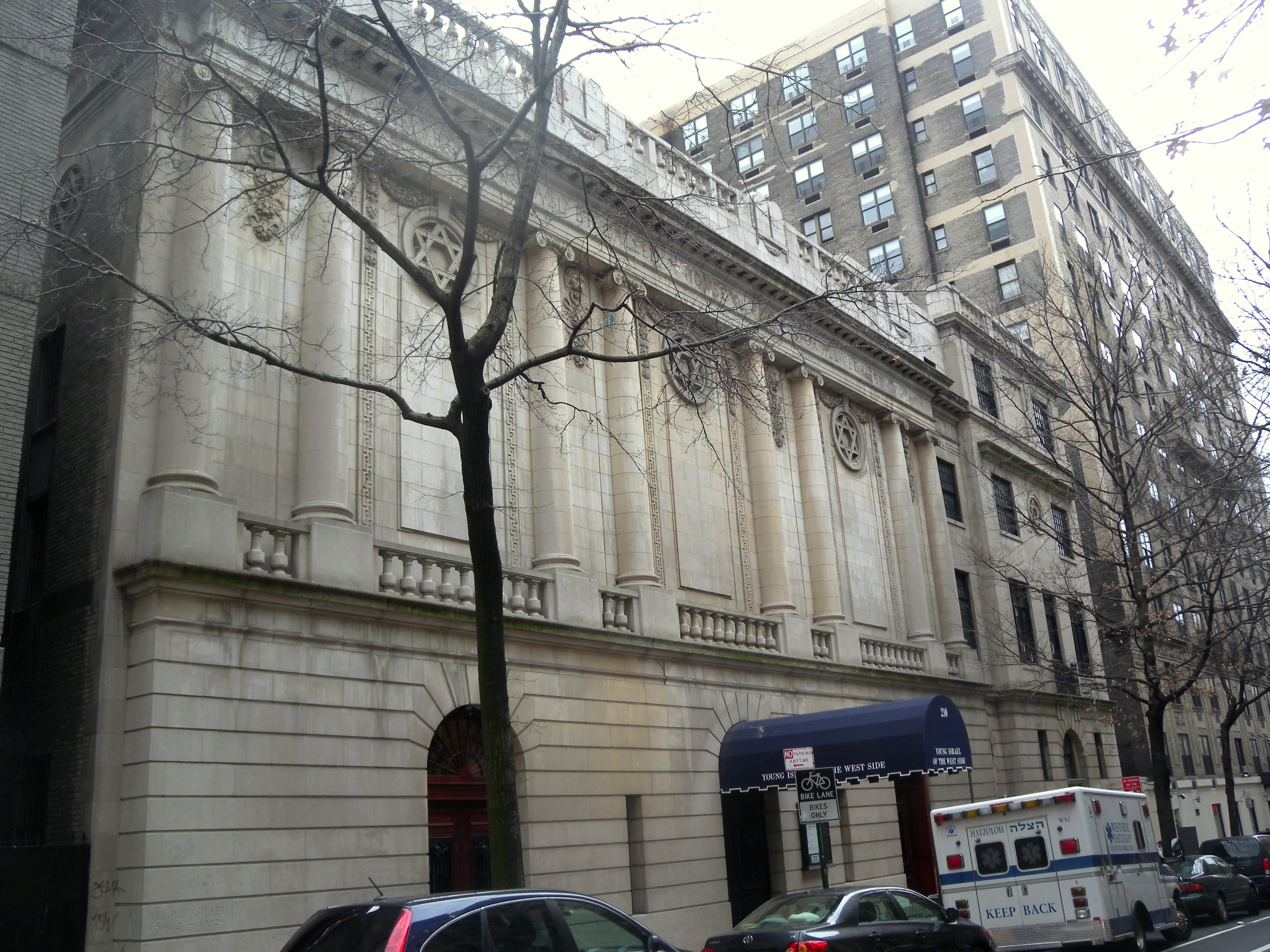
- The former synagogue, now Young Israel of the West Side, at 210 West 91st Street

- Location within Manhattan
- Location: 210 West 91st Street, Upper West Side, Manhattan
- Coordinates: 40°47′27″N 73°58′24″W
- Area: 0.32 acres (1,300 m^{2})
- Built: 1920
- Architect: William Tachau
- Architectural style: Neoclassical
- NRHP reference No.: 100009191
- NYSRHP No.: 06101.001452

Significant dates
- Added to NRHP: August 4, 2023
- Designated NYSRHP: March 9, 2023

Temple Israel of the City of New York is a Reform Jewish congregation and synagogue located at 112 East 75th Street, on the Upper East Side of Manhattan in New York City, New York, United States. The congregation was incorporated by German Jews in 1873.

It purchased its first synagogue building at Fifth Avenue and 125th Street in 1887, constructed its own at 201 Lenox Avenue and 120th Street in 1907, and constructed another at 210 West 91st Street in 1920. Its current Brutalist-style building, at 112 East 75th Street was completed in 1967.

Since its founding, Temple Israel has been served by only five senior rabbis: Maurice H. Harris (1882–1930), William Rosenblum (1930–1963), Martin Zion (1963–1991), Judith Lewis (1991–2006), and David Gelfand since 2006.

== Early history ==
Temple Israel was incorporated in 1873 as Yod b'Yod ("Hand in Hand") congregation (formally Congregation Hand in Hand of Harlem), the first synagogue in Harlem. The founders were German Jews, typically shopkeepers, traditionally observant, and first worshiped above a printing shop on East 125th Street in Harlem. An early trustee was Cyrus L. Sulzberger, father of New York Times publisher Arthur Hays Sulzberger. They soon established a Hebrew school called "Gates of Learning" for the 45 children of the congregation. The congregation rented a larger space on 124th Street in 1874, and in 1876 leased a former church on 116th Street, between First Avenue and Second Avenue. In 1880, the congregation purchased the building on 116th Street.

Temple Israel was initially lay-led, but in 1882 appointed Maurice H. Harris as the congregation's rabbi; at the time, he was still a student at Columbia College, Columbia University and Emanu-El Theological Seminary. That year, the congregation changed its name to Temple Israel of Harlem (though the name change wasn't formally legalized until 1894). In 1884, Harris' installation was made official.

== First buildings ==
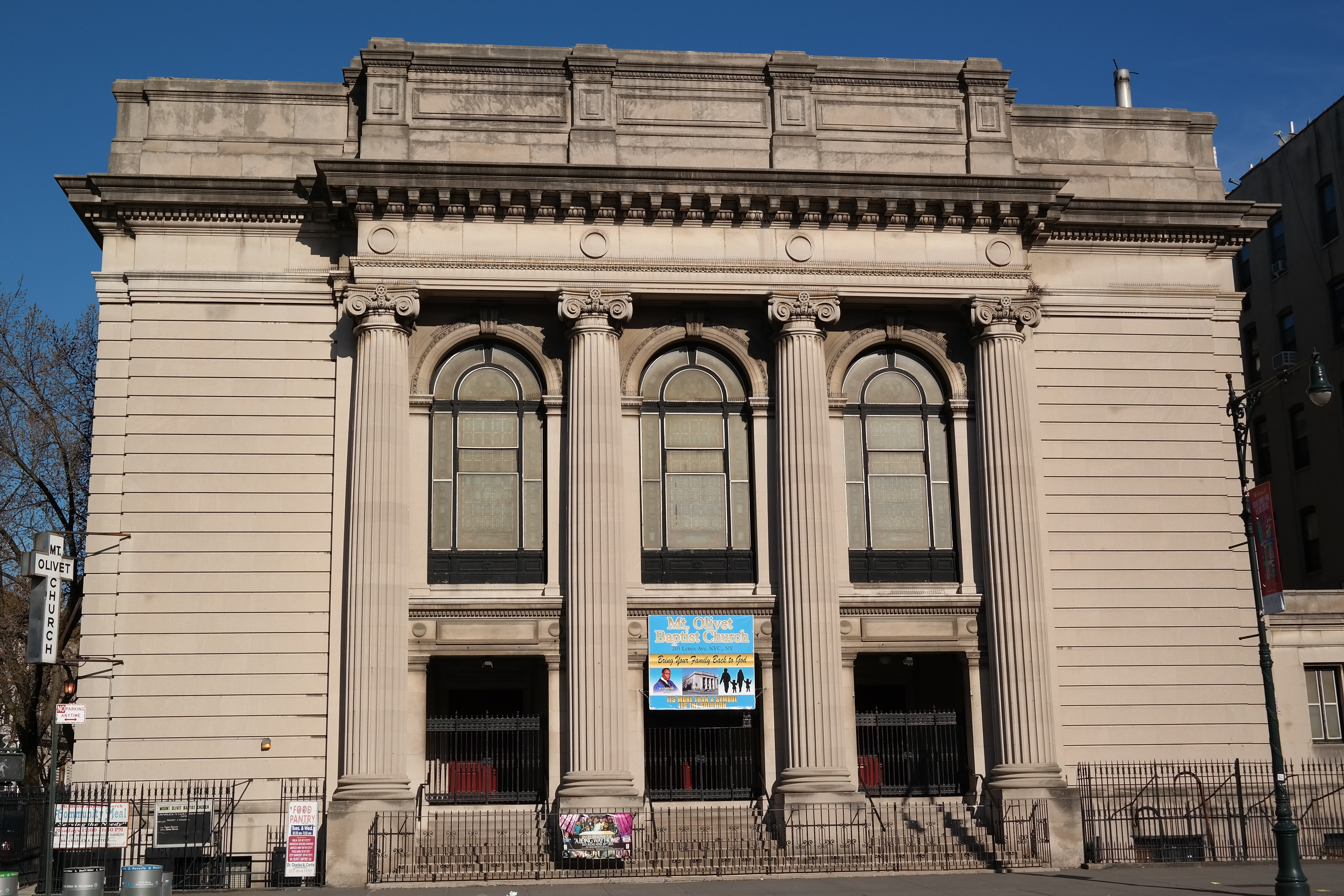
201 Lenox Avenue

In 1887, the congregation purchased a building at Fifth Avenue and 125th Street, and the following year re-dedicated it as their synagogue. Designed by John W. Welch, the building had been formerly owned by the Holy Trinity Church, and was constructed in 1869–1870. In 1888 the congregation also re-organized, changing its name to Temple Israel of Harlem. In 1898, the congregation celebrated its 25-year anniversary and 10 years in its current home.

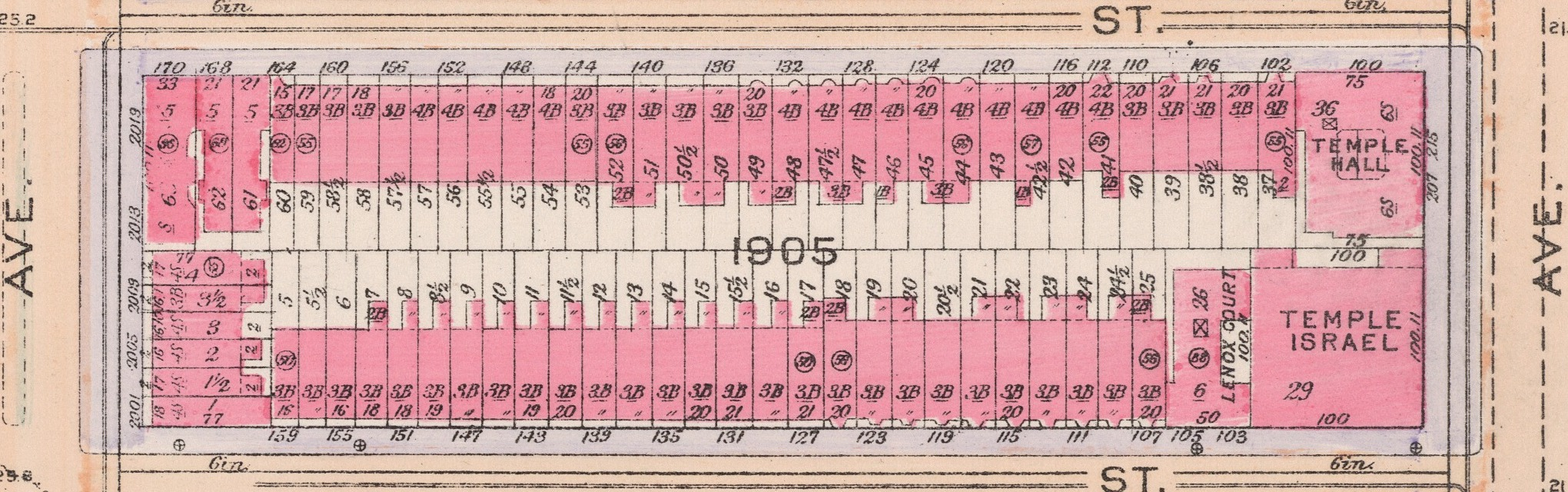
"TEMPLE ISRAEL" and "TEMPLE HALL" on Lenox Avenue map in 1916

The congregation constructed its own synagogue building at 201 Lenox Avenue, at 120th Street, in 1907. The limestone building was not designed in the typical Moorish Revival style of other synagogues of the time; the designer, Arnold Brunner, argued that "synagogues have no traditional lines of architectural expression". According to David W. Dunlap, the building "looks like a Roman temple until you notice the Stars of David in the column capitals, fanlights, and spandrel panels", and "may rank as the single best Neoclassical synagogue in Manhattan". Temple Israel joined the Union of American Hebrew Congregations (now Union for Reform Judaism) in 1909, and a few years later merged with Shaarey Borocho (or Shaaray Beracha), a synagogue of Alsatian Jews.

During World War I, the loyalties of the still mostly German-Jewish members were, at first, divided between the Central Powers and the Allied Powers, though Harris supported the Allies.

== Moves to West 91st Street and East 75th Street ==
In 1920, the members moved to a new Neoclassical building at 210 West 91st Street, designed by William Tachau; the old building on Lenox Avenue was sold to the Seventh-Day Adventist Temple, which in turn sold it in 1925 to the Mount Olivet Baptist Church. Temple Israel elected its first woman trustee in 1921, dedicated its new building in 1922, and in 1924 officially changed its name to Temple Israel of the City of New York. By 1929, membership exceeded 950.

William Franklin Rosenblum succeeded Harris as Temple Israel's second rabbi in 1930, and Harris died just a few months later that year. The congregation was active during the Great Depression, and supported Jewish education programs for poor children of the neighborhood. Temple Israel actively supported the war effort during World War II, and afterward Rosenblum opposed the creation of Israel, though he would later become a supporter of the country.

Rosenblum retired in 1963, and Martin Zion succeeded him that year as Temple Israel's third rabbi. At the time, the congregation's trustees had decided to relocate the synagogue from the Upper West Side to the Upper East Side of Manhattan, and in 1964 began construction of a new building at Temple Israel's current location, 112 East 75th Street. Designed by architect Peter Claman of Schuman & Lichtenstein, the Brutalist structure was completed in 1967. The previous building on West 91st Street was sold to the Young Israel of the West Side congregation, who still occupy it. The 1920 building was listed on the National Register of Historic Places in 2023.

== Events since 1980 ==
Robert Abelson became leader of the congregation's music program in 1980. In 1985, Judith Lewis became Temple Israel's Director of Education, and in 1991 she succeeded Zion as the synagogue's fourth senior rabbi. By 1995, membership was over four hundred families.

In 2006 David Gelfand succeeded Lewis, becoming Temple Israel's fifth Senior Rabbi in 2006, after an acrimonious departure from the Jewish Center of the Hamptons. Gelfand had previously served as rabbi in Temple Beth-El in Great Neck, New York; Har Sinai Temple in Pennington, New Jersey; and the Fairmount Temple in Beachwood, Ohio. He helped found and served as a national officer of the Interfaith Alliance, and is a member of the National Council of the American Israel Public Affairs Committee.

Irena Altshul joined Temple Israel in 2003, left in 2006, and rejoined as cantor in 2013. Melissa Buyer-Wittman joined the synagogue as Director of Lifelong Learning in 2011, and David Reinhart became Assistant Rabbi in 2019.

In 2022 the congregation launched a $40 million capital campaign to undertake major renovations to the main sanctuary, expansion of the chapel and courtyard enclosure, enhancements to the building's upper levels, and updates to the ballroom. $28 million had been pledged by major benefactors at the time of the launch.

== See also ==
- List of synagogues named Temple Israel
