= Liberal Zionism =

Political ideology of Zionism with liberal values

Liberal Zionism (Hebrew: ציונות ליברלית, romanized: tsiyonut libralit) is a type of Zionism associated with liberal values, often with an idea of maintaining Israel as a Jewish and democratic state. In addition, supporters usually advocate for secularism, liberal democracy, free market principles and adherence to human rights and often support for the two-state solution.

Liberal Zionism originated from the original ideology of Theodor Herzl and Ahad Ha'am and is marked by a concern for democratic values and human rights, freedom to criticize government policies without accusations of disloyalty, and rejection of excessive religious influence in public life. Liberal Zionists see that "Jewish history shows that Jews need and are entitled to a nation-state of their own. But they also think that this state must be a liberal democracy, which means that there must be strict equality before the law independent of religion, ethnicity or gender."

Currently, the main parties that hold Liberal Zionist views include Yesh Atid, Blue and White, and Yashar. Since 2023, many Liberal Zionists have participated in judicial reform protests to oppose what they view as democratic backsliding under prime minister Benjamin Netanyahu's government. Yair Lapid, leader of Yesh Atid who briefly served as prime minister, regularly spoke critically of Netanyahu and of religious coercion.

== History ==
=== Early Zionist activism ===
Liberal Zionism has its origins in both the Cultural Zionism of Ahad Ha'am and the Political Zionism of Theodor Herzl and Max Nordau. Ha'am argued for the creation of a Jewish homeland where Jews and Arabs would live as equal citizens and where Hebrew would become the main language, only calling for a Jewish state once the region had become culturally Jewish. Herzl, in his book Der Judenstaat, called for the immediate creation of a binational Jewish state. His secondary work Altneuland outlined a vision for a binational, German-speaking, Westernized Jewish state, undermining Jewish historical memory, traditional Arab culture, and Jewish supremacism. Both of these visions, while radically different in their desired outcomes, shared a similar commitment to racial equality through binationalism, liberal democracy, secularism, individualism, and capitalism. Notably, the two men differed on the issue of imperialism. Herzl, who was an assimilated Jew of the Austro-Hungarian Empire, looked fondly to imperialists such as Cecil Rhodes and hoped his new binational Jewish state would be a protectorate of the German Empire, something for which he personally petitioned Kaiser Wilhelm II to no avail. Ahad Ha'am, by contrast, had grown up in a Yiddish-speaking Chabadnik household the Russian Empire, and was highly disdainful towards imperial domination, as he had seen it first hand with Black Hundredist pogroms in his home city of Odesa, and didn't seek to repeat such methods used by Russian imperialists in Palestine.

While Herzl was the one to organize the First Zionist Congress, it was ultimately Ahad Ha'am's ideas which initially dominated the movement. Even within his own faction of the Zionist Congress, he was rejected for his Germanophilic ideas, with Chaim Weizmann breaking away to form the Democratic Fraction.

=== Mandatory Palestine ===
Following the defeat of the Ottoman Empire in the Middle Eastern theatre, the British and French forces in the region, along with their Sharifian allies, declared the Occupied Enemy Territory Administration. Not long after this, the British government issued the Balfour Declaration to support Zionist aspirations. The declaration specifically included protections for the rights of non-Jewish residents in the Palestine region, where "nothing shall be done which may prejudice the civil and religious rights of existing non-Jewish communities in Palestine". Soon afterwards, the Mandate for Palestine was given to Britain at the San Remo conference. During this time, Chaim Weizmann was attempting to negotiate a "Sharifian Solution" to divide the territories of Ottoman Syria between the Yishuv, King Faisal I, and the British Empire. While Weizmann and Faisal reached an agreement, this was nullified by a ban on secret treaties from the Paris Peace Conference

British politician Herbert Samuel was appointed the first High Commissioner of Palestine. Himself a liberal Zionist, he also shared a concern towards the impacts Zionist settlement may have on Arab inhabitants, writing that he would "be ashamed... if it turned out that the establishment of a Jewish state involved injustice towards the Arabs". Thus, he sought to create a binational constitution for Mandatory Palestine. However, as a British Jew and a Zionist, he garnered distrust from Palestinian Arabs and disappointment from the leadership of the Yishuv.

It was during the Mandate period that liberal Zionism became politically active within the region. Following the passage of the Immigration Act of 1924 by the United States Congress, Jews started emigrating to Mandatory Palestine en mass. Previously, most Jews fleeing persecution, especially in the Russian Empire and during the Russian Civil War fled to the United States. However, with that pathway closed, and with the rising threat of fascism in Europe, Jewish refugees started fleeing to other places, mostly Palestine. These refugees were neither religious Zionists like World Mizrachi nor were they labor Zionists like Poale Zion or Hapoel Hatzair. Instead, most were middle class liberal non-Zionists or liberal Zionists. Thus, seeking to create a party to represent this constituency, Meir Dizengoff founded the General Zionists, a political party which would act as, at times, the main parliamentary opposition to the labor Zionist parties (Hapoel Hatzair and Ahdut HaAvoda before 1931 and Mapai after 1931) for the rest of the Mandate period.

With the growing number of Jews in Mandatory Palestine and the increasing tensions between Jews and Arabs, proposals for a binational Zionism became more forceful, especially as these tensions boiled over into intercommunal conflict. Philosopher Martin Buber wrote about the importance of accommodating Arab national aspirations within the region of Palestine, and proposed a binational state as a potential solution. He was joined by Arthur Ruppin, the founder of Tel Aviv, humanist philosopher Hugo Bergmann, historian of Kabbalah and philosopher Gershom Scholem, early Conservative Jewish pioneer and feminist Henrietta Szold, and, most notably, Reform Jewish rabbi Judah Leon Magnes to form Brit Shalom. Their solution to the growing conflict between Jews and Arabs was the creation of a federated state in which Jews and Arabs would live in their own cantons. This idea would become known as "Federal Zionism." While not particularly popular, especially after the Hebron massacre of 1929, they would continue to exist and even created their own political party, Ihud, in 1942.

Given the growing conflict between labor Zionists and revisionist Zionists over engagements with their British and Arab neighbors, liberal Zionists would remain a somewhat marginal force at this time. The General Zionists and their de facto leader, Chaim Weizmann, tended to lean towards more conciliatory measures with the British administration while seeking partition in relation to their Arab neighbors, thus putting them on the same side as their labor Zionist counterparts while rejecting the ardently nationalist claims of revisionist Zionists to "the whole land of Israel".

During the Fifth Aliyah, many anti-fascist German Jews fled to Mandatory Palestine in search of safety. With most of them being more left-leaning than the General Zionists, but not socialists like Mapai, they formed the New Aliyah Party to represent their interests, led by Pinchas Rosen. Unlike the classical liberal General Zionists, the New Aliyah Party were social liberals and progressives.

=== Israeli Independence ===
Upon Israeli independence in 1948, most liberal Zionists were highly supportive of this new Jewish state, which they believed is a guarantee for liberal values by fulfilling Jewish self-determination. Some, like Judah Leon Magnes and Martin Buber were critical of the methods used, including the expulsions of Palestinians, but accepted the Jewish state as a practical reality on the ground. Chaim Weizmann and Pinchas Rosen were both signatories of the Israeli Declaration of Independence, which proclaimed Israel to be a "Jewish and democratic state."

Liberal Zionists were split between the General Zionists, who opposed David Ben-Gurion's government, and Pinchas Rosen's new Progressive Party who supported it. Rosen was Israel's first Minister of Justice and repeatedly pushed for an Israeli constitution to no avail. At the same time, Chaim Weizmann, a stalwart member of the General Zionists, also served as the first President of Israel from independence in 1948 until his death in 1952.

During this time period, the Progressive Party still represented the Yekke German Jews who were part of the Fifth Aliyah while the General Zionists still tended to represent the middle class. In 1961, Rosen and Peretz Bernstein, leader of the General Zionists and another signatory of the Israeli Declaration of Independence, united their two parties to form the Israeli Liberal Party. However, by 1964, the right-leaning faction of the party was becoming dominant, seeking an alliance with the ardently right-wing Herut. In 1965, right-leaning liberal Zionists from the Liberal Party and revisionist Zionists from Herut formed a new party called Gahal, leaving Rosen dismayed and causing him to break away to form a new party, the Independent Liberals.

=== Six-Day War ===
Following the Six-Day War, liberal Zionists became critical of the Israeli occupation of Palestinian territories since 1967 while also promoting the idea of a Jewish state as a necessity. In this vein, many pro-Palestinian academics like Jerome Slayter and Nur Masalha interpret liberal Zionism as seeing Zionist and Israeli activity before 1967, such as the 1948 Palestine war and the resulting Palestinian expulsion and flight as a necessity.

Following a series of corruption scandals relating to the Israeli Labor Party, such as the Dollar Account affair and the Yadlin affair, a new dissident political party, Democratic Movement for Change was formed by Israel Defence Forces Aluf and archeologist Yigael Yadin. The party would come to power as part of the "Revolution" of 1977, when Likud entered government for the first time ever; Yadlin would serve as IDF Chief of Staff and Deputy Prime Minister from 1977 to 1981. Yadlin used his position to attempt to block settlements in the West Bank. He retired from politics out of disgust for Chief of Staff and far-right politician Rafael Eitan and a sense of disillusionment with the Begin government and disbanded the Democratic Movement for Change.

Shinui was founded by Knesset member Amnon Rubinstein, who was one of Yadlin's disciples, alongside journalist Tommy Lapid as a breakaway from the Democratic Movement for Change. It became the main party to promote free market economics, secularism, and fighting corruption. It was also one of the first parties to actively support peace with the Palestinians and LGBTQ+ rights in Israel.

During the 2000s, Kadima was the main centrist party, which had split from Likud and is now defunct. The party's platform identified with many of the fundamental policies of Liberal Zionist ideology, advocating among other things the need for Palestinian statehood (Two-state solution) in order to form a more democratic society in Israel, affirming the free market, and calling for equal rights for Arab citizens of Israel.

=== Judicial reform protests ===
During the Premiership of Benjamin Netanyahu, liberal Zionists gradually took the place of the labor Zionists as the largest opposition force. In 2012, news anchor Yair Lapid, the son of Tommy Lapid, founded liberal Zionist, secular, and centrist party Yesh Atid, which had become the second largest party in the Knesset following the 2013 Israeli legislative election. While it lost its status as the main opposition party in the 2015 Israeli legislative election, this was in part due to a two coalitions of multiple parties collectively pulling ahead of Yesh Atid.

During the 2018–2022 Israeli political crisis, Israel would hold five separate elections between April 2019 and 2022, with the main contenders being between right-wing parties and liberal Zionist parties. During this time, Yesh Atid remained active, though a new candidate, Benny Gantz, along with his Blue and White party would become the leading figures of the Israeli liberal opposition. This would be until 2020, when, in an attempt to resolve the Israeli political crisis and deal with the COVID-19 pandemic, he formed a unity government with Netanyahu, leading to the 2021 election. Following this, Yesh Atid returned to being the main opposition party in the Knesset.

This period in Israeli politics was marked by constant protests by liberal Zionists. Since the 2023 Israeli judicial reform, many liberal Zionists have participated in widespread protests with calls for civil disobedience, including many reservists such as Brothers and Sisters in Arms refusing to show up for duty under the Netanyahu government. During the Gaza war liberal Zionists protested the Netanyahu government, calling for a ceasefire in order to return Israeli hostages kidnapped by Hamas on October 7th.

== Jewish diaspora ==
Liberal Zionism has long had a following among the Jewish diaspora, in particular in countries with long traditions of Jewish liberalism.

=== United States ===
Most American Jews have, since the Progressive Era, been supportive of Zionism and, since the New Deal, most have been supportive of modern liberalism. Figures such as progressive Supreme Court Justice Louis Brandeis were important in promoting the Zionist movement in the United States, as well as Americanizing it for Jewish American tastes and political preferences. One feature which seemingly defined American Zionism was its willingness to be combative with Israeli Zionism, such as Brandeis' rivalry with Chaim Weizmann or the general Jewish American opposition to David Ben-Gurion and Benjamin Netanyahu, while still broadly defending Israel's right to exist as a Jewish and democratic state.

==== American liberalism and Zionism ====
Louis Brandeis gradually became involved with the Zionist Federation of America and Zionism during the later years of his career. He became the most notable spokesman for the creation of a Jewish homeland during World War I, arguing that the solution to the "Jewish problem" would be the assertion of Jewish nationality. He argued that liberalism, though an improvement for the Jewish people, had not succeeded in emancipating the Jews from persecution. Arguing that democracy and nationalism were intertwined, and that Jews could be patriotic Americans and supporters of a Jewish national home, he called for the creation of a Zionist movement both opposed to the aristocracies of Europe and which promoted a liberal internationalist foreign policy, similar to Wilsonianism.

Stephen Samuel Wise was a Reform rabbi at the New York Free Synagogue. Similarly minded to Brandeis, Wise was an opponent of concentrated wealth, which he viewed as contradictory to American democracy, as well as an early supporter of Zionism. In 1918, he, along with Louis Brandeis and other major Jewish American figures, such as Associate Justice of the Supreme Court of the United States Felix Frankfurter, founded the American Jewish Congress in Independence Hall, Philadelphia, with the goal of democratizing American Judaism away from elitist, German-American Jewish-dominated conservative organizations like the American Jewish Committee and B'nai Brith that didn't represent the newer Ashkenazi immigrants and their children. The American Jewish Congress would acquire a reputation for being very liberal, being among the first to oppose the Nazi regime. Wise led a major demonstration in opposition to the Nazi government in Madison Square Garden in 1933 and was part of the early efforts to organize an anti-Nazi boycott. Wise and the AJC were also among the first to be alerted of the atrocities of the Holocaust and Auschwitz, with World Jewish Congress representative Gerhart M. Riegner sending the Riegner telegram to Wise and the London office of the WJC.

Following the Second World War, the American Jewish Congress remained committed to both Zionism and cultural pluralism. Democratic President Harry S. Truman was active in trying to sway in the United Nations vote on the partition of Palestine, a position influenced both by what he saw of the genocide against European Jewry by the Nazis and the influence of Stephen Wise. Joachim Prinz, a Holocaust survivor himself, would lead the AJC from 1958 to 1966. He would be active in the civil rights movement, being the speaker at the 1963 March on Washington right before Martin Luther King Jr.

The role of liberal Zionists like the American Jewish Congress inspired not only Jewish liberal Zionists in the United States but also gentile liberal Zionists. The Kennedy family was particularly notable for their support for the Jewish state. During the Presidency of John F. Kennedy, the United States became allies with the State of Israel as a bulwark against communism in the Middle East and as a triumphal national revival of the Jewish people. Nonetheless, Kennedy was critical of Israel's nuclear program. JFK's younger brother, Robert F. Kennedy, was more explicitly supportive of Israel. Bobby Kennedy had visited Mandatory Palestine one month before partition and wrote positively of Jewish courage in resisting the British and their strong sense of anti-communism. These views, as well as his support for Israel in the Six-Day War, were in part what motivated his assassination by Palestinian American Sirhan Sirhan.

While a bipartisan pro-Israel consensus began to emerge in American politics, not all Americans agreed on what that mean, with American liberals becoming critical of Israel's military occupation of the West Bank. Among American Jewish liberal Zionists, sympathizers with the pro-peace, anti-occupation, and left-leaning Israeli organization, Peace Now, formed their own organization, Americans for Peace Now, in 1978. However, this new organization would be marginal within American Jewish life. Other liberal Zionists, such as Joe Biden, would be more vocal, proclaiming in a speech given on the Senate floor in 1986 that "it is the best $3 billion investment we make. Were there not an Israel the United States of America would have to invent an Israel to protect her interests in the region."

With the collapse of the Israeli-Palestinian peace process following the Second Intifada, many liberal and progressive American Jews sought to pressure both the United States government and the Israeli government to continue pursuing peace and the two-state solution with the Palestinians. In 2007, J Street, a Jewish, liberal Zionist lobbying organization was founded in order to counter more ardently Zionist organizations like AIPAC and promote the peace process. According to its founder Jeremy Ben-Ami, most Jewish organizations were no longer representing the mainstream Jewish position on the Israeli-Palestinian conflict, and thus a new organization needed to be formed. J Street mostly works to lobby the United States government to promote policies which uphold Israeli democracy, limit West Bank settlement, and move the region closer to a two-state solution. By contrast, Democratic Majority for Israel was founded in 2019 by Mark Mellman as a more ardently pro-Israel organization. However, since Donald Trump's second term, it has become critical of Donald Trump's policies towards Gaza.

Jewish organizations representing Jewish members of the Democratic Party are often liberal Zionist. The National Jewish Democratic Council was founded in 1990 to represent Jewish members of the Democratic Party and to prevent the Republican Party from poaching Jewish voters. The main issues of the NJDC were maintaining a strong Israel-United States relationship, separation of church and state, and abortion rights. However, the organization began to decline after a defamation lawsuit was filed by Jewish conservative Republican megadonor Sheldon Adelson in 2014. By 2016, the organization was effectively defunct. However, only a year later, the White nationalist Unite the Right rally in Charlottesville galvanized the Jewish American community, leading former members of the NJDC to form the Jewish Democratic Council of America. While maintaining certain liberal Zionist policies, such as fighting campus antisemitism and supporting a strong Israel-United States relationship, they broadly support primarily liberal and progressive causes, such as abortion rights, climate change mitigation, gun control, expanding access to healthcare, taxing the rich, ICE abolition, protecting voting rights among many others. They are also adamantly anti-Trump, stating that his administration has enabled antisemitism.

==== Reform Zionism ====
Reform Judaism, while initially anti-Zionist, gradually began to change course in the face of rising antisemitism both in Europe and in America. As the dominant form of Judaism in the United States, Reform initially sought to promote Jewish assimilation, something which was core to the tenets of the Pittsburgh Platform of 1885. The Pittsburg Platform was the most radical statement of religious liberalism among the different streams of American Judaism. In the minds of Reform Jewish leaders, assimilation and emancipation were intertwined, and thus advocating notions of Jewish nationhood ultimately flew in the face of that goal. But following the horrors reported about the Kishinev pogrom, American Reform Jews increasingly became more interested in milder forms of Zionism, especially cultural Zionism.

The Kishinev pogrom also spurred the creation of the American Jewish Congress, arguably one of the first explicitly Zionist organizations in the United States. Increasingly, the AJC began working with members of Reform Jewish institutions, such as the Hebrew Union College and the Positive-Historical/Conservative Jewish Theological Seminary of America. Members from these organizations formed the core of the Federation of American Zionists by 1904. As the Zionist movement gained members, Reform Judaism was forced to change its attitudes. By 1937, the Pittsburg Platform was done away with and replaced by the Columbus Platform, which accepted the legitimacy of Reform Zionism.

As time went on more explicit support for Zionism grew within the Reform movement. For most American Jews, the Six-Day War was seen as an example of Jewish empowerment and overcoming the legacy of the Holocaust, as well as the point when almost the entirety of the American Jewish community became Zionist in some form or another. Reform Judaism was not exempted from these trends, and released its Centenary Perspective in 1976, which acknowledged Jews as not merely a religion but also as the descendants of the Hebrews, but also called for dialogue between the State of Israel and the Jewish diaspora rather than one negating the other. In 1997, the Central Conference of American Rabbis released the Miami Platform, which further enshrined the Reform movement's connection and commitment to Zionism.

The main organization representing Reform Zionism in the United States is the Association of Reform Zionists of America, an organization associated with both the World Zionist Organization and the Union for Reform Judaism, the main body representing Reform Judaism in America, which was founded in 1977. The primary goals of ARZA are to promote Reform Judaism in Israel and to uphold Israeli democracy and pluralism. The primary way they seek to do this is by promoting gender equality, supporting civil marriage, increasing cultural acceptance of converts, and upholding equality between Arabs and Jews. ARZA is an arm of the Union for Reform Judiasm, which promotes tikkun olam, or "repairing the world" as part of its platform. This includes support for historic and current American liberal and progressive causes, such as its support for civil rights, opposition to the Vietnam War, ordaining female rabbis, inclusion of LGBT Jewish voices, defending transgender rights, and support for Democratic Presidents such as John F. Kennedy and Barack Obama. In order to reconcile their support for the universalist message of tikkun olam with the particularist message of Zionism, ARZA and URJ are adamant in their support for the two-state solution and remaining critical of the Israeli occupation of the West Bank, viewing the creation of an independent Palestinian state not as antithetical to Zionism, but rather crucial to saving it as a Jewish democracy.

=== South Africa ===
South African Jews were historically disproportionately involved in anti-apartheid activism. South African Jewry has also been highly supportive of the State of Israel. Historically, there has been a long history of Jewish students being involved in the anti-apartheid National Union of South African Students and related Students' Representative Councils while simultaneously being involved in Zionist youth movements.

==== Anti-Apartheid activism ====
Harry Schwarz, a Holocaust survivor who escaped Nazi Germany in 1934 and served in the South African army during WWII to fight the Nazis. A lawyer by training, he served as junior council to Nelson Mandela during the Rivonia Trial. He supported the African National Congress's goal of non-racialism but opposed the violence of their militant arm, Umkhonto we Sizwe, claiming "'I regard violence something to be avoided at all costs.'" Schwarz would come to lead the United Party in 1951, arguing the victory of the National Party in 1948 had been a fluke and seeking to unify Afrikaans and English speakers behind ousting the illegitimate party. Schwarz would enter Parliament in 1974 with the United Party, only to break away over their obstinant conservatism and form the more actively liberal, anti-apartheid and non-racialist Reform Party, eventually going on to join with the Progressive Party of Colin Eglin to form the Progressive Federal Party by 1977. Schwarz would condemn the United States for having previously supported the apartheid regime while also not helping in the building of their newer multiracial democracy. Schwarz was an active member of the Jewish community, playing an important role in the South African Jewish Board of Deputies. In his role within the JBD, Schwarz would frequently get into spats with the neo-Nazi and pro-apartheid activist and leader of the Afrikaner Weerstandsbeweging Eugène Terre'Blanche. He would also meet with Shimon Peres and Yitzhak Shamir (then operating as part of a national unity government back in Israel) to ensure a continuing connection between Israel and the South African Jewish community. Schwarz also met with Mandela as a representative of the JBD to discuss the issue of Israel, to which Mandela reportedly sympathized with the Jews as they antisemitic attacks coming from far-right pro-apartheid figures and that he did not endorse all of the tactics utilized by the Palestine Liberation Organization.

Helen Suzman would come to be known as the most prominent opponent of apartheid from within the South African government. The daughter of Jewish Lithuanian parents, Suzman had long been an opponent of racism in South Africa. She had been a major researcher for the Fagan Commission, which argued for decreasing segregation in urban centers. Suzman was elected to Parliament in 1953 as a member of the United Party, being only one of two MPs to vote against the Separate Amenities Act. In opposition to the conservatism of the Unity Party, Suzman joined 11 other MPs to form the Progressive Party, advocating for non-racialism and qualified suffrage as well as a one voter roll for all races. In 1961, Suzman would be the only member of the Progressive Party to win her seat, after which she would become the only MP to ever consistently vote against all apartheid legislation. While never passionate about her Zionism, Suzman was an adiment believer in Israel's right to exist, and actively challenged those who denied its right. Having spoken Yiddish growing up, Suzman understood herself to be culturally and ethnically Jewish and pro-Israel.

=== Other places ===
The Union of Reform Judaism in the United States is part of the World Union for Progressive Judaism. While Reform Zionism is mostly an American Jewish idea, the WUPJ's other branches in the United Kingdom, South Africa, Oceania, Germany, the Netherlands, among many others are also all broadly Reform Zionist in orientation.

== Criticism ==
=== Palestinians ===
Palestinian writer Nur Masalha criticized Liberal Zionist intellectuals such as Sternhell as a "liberal coloniser who promotes the myth of 'the clash of two rights and two justices'" by creating a "fallacy of balance and false symmetry between the colonised and the coloniser, between the indigenous and the European settler, between the ethnically cleansed and the ethnic cleanser". Masalha views supporters of Liberal Zionism as "always torn by the demands of Zionist patriotism and the need for human decency".

=== Jewish anti-Zionists ===
Jewish Voice for Peace is an American Left and Jewish left organization which seeks to promote Jewish anti-Zionism and support Boycott, Divestment, and Sanctions and the Palestinian right of return. According to JVP, "Zionism, in the words of its founders, is an explicitly 'colonial' ideology ... Zionism is a 19th century political ideology that claimed Jewish safety required a Jewish-only nation-state ... Zionism has been used to justify massacres of Palestinians by the Israeli military, the destruction of villages and olive groves, and a military occupation that separates families with checkpoints and walls." They argue that "The political ideology of Zionism, regardless of which strain, has resulted in the establishment of a Jewish nation-state in the land of historic Palestine. In 1948, 750,000 Palestinians were expelled as part of that process, their homes and property confiscated. Despite recognition of their rights by the United Nations, their rights to return and be compensated have long been denied by the US and Israel. In 1967, Israel occupied what is now known as the Occupied Palestinian Territories, putting millions of people under military rule. Longstanding systemic inequalities privilege Jews over Palestinians inside Israel and in the Occupied Territories." In October 2025, two years after the October 7 attacks, rabbi Shaul Magid explains that the "Zionist consensus" of liberal Zionism has "lost its hegemonic hold" as "the compatibility of 'liberalism' and 'Zionism' feels increasingly untenable".

=== Jewish Zionists ===
Meir Kahane was a radical, far-right Religious Zionist and Golus nationalist who was highly critical of liberal Zionism, viewing it as a greater threat to the Jewish people than Palestinian nationalism. Kahane condemned what he saw as "Comfortable Jews", exemplified by liberal Zionists like Michael Lerner, which weakened the Jewish people's connection to their faith and identity. Kahane also distained the idea of a Jewish and democratic state, arguing that "democracy and Judaism are not the same thing" and instead favoring a theocratic Halachic state ruled by Jewish religious law.

== Main organizations ==
=== Political parties ===
- General Zionists (1922–1961)
- New Aliyah Party (1942–1948)
- Progressive Party (1948–1961)
- Israeli Liberal Party (1961–1988)
- Independent Liberals (1965–1992)
- Shinui (1974–2006)
- Democratic Movement for Change (1976–1978)
- Third Way (1996–2011)
- Kadima (2005–2015)
- Yesh Atid (2012–present)
- Hatnua (2012–2019)
- Gesher (2018–present)
- Blue and White (2018–present)
- Israel Democratic Party (2019–present)
- The Democrats (2024–present) (Note: The Democrats were founded by the merger of two labor Zionist parties, Israeli Labor Party and Meretz, but The Democrats define themselves as "liberal-democratic Zionist", not officially "labor Zionist".)
- Yashar (2025–present)

=== Non-governmental ===
- Peace Now
- J Street

== See also ==
- Liberalism and nationalism
- Liberalism in Israel
- General Zionism
- Ratz (political party)
- Reform Zionism
- Zionist Union
- Secular Zionism
