= Rudolph Grossman =

Austrian-born American rabbi

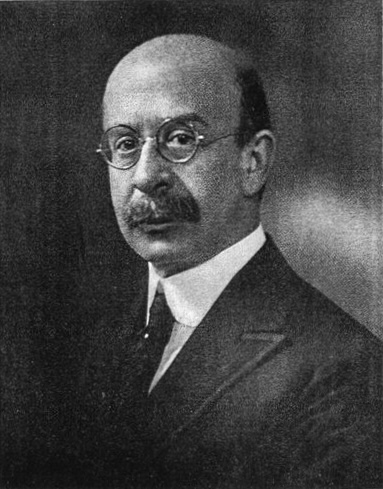

Rudolph Grossman (July 24, 1867 – September 22, 1927) was an Austrian-born American rabbi.

== Life ==
Grossman was born on July 24, 1867, in Vienna, Austria, the son of Rabbi Ignaz Grossmann and Nettie Rosenbaum. His brother was Rabbi Louis Grossmann.

Grossman immigrated to America as a child and attended school in Brooklyn and Chicago. The son and brother of rabbis, he entered Hebrew Union College in Cincinnati, Ohio, when he was fourteen and studied under its founder Isaac M. Wise. He graduated from there in 1889 at the top of his class and as its valedictorian, and he received a D.D. from there in 1892. In 1889, he also graduated from, at the top of his class, the University of Cincinnati with a B.L. He became associate rabbi of Temple Beth-El in New York City, New York, in 1889. He worked there until 1896, when he became rabbi of Congregation Rodeph Sholom in New York City. From 1898 to 1900, he was Grand Chaplain of the Freemason Grand Lodge of New York. In 1902, he was corresponding secretary of the Central Conference of American Rabbis. He also wrote a number of essays for Jewish and non-Jewish magazines.

Grossman was vice-president and president of the Association of Reform Rabbis of New York, president of the Jewish Religious School Union of New York and the New York Board of Jewish Ministers, and a member of the Commission on Jewish Religious Literature. He was also the founder of the Beth-El Sisterhood, a member of the governing board of Hebrew Union College, and a member of the Central Conference of American Rabbis. In 1892, he married Martha Keller. Their children were Mrs. Justus Grun, Mrs. David Vorhaus, and Mrs. Arthur Kitsheimer. He was still rabbi of Rodeph Sholom when he died.

Grossman died at home from heart disease on September 22, 1927. Over two thousand people attended his funeral in the West End Synagogue, with another five hundred standing outside the synagogue. The funeral service was conducted by Rabbi Stephen S. Wise, Grossman's former pupil, and Rabbi Nathan Stern, the West End Synagogue's rabbi. The honorary pallbearers included Congregation Rodeph Sholom president Henry M. Goldfogle and other officials from the Congregation, Congregation trustees (including Irving J. Joseph), and several rabbis (including Nathan Stern, Stephen S. Wise, Barnett A. Elzas, Hyman G. Enelow, Israel Goldstein, Sidney Goldstein, Maurice H. Harris, Nathan Krass, Isaac Landman, Alexander Lyons, and Joseph Silverman). His funeral was also attended by New York Supreme Court Justice Aaron J. Levy, General Sessions Judge Otto A. Rosalsky, Joseph S. Rosalsky, and Magistrates Edward Weil and Louis B. Brodsky.
