= Clifton H. Levy =

Clifton Harby Levy (June 21, 1867 – March 17, 1962) was a Jewish-American rabbi and author.

== Life ==
Levy was born on June 21, 1867, in New Orleans, Louisiana, the son of Eugene Henry Levy and Almeria E. Moses. His family lived in America since 1740.

Levy attended New Orleans schools and the Cincinnati high school. He then went to the University of Cincinnati and Hebrew Union College, graduating from the former with a B.A. in 1887 and being ordained a rabbi by the latter in 1890. In that year, he started organizing classes for immigrant children. He served as rabbi of the Congregation Gates of Hope in New York City from 1890 to 1891, Shaari Shomayim in Lancaster, Pennsylvania from 1892 to 1894, and the Eden St. Temple in Baltimore, Maryland from 1894 to 1896. While in Baltimore, he did graduate studies at Johns Hopkins University from 1895 to 1896 and edited the Jewish Comment from 1894 to 1896.

Levy organized Baltimore's first Jewish kindergarten in a religious school and its first United Jewish Charities. Growing tired of congregational life, he moved to New York City to begin a writing career. He wrote articles about Biblical archaeology for various Jewish newspapers. He founded and organized the Tremont Temple in the Bronx, serving as its rabbi from 1906 to 1921. He also organized the International Copyright Bureau in 1909 and briefly headed it.

In 1924, Levy organized the Center of Jewish Science to counter the influence Christian Science was having on middle-class Jews and introduce spirituality into Reform Judaism. He later founded the anti-Zionist American Council for Judaism. In 1886, while still a student, he published the five-act play Haman and Mordecai. He edited The Bible in Art in 1936 and The Bible in Pictures in 1942. He also served as art editor of the Universal Jewish Encyclopedia.

In 1891, Levy married Sarah Lang in a ceremony conducted by Rabbi Joseph Silverman and witnessed by Rabbi Rudolph Grossman. She died, and in 1903 Lang married Cora Bacharach in a ceremony conducted by Rabbi Louis Grossmann. He was president of the New York Board of Rabbis, a founding member of the New York Association of Reform Rabbis, and a board member of the Boy Scouts of America and the Society for the Prevention of Cruelty to Children.

Levy died in New York City on March 17, 1962.
