= Naamah Kelman =

American-born Rabbi (born 1955)

Naamah Kelman נעמה קלמן
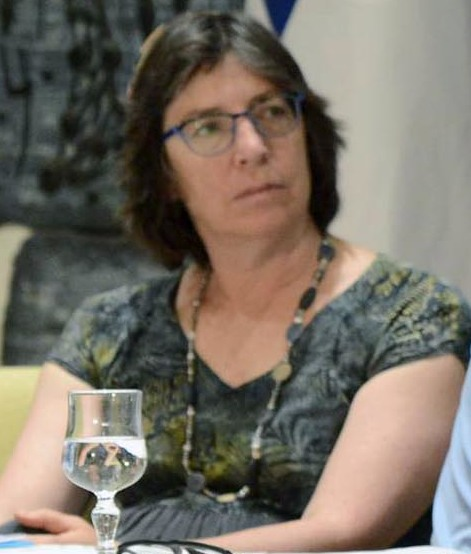

Religious life
- Religion: Judaism
- Denomination: Reform

Jewish leader
- Organization: Hebrew Union College-Jewish Institute of Religion

Naamah Kelman-Ezrachi (also spelled Naama) (Hebrew: נעמה קלמן; born January 25, 1955) is an American-born Israeli Reform rabbi who was named as Dean of the Hebrew Union College-Jewish Institute of Religion campus in Jerusalem starting in July 2009. In 1992, Kelman made history as the first woman in Israel to become a rabbi when she received her rabbinic ordination from Rabbi Alfred Gottschalk.

== Biography ==
Kelman was born in New York City, the daughter of Rabbi Wolfe Kelman, a leader in the Conservative Judaism movement who had served nearly four decades as executive vice president of its Rabbinical Assembly, where he led efforts to professionalize the rabbinate and to prepare the steps for the ordination of women in the Conservative movement. The descendant of rabbis on both sides of her family, her paternal grandfather was a rabbi and community leader in Toronto who descended from a multi-generational line of Hasidic rabbis from Poland. Her maternal grandfather, Rabbi Felix A. Levy, also received his ordination from HUC and helped pass the Columbus Platform of 1937 that undid many of the anti-Zionist aspects of the 1885 Pittsburgh Platform. Her brother, Levi Weiman Kelman, also a rabbi, leads a congregation in Jerusalem.

As a student at the University of Pennsylvania, she graduated with a Bachelor of Arts degree. After moving to Israel in 1976, she earned a Master of Arts degree in Social Work from the Institute of Contemporary Jewry at Hebrew University of Jerusalem. As of 2009, Kelman was pursuing a Ph.D. at Bar-Ilan University in Ramat Gan, with a focus on "The Construction of Meaning for Young Israelis: Examining Non-Orthodox Weddings."

Her husband, Elan Ezrachi, is a former Israeli Air Force pilot, who specializes in Israeli relations with Jewish communities in the Diaspora. They had two daughters, Leora and Daphna, a son, Mikey, and 4 grandchildren, as of 2017. Leora (full name Leora Ezrachi-Vered) was ordained by the Hebrew Union College-Jewish Institute of Religion campus in Jerusalem, as the 100th Israeli Reform rabbi, in 2017. Rabbi Leora Ezrachi-Vered is currently the leader of Nigun Halev Congregation in the Yazreel Valley.

== Rabbinic career ==
On July 23, 1992, HUC President Rabbi Alfred Gottschalk oversaw Kelman's "historic and symbolic" ordination at the school's Jerusalem campus as Israel's first woman rabbi. Hebrew Union College named her to serve as the first female Dean of the HUC campus in Jerusalem effective July 1, 2009, when she succeeded Michael Marmur. She wrote the piece "Personal Reflection: A First Rabbi, from a Long Line of Rabbis", which appears in the book The Sacred Calling: Four Decades of Women in the Rabbinate, published in 2016.

== Other ==
The 2022 art exhibit “Holy Sparks”, shown among other places at the Dr. Bernard Heller Museum, featured art about twenty-four female rabbis who were firsts in some way; Ellen Alt created the artwork about Kelman that was in that exhibit.
