= New Pittsburgh Platform =

The New Pittsburgh Platform is the 1999 platform for American Reform Judaism. The "Statement of Principles" was adopted by the Central Conference of American Rabbis in May, 1999. The New Pittsburgh Platform was a "centrist" compromise between the traditionalist and Classical wings of the Reform movement. The New Pittsburgh Platform was issued 114 years after the first Reform platform, the Pittsburgh Platform of 1885.

== The Platform ==
The 1999 Pittsburgh Platform affirmed that "God, Torah and Israel" are the core principles of the Reform movement. Calling on all Reform Jews to "engage in a dialogue with the sources" of the Reform movement, the platform was a "centrist" compromise between traditionalists within Reform Judaism who called for more ritual observance and Classical Reform Jews who sought to adhere more closely to the principles of the original Pittsburgh Platform of 1885. The platform emphasized the importance of mitzvot as "sacred obligations", affirmed the importance of studying Hebrew, and called for Reform Jews to engage in "ongoing study of the whole array of (mitzvot)". Observance of Shabbat is encouraged. The platform expresses support for "Medinat Yisrael" (the State of Israel) and encourages aliyah.

The platform was largely the work of Rabbi Richard N. Levy. Rabbi Levy, a traditionalist, had drafted a platform that endorsed the observance of kashrut and the use of the mikveh, but the final document was substantially altered to appeal to both traditionalists and classicists.

== See also ==
- Columbus Platform
- Miami Platform
- Pittsburgh Platform
- Reform Judaism: A Centenary Perspective
