= Maximilian Heller =

Czech-born American rabbi (1860–1929)

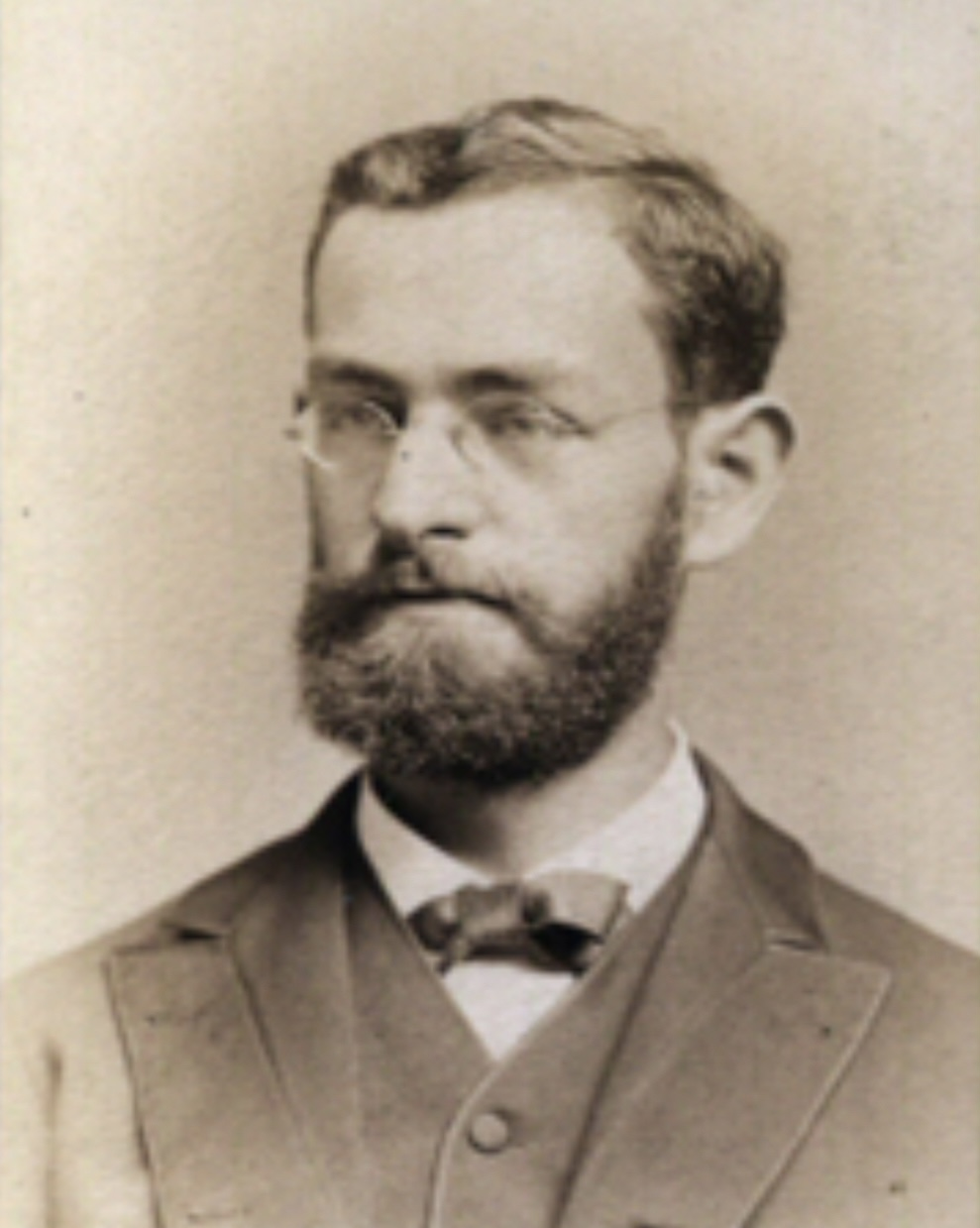

Maximilian Heller (January 31, 1860 – March 30, 1929) was a Czech-born American rabbi.

== Life ==
Heller was born on January 31, 1860, in Prague, Bohemia, Austrian Empire, the son of well-to-do wool merchant Simon Heller and Mathilde Kassowitz. He came from a long and distinguished lineage of rabbis and scholars. He grew up in Prague's Jewish ghetto of Josefov.

Heller's father faced severe financial setbacks in the late 1870s, which motivated the family to immigrate to America. Heller stayed in Prague to finish his education at the Neustadter Gymnasium and prepare for a proposed medical career. But as his family's financial situation didn't improve enough to afford continuing his education in Europe, he immigrated to America following his graduating from the Gymnasium in 1879 and lived with them in Chicago, Illinois. Within months, he moved to Cincinnati, Ohio and enrolled in the recently established Hebrew Union College as well as the University of Cincinnati. While at the latter school, he was a member of Phi Beta Kappa. He graduated from the University of Cincinnati with a B.L. degree in 1882 and with a M.L. degree in philosophy in 1884. He was ordained a rabbi by Hebrew Union College in 1884 as part of its second ordination class.

Heller was rabbi of Zion Congregation in Chicago from 1884 to 1886 and of Congregation Beth El in Houston, Texas from 1886 to 1887. He was only rabbi in Houston for five months when he became a rabbi of Temple Sinai in New Orleans, Louisiana. He served there for 40 years, retiring from there in 1927. He was active in New Orleans' civic and educational life, especially in promoting education and fighting to abolish the Louisiana State Lottery. He was a member of the State Board of Education from 1892 to 1896. He was Professor of Hebrew and Hebrew Literature at Tulane University from his appointment in 1912 to his retirement in 1928. He was a charter member of the Central Conference of American Rabbis and served as its president from 1909 to 1911. He was editor of the New Orleans Jewish Leader from 1896 to 1897, an editorial writer for The American Israelite from 1902 to 1914, and a frequent contributor to the local press. He also wrote The Temple Pulpit (a collection of his sermons), The Souvenir in honor of Temple Sinai's 50th anniversary in 1922, and My Month in Palestine (which was edited posthumously by his son James and published in 1930). An enthusiastic Zionist from the inception of the movement, he was prominent in the Zionist Organization of America and served as its honorary vice-president from 1911 until his death.

Heller became interested in Zionism through his love of modern Hebrew literature and while serving with Rabbi Bernhard Felsenthal at Zion Congregation in Chicago. He initially kept quiet about his support of Zionism out of respect for his former teacher Rabbi Isaac Mayer Wise, who was ardently opposed to Zionism. Within two years of Wise's death, he publicly declared himself a Zionist, despite widespread opposition to Zionism in Reform Judaism at the time. His election as vice-president of the Central Conference of American Rabbis in 1907 and as president in 1909 were controversial due to his support for Zionism. He sought to bridge the divide between Reform Judaism and Zionism, fighting to make Reform Judaism more accepting of Zionists and encouraging Zionist Reform rabbis to remain part of the Reform movement. In 1903, he sought to be a rabbi at Temple Emanu-El in New York City, New York following the death of its former rabbi Gustav Gottheil, who spoke out in favor of Zionism, only to be passed over in favor of Rabbi Joseph Silverman. In 1927, after he became rabbi emeritus, he travelled through Palestine, had his travel diaries printed in the New Orleans Daily States, and attended the Fifteenth World Zionist Congress in Basel, Switzerland on his way home from his tour.

Heller was president of the Hebrew Union College Alumni Association, honorary president of the Jewish Publication Society of America, and a member of the American Jewish Historical Society, the American Oriental Society, the American Association for the Advancement of Science, the Round Table Club, and the Oakland Country Club. In 1889, he married Ida Annie Marks, the daughter of an old Portuguese Jewish family in New Orleans. Their children were James, Cecile, Isaac, and Ruth. Their son James G. Heller was also a Reform rabbi.

Heller died in New Orleans on March 30, 1929. Nearly two thousand people attended his funeral at Temple Sinai, including representatives from various Jewish and non-Jewish sections of the community. Rabbi Emil W. Leipziger of Touro Synagogue, Dr. Mendel Silber of the Gates of Prayer Congregation, Rabbi Moses H. Goldberg of the Orthodox Chevra Tillim. Rabbi David Eichman of the Jewish Federation, and Heller's successor at Temple Sinai Rabbi Louis Binstock participated in the service, with Binstock delivering the eulogy and the other five rabbis reciting prayers and reading psalms. The funeral procession was a mile long. He was buried in Hebrew Rest Cemetery.
