= Samuel H. Goldenson =

Polish-born American rabbi (1878–1962)

Samuel Harry Goldenson (March 26, 1878 – August 31, 1962) was a Polish-born American rabbi.

== Life ==
Goldenson was born on March 26, 1878, in Kalvarija, Poland, the son of Hyman Goldenson and Fanny Leah Frankel.

Goldenson came to America with his family when he was twelve and settled with them in Rochester, New York. He then went to Hebrew Union College and University of Cincinnati. He graduated from both in 1904, receiving his ordination as a rabbi from the College and a B.A. degree from the University. He later went to Columbia University, receiving an A.M. degree from there in 1914 and a Ph.D. in 1917. In 1925, he received an honorary D.H.L. from Hebrew Union College. He served as rabbi of Congregation Adath Israel in Lexington, Kentucky, from 1904 to 1906, Congregation Beth Emeth in Albany, New York, from 1906 to 1918, and Rodef Shalom Congregation in Pittsburgh, Pennsylvania, from 1918 to 1934. While in Albany and Pittsburgh, he was active in various campaigns for civic reforms and social justice. A number of his sermons have been published, he wrote Reconstruction in 1919, and he contributed to Harper's symposium Religion and the Modern Mind in 1929.

Goldenson became senior rabbi of Congregation Emanu-El of New York in New York City, New York, in 1934. He served as rabbi there until 1947, after which he became rabbi emeritus. He spent the last years of his career preaching in small communities under the auspices of the Union of American Hebrew Congregations. He followed the older stream of Reform Judaism, which emphasized the universal message of Judaism and was unsympathetic towards Zionism and the revised interest in ceremonial matters. He criticized and attacked Mordecai Kaplan's emphasis on Judaism as a civilization. He served as president of the Central Conference of American Rabbis from 1933 to 1935, when he was confronted by the rise of Nazi Germany and the Great Depression. When the Zionist Felix A. Levy succeeded him as president, he refused to serve on the executive committee. He later joined the American Council for Judaism and served as vice-president of the World Union for Progressive Judaism.

In 1905, Goldenson married Claudia V. Myar. Their children were Evelyn Beatrice (wife of Naaman Glick), Robert Myer, and William Lee.

Goldenson died from a long illness at Stamford Hospital in Stamford, Connecticut, on August 31, 1962. The funeral was held at Temple Emanu-El, with the senior rabbi Julius Mark officiating the service and Rabbi Nathan A. Perilman assisting. He was buried in Beth El Cemetery in Queens.
