= Louis Grossmann =

Austrian-born Jewish-American rabbi

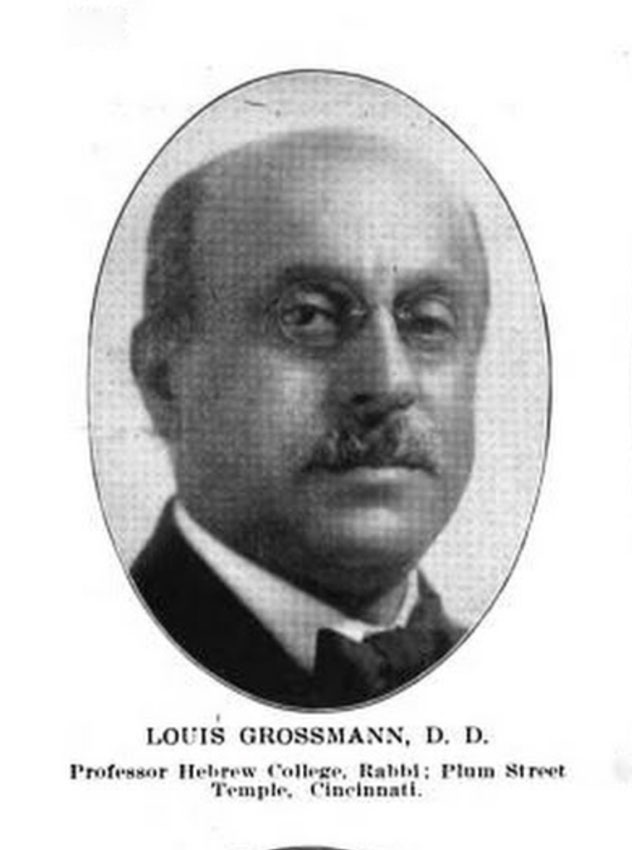

Louis Grossmann (February 24, 1863 – September 21, 1926) was an Austrian-born Jewish-American rabbi and professor.

== Life ==
Grossmann was born on February 24, 1863, in Vienna, Austria, the son of Rabbi Ignaz Grossmann and Nettie Rosenbaum. His brother was Rabbi Rudolph Grossman.

Grossmann immigrated to America when he was ten with his father, who became rabbi of Congregation Beth Elohim in Brooklyn, New York. He moved to Cincinnati, Ohio, three years later to study at Hebrew Union College, which had been founded only a year beforehand. He also entered Hughes High School at the same time. He graduated from the University of Cincinnati in 1884. He was ordained a rabbi at Hebrew Union College that year, and in 1888 he received a Doctor of Divinity from there.

Grossmann became rabbi of Temple Beth El in Detroit, Michigan, in 1884. He began writing books about Judaism in 1889 and contributed to Jewish periodicals. He served as rabbi at Temple Beth El until 1898, when he succeeded Rabbi Isaac Mayer Wise as rabbi of Congregation B'nai Jeshurun in Cincinnati. He was also appointed a Professor at Hebrew Union College that year, teaching theology, ethics, and pedagogy. As pedagogy professor, he was a pioneer in methodology to Jewish education in America and wrote a number of pamphlets on the subject to help teachers. He also served as principal of the Teachers Institute of Hebrew Union College from its founding in 1909 until its discontinuance. He was president of the Central Conference of American Rabbis from 1917 to 1919. Hebrew Union College gave him a D.H.L. degree in 1922. In that year, he retired as professor of Hebrew Union College and rabbi of B'nai Jeshurun, becoming professor emeritus and rabbi emeritus respectively.

Grossmann was an organization committee member of the 1911 First Universal Races Congress in London, president of the Jewish Religious Education of Ohio and the Rabbinical Association of Ohio, a founder and honorary president of the Western Association of Jewish Ministers, a lecturer on Jewish ethics at the Lewisohn Foundation in New York City in 1909, and an editorial writer of The American Israelite. He never married.

Following Grossmann's retirement as rabbi he moved to Long Beach, California, living there for the last five years of his life. While visiting Detroit, he died in the home of Dr. Charles A. Ahron on September 21, 1926. His body was sent to Cincinnati, where his body lay in state at the Plum Street Temple. Grossmann's successor as rabbi of Plum Street Temple Rabbi James G. Heller, Heller's father and Grossmann's former classmate Maximilian Heller, Hebrew Union College president Dr. Julian Morgenstern, and Dr. Leo M. Franklin all conducted the funeral service. He was buried in the Walnut Hills Jewish Cemetery.
