= James Heller =

James Heller may refer to:

- James G. Heller (1892–1971), American composer and rabbi
- James Heller (24 character), fictional president in the TV series 24
- The protagonist in the video game Prototype 2
