= Hyman G. Enelow =

New York rabbi

Hyman Gerson Enelow (October 26, 1877 – February 6, 1934) was a Russian-born American rabbi of the New York Congregation Emanu-El.

== Life ==
Enelow was born on October 26, 1877, in Kaunas, Russia, the son of merchant Leopold Enelow and Matilda Marver.

Enelow moved to Liepāja with his family when he was an infant. In 1893, he immigrated to America with his family and settled in Chicago, Illinois. He intended to study at the University of Heidelberg, but en route he changed his mind and went to America. Under the influence of Emil G. Hirsch and Joseph Stolz, he went to the University of Chicago prior to going to Hebrew Union College in 1895. He received a B.A. from the University of Cincinnati in 1897 and was an English fellow there from 1897 to 1898. He was ordained a rabbi at Hebrew Union College in 1898, and received a D.D. there in 1900 and an honorary D.H.L. in 1925.

Enelow was rabbi of Temple Israel in Paducah, Kentucky, from 1898 to 1901, Temple Adath Israel in Louisville, Kentucky, from 1901 to 1912, and Temple Emanu-El in New York City, New York, from 1912 to 1934. He was vice-president of the Central Conference of American Rabbis from 1925 to 1927 and its president from 1927 to 1929. He helped establish chairs for Jewish Studies in Harvard University (with the aid of his friend Lucius Littauer) and in Columbia University (with the aid of Mrs. Nathan J. Miller). He wrote a number of books on Jewish religion, and had a private library of over 20,000 he willed to the Jewish Theological Seminary when he died.

During World War I, Enelow went to France as overseas commander and general field secretary of the National Jewish Welfare Board. He was also a member of the Army Education Corps during that time. He served on a number of committees of the Union of American Hebrew Congregations and the Central Conference of American Rabbis.

He died at sea of heart failure, on February 6, 1934, while on a cruise to the Mediterranean. He was never married. He was buried in Rosehill Cemetery in Chicago.

In the year prior to Enelow's death, he published a rabbinic work written in about the later end of the 4th-century CE, entitled Mishnat Rabbi Eli'ezer (aka The Thirty-two Hermeneutical Principles), a work heretofore preserved in manuscript form, and cited by the author of the Midrash HaGadol. The work is replete with English annotations.
