= Ignaz Grossmann =

Ignaz Grossmann (July 30, 1825 – March 19, 1897) was a Hungarian-born rabbi who ministered in Moravia, Croatia, and America.

== Life ==
Grossmann was born on July 30, 1825, in Trencsen, Hungary. Three of his sons, Louis Grossmann of Cincinnati, Ohio, Rudolph Grossman of New York City, New York, and Julius Grossmann of Ipolysagh, Hungary, were rabbis.

Grossmann attended the Pressburg Yeshiva. He served as rabbi of Koritschan, Moravia from 1863 to 1866 and of Warasdin, Croatia from 1866 to 1873. In the latter year, he immigrated to America and became rabbi of Congregation Beth Elohim in Brooklyn, New York. He then became rabbi of Congregation B'nai Abraham in Chicago, Illinois in 1876. He also served as rabbi in Kansas City, Missouri. He retired as rabbi when his wife died, at which point he began writing translations of the Talmud and Midrash that were published in the Deborah, which he was a frequent contributor to. He also wrote "Drei Predigten" in 1868, "Die Sprache der Wahrheit" in 1870, and "Miḳraot Ḳeṭannot" (a presentation on the 613 commandments) in 1892.

Grossmann died at his son Rudolph's home in New York City on March 19, 1897. His funeral was held in his son's congregation, Congregation Rodeph Sholom, and was officiated by Rabbi Kaufmann Kohler and Rabbi Joseph Silverman. His body was then sent to Detroit, Michigan to be buried, with Rabbi E. K. Fischer of Kalamazoo officiated the service. He was buried in Woodmere Cemetery next to his wife.
