= Peter Knobel =

American Reform rabbi, educator, and editor (1943–2019)

- Born: January 13, 1943; Newark, New Jersey, U.S.
- Died: August 20, 2019 (aged 76); Los Angeles, California, U.S.
- Resting place: Memorial Park Cemetery, Skokie, Illinois
- Education: Hebrew Union College-Jewish Institute of Religion; Yale University
- Occupations: Rabbi, educator, editor
- Spouse: Elaine Knobel
- Children: 2 sons

Peter Knobel (January 13, 1943 – August 20, 2019) was an American Reform rabbi, educator and editor. He was the rabbi of Beth Emet The Free Synagogue in Evanston, Illinois, for three decades.

== Biography ==
Knobel was ordained at the Hebrew Union College-Jewish Institute of Religion, and he earned a PhD from Yale University. He graduated from Hamilton College in Clinton, NY. He was the rabbi of Temple Emanu-El in Groton, Connecticut, from 1969 to 1980, followed by Beth Emet The Free Synagogue in Evanston, Illinois, from 1980 to 2010. After he became rabbi emeritus at Beth Emet, he was the interim senior rabbi at Temple Sholom in Chicago, Temple Judea in Coral Gables, Florida, and finally at the Temple Israel of Hollywood in Los Angeles in July–August 2019.

Knobel taught at the University of New Haven, the University of Connecticut, and the Spertus Institute for Jewish Learning and Leadership. He edited several books, including one about Rabbi Walter Jacob, and wrote many articles. He was the past president of the Central Conference of American Rabbis, the Chicago Board of Rabbis, and the Chicago Association of Reform Rabbis. He served on the boards of the American Jewish Committee; Association of Reform Zionists of America; the Union for Reform Judaism; Jewish United Fund of Metropolitan Chicago; and on the council of the Parliament of the World's Religions.

With his wife, Elaine, Knobel had two sons and six grandchildren. He died of a heart attack on August 20, 2019, in Los Angeles, and was buried at the Memorial Park Cemetery in Skokie, Illinois, on August 26, 2019.

== Works ==
- Hermann, Bennett M. (1984). Knobel, Peter S. (ed.). Gates of the Seasons: A Guide to the Jewish Year. New York: Central Conference of American Rabbis. ISBN 9780916694920. OCLC 854079620.
- Knobe, Peter S.; Staitman, Mark N., eds. (2000). An American Rabbinate: A Festschrift for Walter Jacob. Pittsburgh, Pennsylvania: Rodef Shalom Press. ISBN 9780929699110. OCLC 237814364.
- Knobel, Peter S., ed. (2013). Mishkan Moeid: A Guide to the Jewish Seasons. New York: Central Conference of American Rabbis. ISBN 9780881231779. OCLC 1051017738.
- Knobel, Peter S., ed. (2018). Navigating the Journey: The Essential Guide to the Jewish Lifecycle. New York: Central Conference of American Rabbis. ISBN 9780881232936. OCLC 1111664760.
