= Wilborn Temple First Church of God in Christ =

Pentecostal church and former synagogue, in Albany, New York, United States

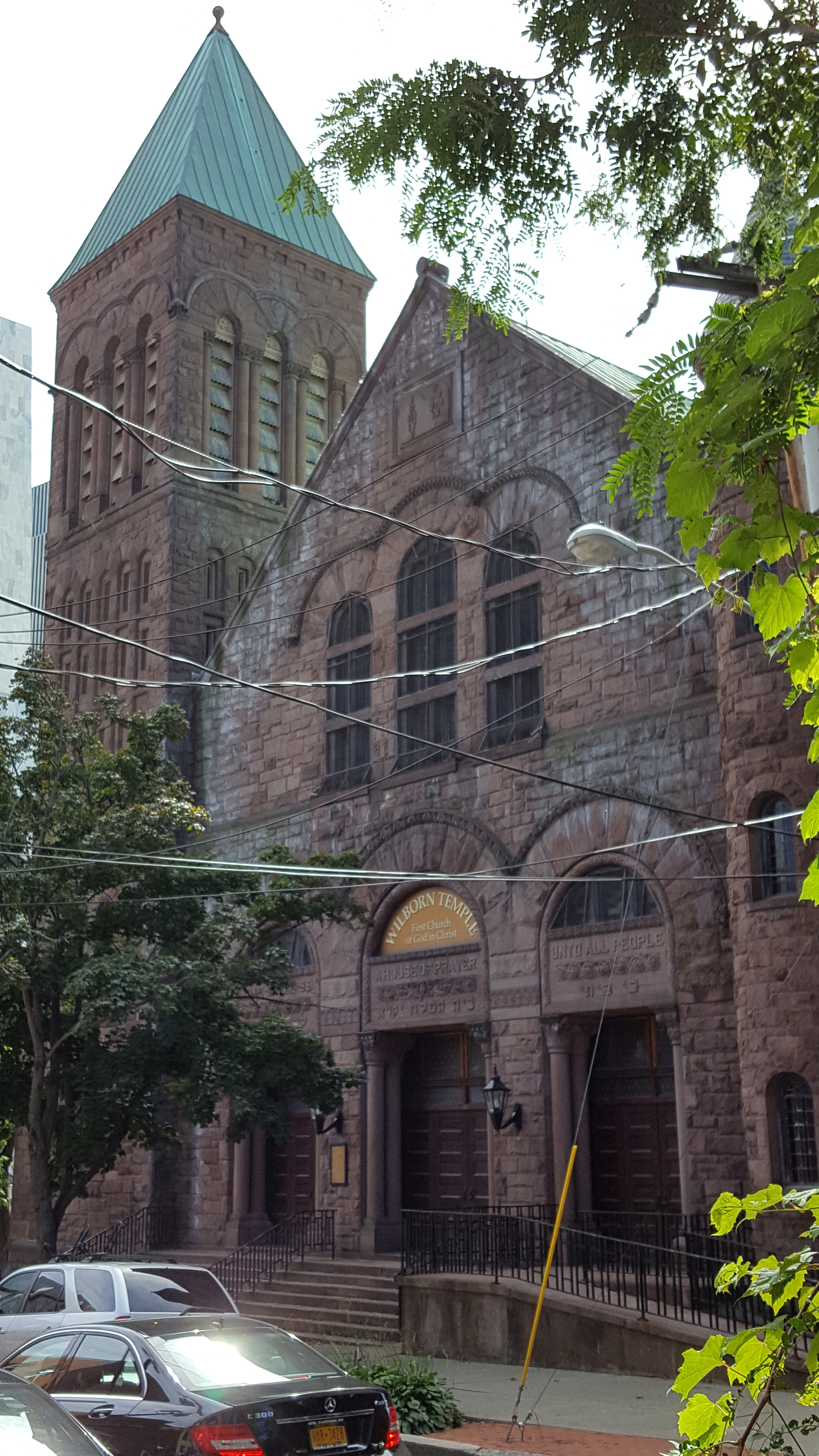
- The Wilborn Temple in September 2016
- Wilborn Temple First Church of God in Christ
- 42°39′8″N 73°45′42″W
- Address: 121 Jay Street, Albany, New York
- Country: United States
- Denomination: Pentecostalism
- Previous denomination: Judaism

History
- Status: Synagogue (1885–1957); Church (since 1957)

Architecture
- Architects: Isaac Perry; Adolph Fleischmann
- Architectural type: Synagogue architecture
- Style: Richardson Romanesque
- Years built: 1885

Wilborn Temple First Church of God in Christ Inc. is a Pentecostal church, located at 121 Jay Street, in Albany, New York, in the United States. The building was completed as a synagogue in 1885 and has been used as a church since 1957.

== History ==
Wilborn Temple was formed during the peak of the Black Migration from the South to the North of the country (1930s). At that time, Albany had only two prominent black churches, Israel African Methodist Episcopal and Morning Star Missionary Baptist.

The church congregation was formed in 1927 by Ms. Elsie Black and Mrs. Alice Charles Harmon. Under the leadership of Elder L. W. Parsons, the church moved to 79 Hamilton Street, which is remembered as Old 79. In 1940, after the death of Elder Parsons, Elder William M. Wilborn was appointed pastor. In 1957, the church acquired the Congregation Beth Emeth synagogue at 121 Jay Street. Elder Emmett H. Jeffress became pastor of Wilborn Temple in 1974 and the current pastor, Elder Solomon Dees was appointed pastor in 2007.

== Building ==
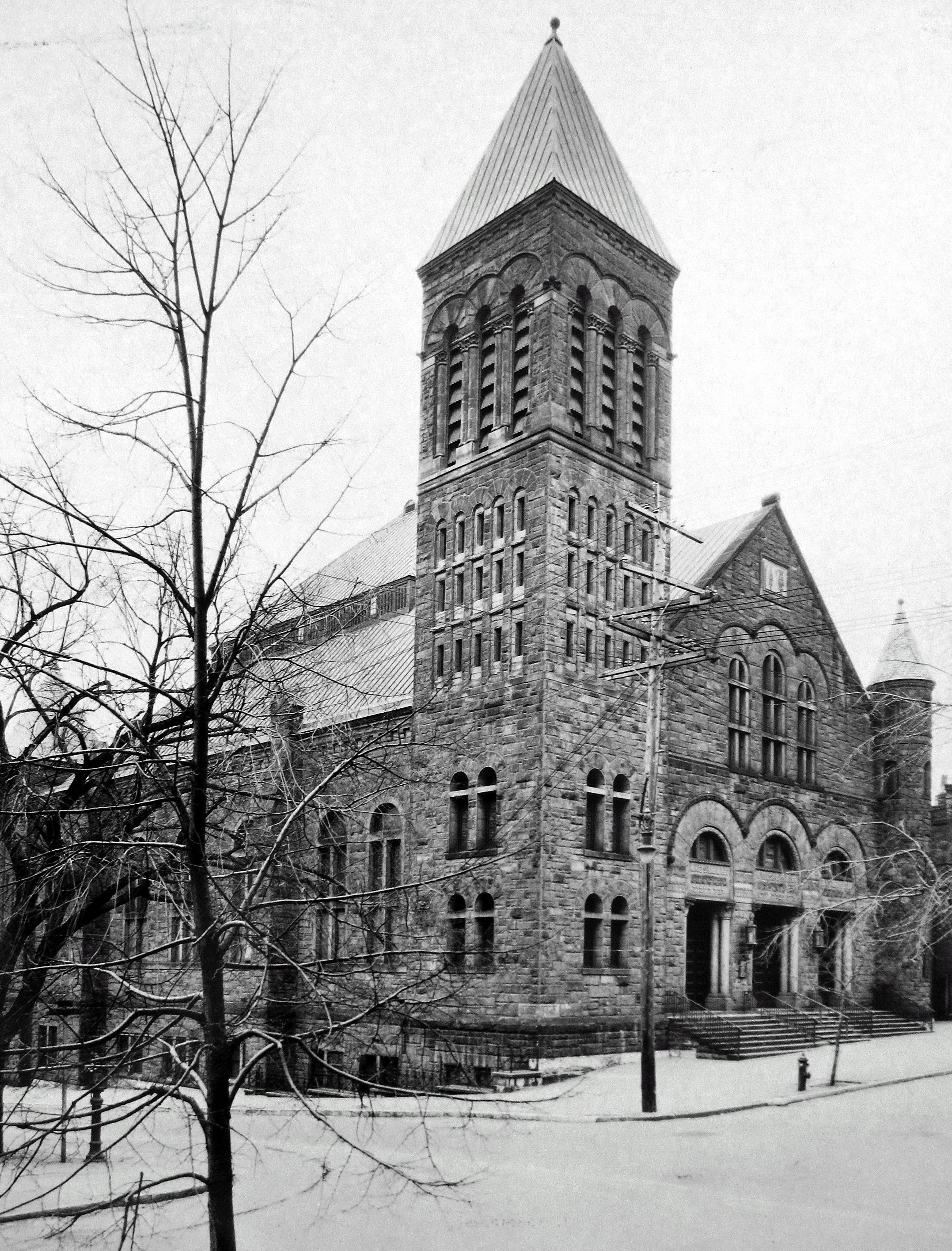
The synagogue of Congregation Beth Emeth, corner Lancaster and S. Swan streets, ca. 1930s. The First Church of God in Christ purchased the structure in 1957. Albany Institute.

Wilborn Temple is located on Jay, South Swan and Lancaster streets. When built in 1885, this stone Richardson Romanesque synagogue was Congregation Beth Emeth, the home of two Jewish congregations that were founded in the mid-19th century.

State architect Isaac Perry collaborated with a congregant, Adolph Fleischmann, on a design that echoed Albany's city hall, then newly built, in its rustication, hipped roof, massing around a corner tower and arched entryway with an inscription in English and Hebrew. Jews who had helped develop the surrounding blocks, later moved to the suburbs like other city residents, and in 1957 a new temple was built on Academy Road with the original stained glass.

The temple building on Jay Street was sold to a Christian church and became Wilborn Temple First Church of God in Christ.

Wilborn Temple is listed on the Center Square/Hudson-Park Historic District.

== Rapp Road Community Historic District ==
Beginning in the 1930s, under the leadership of Elder Louis Parsons, efforts were made to purchase land in the area in western Albany (known as the Pine Bush Preserve) to provide housing for those members new to the Albany South End and uncomfortable with its environment. The principal residents of the area were members of Albany's First Church of God in Christ. In September 2002, the Rapp Road Community was designated a New York State historic district and in January 2003 designated as a National Historic District. This was the first designation of its kind in New York State and possibly the nation.
