= Reform Judaism: A Centenary Perspective =

Reform Judaism: A Centenary Perspective is a statement of American Reform Judaism. The statement was adopted by the Central Conference of American Rabbis in San Francisco in 1976. The Centenary Perspective marked the 100th anniversary of the Union of American Hebrew Congregations (now called the Union for Reform Judaism) and the Hebrew Union College – Jewish Institute of Religion.

== The Platform ==
The Centenary Perspective emphasizes that God, the People of Israel, and Torah are core principles of Reform Judaism. Action rather than creed are emphasized as being of primary importance within Jewish life. Observance of Shabbat is encouraged. The statement describes Jewishness as a "union of faith and peoplehood", emphasizing the belief that Jews are an ethnic group with roots "in the ancient Near East." Describing Israel as the "ancient homeland" of the Jewish people, the statement emphasizes the importance of Jewish "religious and ethnic ties" to both the Land of Israel and the State of Israel. Aliyah is encouraged, but the statement also states that "Jewish life is possible in any land". The tension between universalism and particularism is acknowledged by the statement, but it offers no clear answer to the "conflict" between these two tendencies.

Rabbi Eugene Borowitz was the chair of the committee that wrote the Centenary Perspective.

== See also ==
- Columbus Platform
- Miami Platform
- New Pittsburgh Platform
- Pittsburgh Platform
