= Emanuel Congregation =

Reform synagogue in Chicago, Illinois, United States

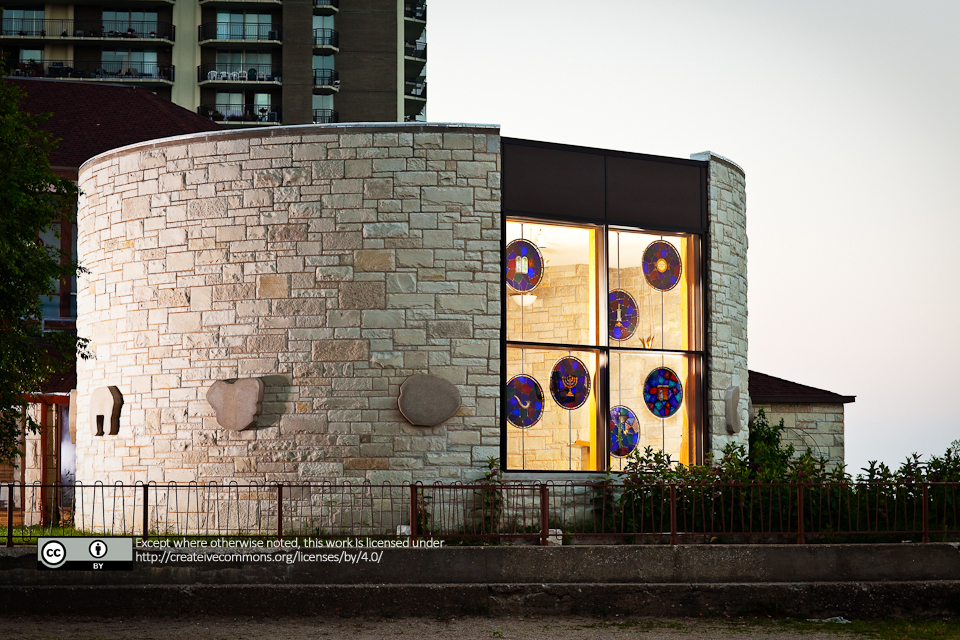
- The synagogue chapel in 2014

- Location in Chicago, Illinois

Religion
- Affiliation: Reform Judaism
- Ecclesiastical or organizational status: Synagogue
- Leadership: Rabbi Rachel Sabath Beit-Halachmi, Ph.D.
- Status: Active
- Notable artwork: Edgar Miller ark

Location
- Location: 5959 North Sheridan Road, Edgewater, Chicago, Illinois
- Country: United States
- Interactive map of Emanuel Congregation
- Coordinates: 41°59′26″N 87°39′17″W

Architecture
- Architects: Ross Barney + Jankowski (2001); Blender Architecture (2013)
- Type: Synagogue
- Style: Modernist
- Established: 1880 (as a congregation)
- Completed: 1896 (Buckingham Pl. #1); c. 1916 (Buckingham Pl. #2); 1955 (North Sheridan Rd.)
- Materials: Brick; limestone

Website
- emanuelcong.org

Emanuel Congregation (formerly Temple Emanuel) is a Reform Jewish congregation and synagogue located at 5959 North Sheridan Road, in the Edgewater neighborhood of Chicago, Illinois, in the United States. The congregation was founded in 1880.

== History ==
Fourteen German-speaking Jews founded Emanuel Congregation in 1880. The first president of Emanuel Congregation was Zacharias Sinzheimer. Originally founded on Orthodox ideology, Emanuel gradually shifted towards Reform Judaism by adopting Minhag America in 1889, choosing to worship with uncovered heads and finally uniting with Congregation Or Chadosh in 1894.

Another notable change in the early years of the congregation is its formal shift from speaking German to English in 1901.

Between 1880 and 1923, the congregation had only six rabbis, with Rabbi Felix A. Levy serving for forty-seven years. During Rabbi Levy's time, the congregation grew considerably, with over three hundred members at one point during the time he served. While there were times of higher membership, such as during Rabbi Levy's time, there were also multiple times when Emanuel Congregation's membership dwindled, which was often due to the northward movement of the members. In order to continue to serve their members, the congregation moved locations, such as in 1896 when membership was declining and the congregation moved to a lot on Buckingham Place near Halsted Street, where they built a new building. In 1916, the building at this location was badly damaged by a fire. After this, the building was rebuilt and rededicated.

== Current location ==
The congregation grew once again, which led to another location change in 1949 to a lot on Sheridan Road at Thorndale Avenue. The Modernist temple, designed as a brick and limestone fortress, was completed in 1954, and was dedicated the following year. Ross Barney + Jankowski completed stylistic remodelling in 2001, and in 2013, the building was opened up to views of Lake Michigan, designed by Blender Architecture. The synagogue features an Ark designed by Edgar Miller, stained-glass windows (including seven vintage windows, restored from a demolished Lawndale synagogue), movable translucent wall panels, and sails hung from the ceiling.

== See also ==
- History of the Jews in Chicago
