= Miami Platform =

The Miami Platform is the 1997 platform for American Reform Judaism. The platform was adopted by the Central Conference of American Rabbis on June 24, 1997. The Miami Platform clarified the relationship between American Reform Judaism and the Zionist movement.

== The Platform ==
The 1997 Miami Platform was held in recognition of the centenary of the first World Zionist Congress of August 29th, 1897. The Miami Platform was the first Reform platform dedicated to the issue of Zionism. The text of the platform asserts the American Reform movement's support for Israel and the Zionist movement, saying that "Medinat Yisrael serves uniquely as the spiritual and cultural focal point of world Jewry" and that the destinies of "Israeli and Diaspora Jewry" are dependent and responsible for one another. The importance of a Hebrew language education is emphasized as "indispensable", due to the strong links between the American Jewish and Israeli Jewish communities. The platform says that Israel must exist as a "pluralistic, democratic" Jewish state wherein "no religious interpretation of Judaism takes legal precedence over another." The platform was largely the work of Rabbi Ammiel Hirsch and Aron Hirt-Manheimer.

== See also ==
- Columbus Platform
- New Pittsburgh Platform
- Pittsburgh Platform
- Reform Judaism: A Centenary Perspective
