= Joseph Stolz =

American rabbi (1861–1941)

Joseph Stolz (November 3, 1861 – February 7, 1941) was an American rabbi who ministered in Chicago for most of his life.

== Life ==
Stolz was born on November 3, 1861, in Syracuse, New York, the son of David Stolz and Regina Strauss.

Stolz attended Syracuse public schools and prepared for Hebrew Union College under Rabbi Herman Birkenthal, the rabbi of Temple Society of Concord. He entered Hebrew Union College in Cincinnati, Ohio, in 1879. While there, he became influenced by Professor Solomon Eppinger and Dr. Moses Mielziner and would come to share their conservative thoughts. In 1882, he officiated in Birmingham, Alabama, during the High Holidays. He graduated from Hebrew Union College in 1884. He also graduated from the University of Cincinnati with a B.L. that year. He was part of the first graduating class of Hebrew Union College. He received a D.D. from Hebrew Union College in 1890, and in 1931 he received an honorary D.H.L. degree from there. Following his ordination, he worked as rabbi in B'nai Israel Temple in Little Rock, Arkansas, from 1884 to 1887. He then assisted Bernhard Felsenthal at Zion Temple in Chicago, Illinois, from 1887 to 1895. In 1895, when Chicago Jews were moving to the South Side, he was elected rabbi of Isaiah Temple. He served as rabbi there until 1929, when he retired and became rabbi emeritus. Concerned that Reform Judaism was closing itself off from middle-class Jews, he introduced a Sunday service in 1887 and believed that the synagogue, the Jewish community's cornerstone, should be a democratic institution.

Active in Chicago civic affairs, Stolz served on the Chicago Board of Education from 1899 to 1905 and on the Chicago Crime Commission from 1910 until his death. He served as president of the Central Conference of American Rabbis from 1905 to 1907, after which he served on its executive committee. He was also an executive committee member of the Union of American Hebrew Congregations and the American Jewish Committee, and served on the publication committee of the Jewish Publication Society of America. In 1897, he wrote Funeral Agenda of Jews. He was president of the Chicago Rabbinical Association from 1920 to 1925 and of the Chicago Federation of Synagogues.

In 1890, Stolz married Blanche A. Rauh of Cincinnati. Their children were Edna (wife of lawyer Joseph Brody of Des Moines, Iowa), Regina (wife of physician Harry Greenebaum of Chicago), and Leon (an editorial writer for the Chicago Tribune).

In 1937, Stolz fell and broke his hip, rendering him an invalid for the rest of his life. He died at home on February 7, 1941. Rabbi Morton Berman and Rabbi Felix A. Levy conducted his funeral at Temple Isaiah Israel.
