= Emil W. Leipziger =

American rabbi (1877–1963)

Emil William Leipziger (December 18, 1877 – March 11, 1963) was a Swedish-born American rabbi.

== Life ==
Leipziger was born on December 18, 1877, in Stockholm, Sweden, the son of Herman J. Leipziger and Hannah Edloff. He came to America in 1881.

In 1900, Leipziger graduated from the University of Cincinnati and was ordained a rabbi by Hebrew Union College. He served as rabbi of Temple Israel in Terre Haute, Indiana, from 1900 to 1913. He became associate rabbi of the Touro Synagogue in New Orleans, Louisiana, in the latter, serving under Rabbi Isaac Leucht. When Leucht died the following year, he became the new rabbi. Active in communal work, he was president of the Louisiana State Conference of Charities in 1916 and vice-president of the National Conference of Social Work in 1917. In 1925, he received a loving cup from the New Orleans Times Picayune in recognition of his work for the community chest. He organized the Jewish Welfare Fund of New Orleans and served as treasurer and director of the Hebrew Union College Alumni Association. He was president of the Central Conference of American Rabbis from 1939 to 1941. He retired as rabbi in 1948, after which he became rabbi emeritus.

Leipziger volunteered to be a chaplain in World War I, but he was never appointed due to the rapid end of the war. He wrote a book called "A Rabbi and His Flock." He was president of B'nai B'rith District #7. In 1901, he married Reta Jeannette Strouse. Their child was Eleanor Jeannette, wife of Leslie Moses.

Leipziger died at his daughter's home in Houston, Texas, on March 11, 1963. He was buried in Hebrew Rest Cemetery.
