= Wolfe Kelman =

American Conservative Rabbi

Rabbi Wolfe Kelman

Personal life
- Born: November 27, 1923 Vienna, Austria
- Died: June 26, 1990 (aged 66) New York, New York, United States
- Buried: Riverside Cemetery; Saddle Brook, New Jersey
- Spouse: Jacqueline (m. 1955–1990)
- Children: Naamah Kelman; Levi Kelman
- Parent: Rabbi Zvi Yehuda Kelman (father)
- Education: University of Toronto

Religious life
- Religion: Judaism
- Denomination: Conservative Judaism
- Profession: Adjunct professor Jewish Theological Seminary of America

Jewish leader
- Successor: Rabbi Joel Meyers
- Position: Director
- Organisation: Rabbinical Assembly
- Began: 1951
- Ended: 1989
- Yahrtzeit: November 1, 2001
- Residence: Manhattan, New York, New York

Wolfe Kelman (November 27, 1923 – June 26, 1990) was an Austrian-born American rabbi and leader in the Conservative Judaism in the United States who never led a congregation, serving for decades as a mentor to hundreds of rabbis in his role as the executive vice president of the Rabbinical Assembly, where he also prepared the initial steps for the rabbinic ordination of women in the Conservative movement.

== Early life and education ==
Kelman was born in 1923 in Vienna to Rabbi Zvi Yehuda Kelman, the scion of a line of Hasidic rabbis originally from Poland. He moved with his family to Toronto, Ontario, Canada as a child. His mother took on the responsibilities of leading the Jewish community after the death of his father when Kelman was a 13-year-old. His mother's assumption of the leadership role was one of the factors that led Kelman to "believe women could function as rabbis". He served with the Royal Canadian Air Force during World War II.

== Leadership in Conservative Judaism ==
Upon the completion of his military service, Kelman attended the Jewish Theological Seminary of America, where he received his rabbinic ordination. Eschewing a congregation and a pulpit, and at the prompting of Dr. Louis Finkelstein and Rabbi Abraham Joshua Heschel, he accepted a post at the Rabbinical Assembly in 1951. There he helped professionalize the Conservative rabbinate, adding educational retreats and ensuring that rabbis received compensation and benefits commensurate with their role. In the nearly four decades before his retirement in 1989, the number of Conservative rabbis quadrupled from 300 to 1,200 during a period when the Conservative movement grew together with the rise of suburban Jewish communities.

Kelman joined his mentor Rabbi Heschel during the Selma to Montgomery marches in 1965 with Dr. Martin Luther King Jr. Throughout his career, Kelman sought to build better connections between the branches of Judaism in the United States and between its Christians and Jews, as well as improving ties to the Jews of Israel. He did advance work with Rabbi Heschel preparing him for his 1964 meeting with Pope Paul VI in Vatican City. He fought against increasing intermarriage, receiving publicity for his outspoken criticism on religious grounds of the popular television show, Bridget Loves Bernie, which showcased a happily married Jewish man and Catholic woman. He called the show "an insult to some of the most sacred values of both the Jewish and Catholic religions."

In addition to his duties with the Conservative Assembly, Kelman was the head of the U.S. division of the World Jewish Congress starting in 1986.

== Death ==
A resident of Manhattan with an apartment on West End Avenue, Kelman died of melanoma at age 66 at the New York University Medical Center on June 26, 1990. He was survived by his wife, the former Jacqueline Levy, as well as two daughters, a son and, at that moment, six grandchildren. His son, Levi Weiman-Kelman is a reform rabbi in Jerusalem, and he founded the Progressive congregation Kol HaNeshama. His daughter Naamah Kelman-Ezrachi was the first woman to become a rabbi in Israel when she received rabbinic ordination from Rabbi Alfred Gottschalk of the Hebrew Union College, affiliated with the Reform Judaism movement.
