= Otto A. Rosalsky =

American lawyer

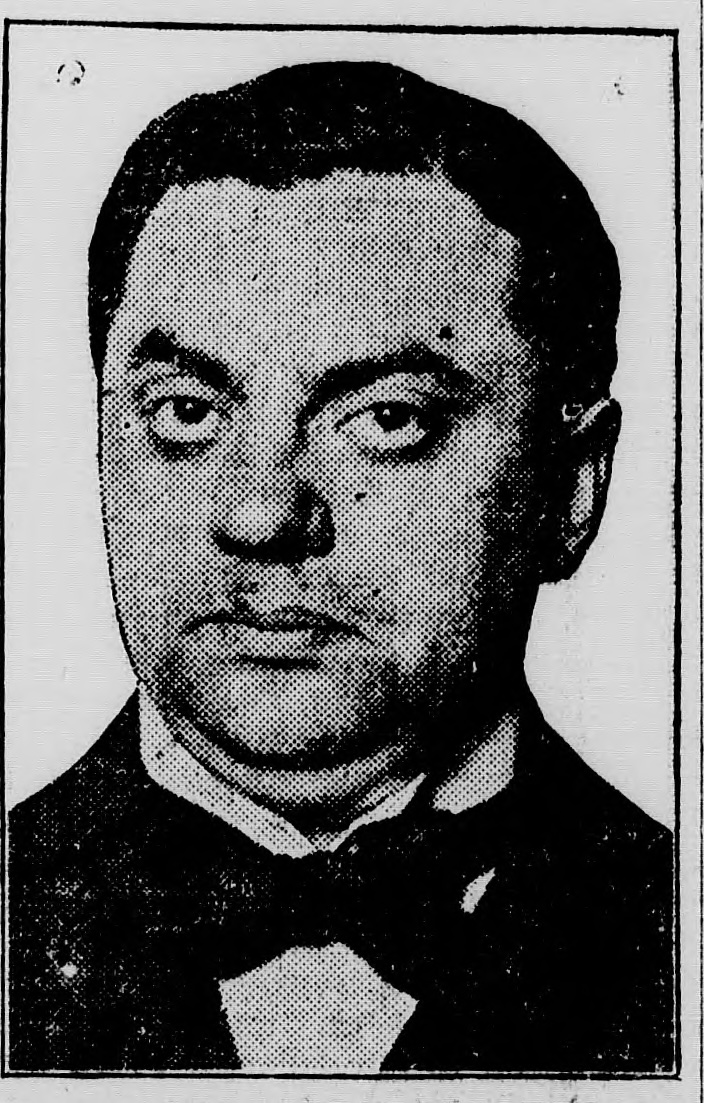

Otto Alfred Rosalsky (December 24, 1873 – May 11, 1936) was a Jewish-American lawyer and judge from New York.

== Life ==
Rosalsky was born on December 24, 1873, in New York City, New York, the son of Solomon Rosalsky and Yetta Weinberg. His brother was judge Joseph S. Rosalsky. His father was a butcher. He was born and raised on the Lower East Side on Allen Street, attended public school while taking private Hebrew lessons and studying in the Cooper Institute, and organizing and leading the Argosy Literary Society while still young.

Rosalsky began attending the New York University School of Law in 1892, graduating from there with an LL.B. in 1894. He was assistant district attorney from 1896 to 1897. While in that position, he became an associate of James W. Osborne and prosecuted a number of murder trials. He worked as a lawyer from 1898 to 1905 and was considered a leader in the criminal bar. He previously worked with Frank Moss in attacking criminal elements on Allen Street. Interested in Republican politics since 1892, he was president of the Alexander Kalisher Association, a Republican club in the Third Assembly District. His organization skills was recognized by Police Commissioner Murphy, who recommended him as a clerk to William Andrew Sutherland during the Lexow Committee. He was an alternate delegate to the 1904 Republican National Convention.

In 1905, Governor Frank W. Higgins appointed Rosalsky to fill a vacancy in the Court of General Sessions. Shortly afterwards, he unsuccessfully ran as a Republican to keep the judgeship. In 1906, he was reappointed to the Court to fill a vacancy, and in the November election that year he was elected to a full fourteen year term. He was re-elected to the Court in 1920 and 1934. As judge, he had a strict treatment of criminals that led two bombs to be sent to him (although he escaped injury both times) and numerous threats made against him by the Mafia and other criminal groups. He also introduced a number of reforms and innovations, like the probation system in criminal courts and the acceptance of fingerprints as evidence for identification. His concept of premeditation as something that could happen almost simultaneously with the deed instead of requiring a lapse of time became accepted precedent in criminal law all over the country.

An Orthodox Jew, Rosalsky was involved with a number of Jewish activities. He was vice-president of the committee that raised funds for Yeshiva College and served as a trustee of the college. On his 50th birthday, the Jewish Education Association raised a half-a-million dollar fund in honor of his service to Jewish youth. He was head of the New York Committee of the United Palestine Appeal and the Jewish Communal Survey of New York. He was also a member of the Federation of Jewish Philanthropic Societies of New York City, the Jewish Board of Guardians, Beth Israel Hospital, Sydenham Hospital, the People's Hospital, the Hebrew Sheltering and Guardian Society, the Home of the Daughters of Jacob, the Beth Abraham Home for Incurables, the Freemasons, and the Elks. He attended Ohab Zedek and Congregation Mishkan Israel Anshe Suwalk. Rosalsky's first wife, Bessie Simon, died in 1932. He married his second wife, Mamie, the widow of Municipal Court Justice Leonard A. Snitkin, in August 1935.

Rosalsky died in Mount Sinai Hospital on May 11, 1936, three days after undergoing an operation for a minor ailment. A thousand people and scores of city and state political leaders attended his funeral in the Jewish Center, including Mayor Fiorello La Guardia, Court of Appeals Judge Irving Lehman, Samuel Seabury, John F. Curry, Felix Warburg, Supreme Court Justice Ferdinand Pecora, former Mayor James J. Walker, Samuel S. Koenig, General Sessions Judge Morris Koenig, Kenneth F. Simpson, Appellate Court Justice Francis W. Martin, Aldermanic President Timothy J. Sullivan, Supreme Court Justice Bernard L. Shientag, James W. Gerard, George Gordon Battle, Borough President Samuel Levy, Special Sessions Court Chief Justice Frederic Kernochan, Albert Ottinger, General Sessions Judge James G. Wallace, Supreme Court Justice Julius Miller, Nathan Burkan, James J. Hines, and George Z. Medalie. In addition, ten thousand people stood outside of the Center on the streets. Rabbi Leo Jung delivered the eulogy. The funerary procession passed by the Grand Street Boys Association, where it was met the Association President Magistrate Jonah J. Goldstein. He was buried in Mount Judah Cemetery.
