= Congregation Beth Emeth =

Reform synagogue in New York, US

- Location in New York

Religion
- Affiliation: Reform Judaism
- Ecclesiastical or organisational status: Synagogue
- Status: Active

Location
- Location: 100 Academy Road, Albany, Albany County, New York 12208
- Country: United States
- Coordinates: 42°38′48″N 73°47′04″W

Architecture
- Architects: Adolph Fleischman (1887); Percival Goodman (1957)
- Type: Synagogue
- Established: 1885 (as a congregation)
- Completed: 1887 (Lancaster & S. Swan Sts.); 1957 (Academy Road)

Website
- cbealbany.org

Congregation Beth Emeth (transliterated from Hebrew as "House of Truth") is a Reform Jewish synagogue located at 100 Academy Road, in Albany, Albany County, New York, in the United States. Established in 1885, it is the fourth oldest Reform congregation in the United States.

== History ==
The congregation was formed in 1885 with the merger of a 'dwindling' Orthodox congregation, Anshe Emeth ("People of Truth") and a 'growing' Reform congregation, Beth El ("House of God"). Reform pioneer Rabbi Isaac Mayer Wise led Beth El from 1846 to 1850 where he conducted a day school which included a public school curriculum, religion & Hebrew. Due to tensions between more Orthodox congregants and the Rabbi, Anshe Emeth was created by Rabbi Wise supporters where he then led from 1850 to 1854 before relocating to Cincinnati.

In 1897 the newly merged congregation elected Dr. Alexander Lyons as the new Rabbi.

Martin A. Meyer served as rabbi from 1903 to 1906, and Samuel H. Goldenson served as rabbi from 1907 to 1918. After Rabbi Samuel the congregation was led by Rabbi Eli Mayer, Rabbi Marius Ranson, Rabbi Bernard J. Bamberger, Rabbi Samuel Wolk, Rabbi Alvin S. Roth, Rabbi Bernard H. Bloom, Rabbi Martin I. Silverman, Rabbi Scott L. Shpeen, and most recently Rabbi Greg Weitzman.

== Architecture ==
The congregation's 1887 building, located at Lancaster and South Swan Streets in Albany, is considered to be one of the few surviving 19th-century synagogues in the United States. The architect was Adolph Fleischman, with the help from Isaac Perry. The building is in Richardson Romanesque style. As of 1993 it was the home of the Wilborn Temple First Church of God in Christ.

In June 1953 the building committee ratified the decision to move from Lancaster and Swan to 17 acres (6.9 ha) up town. The congregation's 1957 building was designed by Percival Goodman.
