= Gustav Gottheil =

American rabbi (1827–1903)

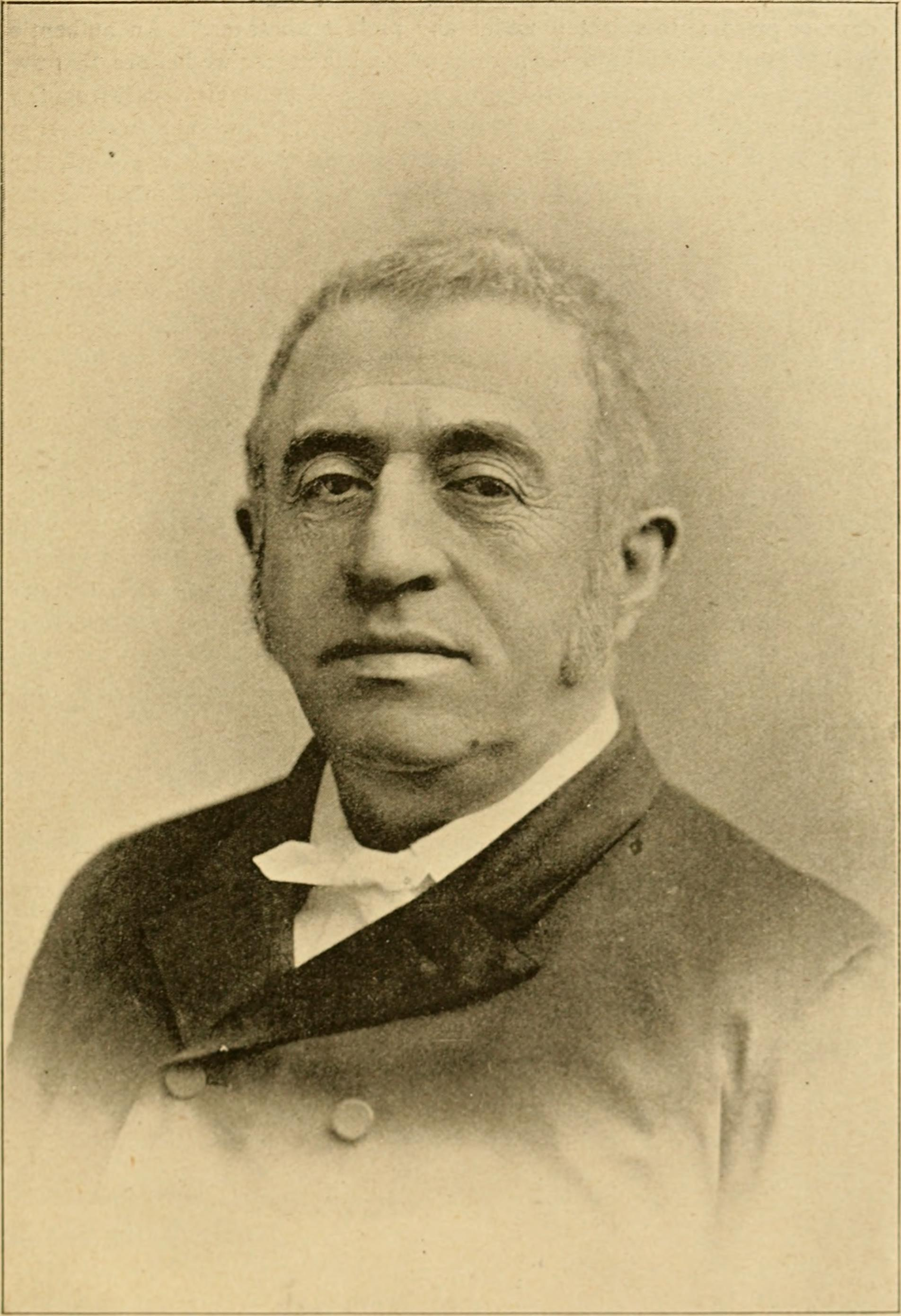
Rabbi G. Gottheil

Gustav Gottheil (May 28, 1827, Pinne/Pniewy, Grand Duchy of Posen, Prussia – April 15, 1903, New York City) was a Prussian-born American rabbi. Gottheil eventually became one of the most influential, well-known and controversial Reform Jewish leaders of his time. He was the father of Richard Gottheil.

== Early life ==
He was rabbinical educated in Poland (Posen) under Rabbi Solomon Plessner, and later continued his studies at the universities of Berlin and Jena (Ph.D.), receiving in the meanwhile his "hattarat hora'ah" in the former city from Samuel Holdheim, whose assistant he became (1855). He also studied under Zunz and Moritz Steinschneider. In 1860 he set out from the Berliner Reformgemeinde to labor for Reform Judaism in new fields.

== Adult life ==
In 1860 he received a call from the Reform Jews of Manchester, England; he went there as rabbi for the Manchester Congregation of British Jews and remained for 13 years. During this time he was connected with the faculty of Owens College as a teacher of the German language. Two of his most noteworthy sermons preached in Manchester were on the slavery question, attacking those who had declared the institution to be sanctioned by Mosaic law. Dr. Gottheil was a member of the Synod of Leipsic in 1871, which took a decided stand on the question of Reform. He left Manchester in 1873, having been elected to succeed the Rev. J. K. Gutheim as assistant to Dr. Samuel Adler, the senior rabbi of Temple Emanu-El, New York City. When Adler retired about eighteen months later, Gottheil succeeded him. On taking charge he reorganized the religious school, and assisted in founding a theological school where preliminary training might be imparted to future candidates for the rabbinate. He prepared in 1886 the first Jewish hymn-book printed in America (with music in a separate volume by A. Davis); it contains not only traditional Jewish hymns, but also others of Christian origin, and upon it was based the Union Hymnal, which has since been generally adopted by the Reform congregations in the United States. In 1889 he started the first Sisterhood of Personal Service, a philanthropic organization affiliated with Temple Emanu-El which served as a model for similar institutions elsewhere. Dr. Gottheil was the founder of the Association of Eastern Rabbis, and when it was assimilated with the Central Conference of American Rabbis in 1890, he took an active part in its deliberations. He was one of the founders and the president of the (American) Jewish Publication Society, vice-president of the Federation of American Zionists, chairman of the Revision Committee for the Union Prayer Book, and one of the governors of the Hebrew Union College, in Cincinnati.

Dr. Gottheil's sympathies and interests were broadly universalist, as evidenced by his connection with various non-Jewish institutions as well as by many of his sermons and writings. He was one of the founders of the New York State Conference of Religions, assisting in the editing of its "Book of Common Prayers"; and a founder and for many years vice-president of the Nineteenth Century Club. In 1893 Gottheil was one of the representatives of the Jews at the Parliament of Religions, held in Chicago during the World Columbian Exposition.

== Zionist affiliation ==
Unlike most Reform Jews of the time, Rabbi Gottheil was a supporter of Zionism and attended the First Zionist Congress in Basle, Switzerland. He was the most prominent American Jew to respond to Theodor Herzl's call and served as vice-president of the newly created Federation of American Zionists, a forerunner of the Zionist Organization of America. Rabbi Gottheil's belief was an act of faith, but it brought condemnation and vilification upon him from both the American Reform community and the American Orthodox community. American Reform Judaism viewed the struggling birth of Zionism as a betrayal of loyalty to America; Zionism, they said, was unstable, and it tasted bitterly of the dangerous, ancient Anti-Semitic accusations of dual loyalty. It threatened the position of the Jews in the new Zion of America. American Orthodox Judaism equally reviled the infant Zionist movement. Zionism, they felt, was a betrayal of faith in God's ultimate promise of redemption. To the Orthodox, it denied the coming of the Messiah.

== Literary works ==
He published "Sarah"; and "Sun and Shield" (New York, 1896), a survey of Judaism as he saw it. Essays by Dr. Gottheil have appeared in various periodicals and collections.

He was retired as rabbi emeritus of Temple Emanu-El in October, 1899. In honor of his 75th birthday a "Gustav Gottheil Lectureship in Semitic Languages" was founded at Columbia University.
