= Felix A. Levy =

Jewish-American rabbi (1884–1963)

Felix Alexander Levy (October 20, 1884 – June 16, 1963) was an American rabbi who mostly ministered in Chicago, Illinois.

== Life ==
Levy was born on October 20, 1884, in New York City, New York, the son of Alexander Levy and Catherine Bergdoll. His parents were from Alsace–Lorraine.

Levy graduated from the College of the City of New York with an A.B. in 1904. He then took post-graduate courses at Columbia University and the Jewish Theological Seminary from 1904 to 1905. He later went to Hebrew Union College, where he was ordained a rabbi in 1907 and received an honorary D.D. degree in 1939, and the University of Chicago, where he received a Ph.D. in 1917. He served as rabbi of Temple B'rith Kodesh in Rochester, New York, from 1907 to 1908. In the latter year, he became rabbi of Emanuel Congregation in Chicago, Illinois. Active in Jewish religious and educational affairs, he was a lecturer for the Jewish Chautauqua Society and an associate editor of B'nai B'rith News. From 1917 to 1918, he was in France as a member of the Jewish Welfare Board. He was a board of governors member of Hebrew Union College, chairman of the board of the College of Jewish Studies, and a member of the board of Jewish education. He was also an executive board member of the Zionist Organization of America, president of the Liberal Ministers' Association, and vice-president of the League Against War and Fascism. He wrote several books and was a contributor to The Reform Advocate, B'nai B'rith News, Hebrew Union College Monthly, and The Sentinel.

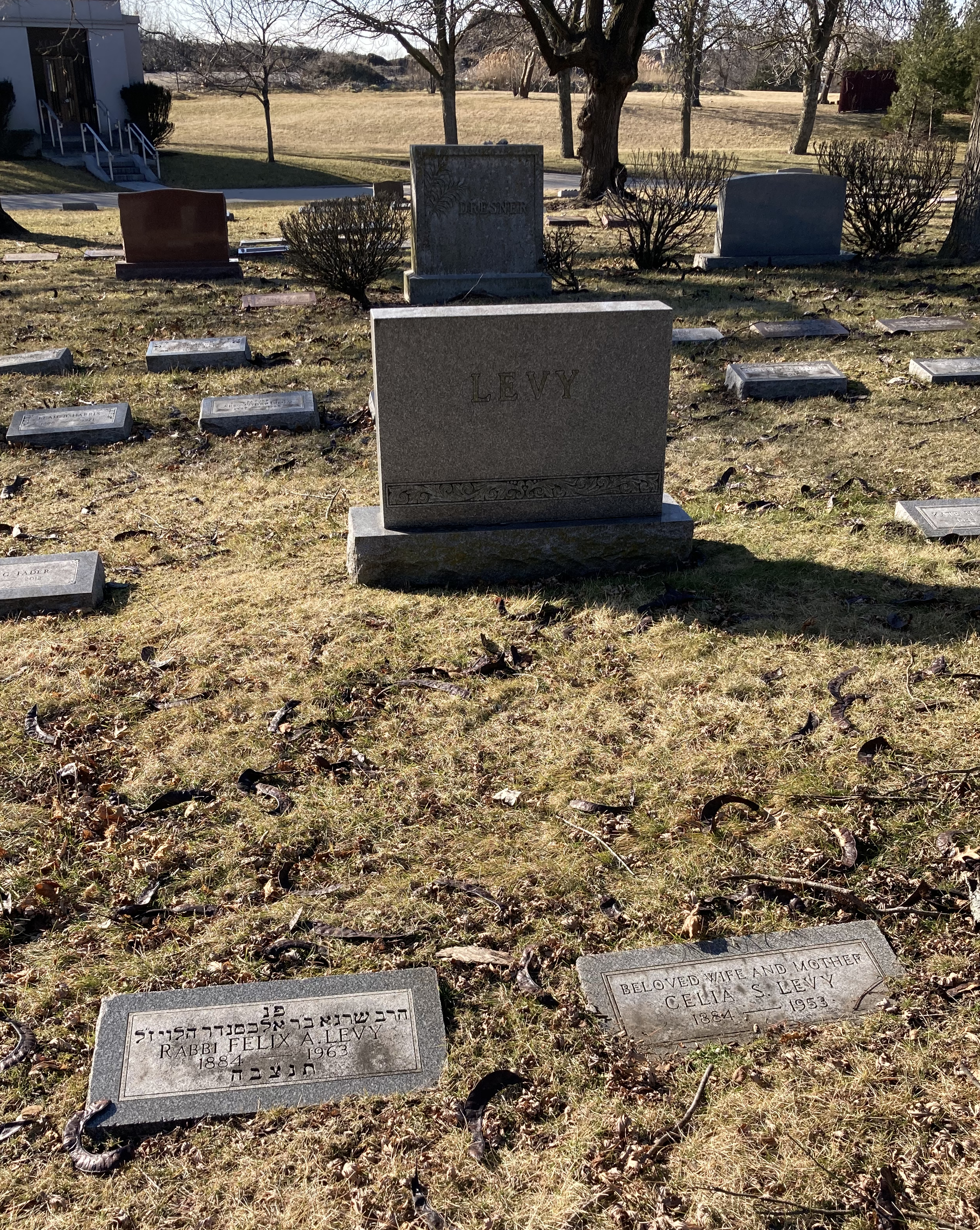
Levy's grave at Rosehill Cemetery

Levy influenced his colleagues to modify Reform Judaism's attitudes towards halakha and Jewish identity. He served as president of the Central Conference of American Rabbis from 1935 to 1937, and as president he had the Conference adopt the 1937 Columbus Platform to embody his ideas. He retired as rabbi of Emanuel Congregation in 1955, after which he served as editor of Judaism and dean of the academy for Higher Jewish Learning. A selection of his papers and sermons were published in S.D. Temkin's His Own Torah in 1969. He was an executive board member of the Jewish Publication Society of America.

In 1910, Levy married Celia Schanfarber. Their children were Marjory, Suzanne, Katherine (who was dead by 1947), and Jacqueline. His son-in-law was Rabbi Wolfe Kelman. His granddaughter is Rabbi Naamah Kelman,former dean of Hebrew Union College Jerusalem Campus, and his grandson is Rabbi Levi Weiman-Kelman, Rabbi Emeritus of Kol Haneshamah Congregation in Jerusalem. His great grandchildren include Dr. Zohar Weiman-Kelman, a scholar of queer theory and the author of Queer Expectations: A Genealogy of Jewish Women's Poetry; and Rabbi Leora Ezrachi-Vered, the 100th Reform rabbi ordained in Israel.

Levy died from a heart attack at his home in New York City on June 16, 1963. He was buried in Rosehill Cemetery.
