= Temple Israel (Paducah, Kentucky) =

Reform Jewish congregation and synagogue

- Location in Kentucky

Religion
- Affiliation: Reform Judaism
- Ecclesiastical or organizational status: Synagogue
- Leadership: Lay-led
- Status: Active

Location
- Location: 330 Joe Clifton Drive, Paducah, Kentucky
- Country: United States
- Interactive map of Temple Israel
- Coordinates: 37°4′33″N 88°37′56″W

Architecture
- Architects: Brinton B. Davis (1893); Pepinsky, Grau, Shroud, and Shorr (1963)
- Type: Synagogue
- Style: Moorish Revival (1893)
- Established: 1871 (as a congregation)
- Completed: 1871 (South Fifth); 1893 (Broadway); 1963 (Joe Clifton Dr.)
- Demolished: 1963 (Broadway)

Specifications
- Dome: One (Joe Clifton Dr.)
- Minaret: Two (Broadway)

Website
- templeisraelky.com

Temple Israel is a Reform Jewish congregation and synagogue located at 330 Joe Clifton Drive, in Paducah, Kentucky, in the United States.

Membership is a mix of families that have lived in Paducah for several generations, as well as those arriving in the area more recently. As of 2017, the synagogue was home to a small congregation of 32 families. Owing to the relatively small size of the congregation, Temple Israel does not have a permanent rabbi, yet has been supported by student rabbis from Hebrew Union College since 1988. Members of the congregation are affiliated with Reform, Conservative, and Orthodox practises and beliefs.

== History ==
The community was founded in 1864 as the Paducha Chevra Yeshrun Burial Society, and the congregation was chartered in 1871 as Kehillah Kodesh Bene Yeshurun ("Holy Community of the People of Righteousness") when it established its first synagogue, on South Fifth Street. (Note: Historical Marker states South Fifth Street, yet Encyclopedia of Southern Jewish Life states Chestnut Street. Weisbach clarifies that Chestnut became South Fifth Street (no date given re the change of name).) In 1873 it became a charter member of the Union of American Hebrew Congregations.

Paducah's elaborate, Moorish Revival-style synagogue, designed by Brinton B. Davis, was built in 1893 on the corner of Broadway and 7th Street. Davis later designed the original buildings of Western Kentucky University. The synagogue building featured a central tower and a pair of minarets, all three topped with large onion domes (these domes were removed in the early 1930s). There was an oriel window on the front of the tower, and three tiers of horseshoe windows. The front entrance featured a tripartite, columned, horseshoe-arched doorway topped by a tripartite tier of horseshoe windows. In 1893, the congregation changed its name from Bene Yeshurum to Temple Israel. The Broadway synagogue building was demolished in 1963.

The current synagogue building, dedicated in May 1963, is at the corner of Madison and Joe Clifton Drive, designed by Cincinnati-based architects, Pepinsky, Grau, Shroud, and Shorr.

According to the stone at its entrance, the Temple Israel Cemetery was established in 1859. It is located on Lone Oak Road, adjacent to Mt. Kenton Cemetery.

In 2004, the synagogue building was attacked by antisemitic activists.
