= Joseph S. Rosalsky =

American lawyer

Joseph Samuel Rosalsky (August 14, 1877 – September 3, 1937) was a Jewish-American lawyer and judge from New York.

== Life ==
Rosalsky was born on August 14, 1877, in New York City, New York, the son of Solomon Rosalsky and Yetta Weinberg and younger brother of judge Otto A. Rosalsky. He attended public school and the College of the City of New York.

Rosalsky graduated from the New York University School of Law with an LL.B. in 1899. He then became his brother Otto's law partner from 1899 to 1906. He was deputy attorney general from 1905 to 1906. He then practiced law with Abraham Levy from 1909 to 1910, after which he worked in a private law practice. In 1927, he was elected Justice of the Municipal Court, 5th District, New York City. He was also appointed Referee by the New York Supreme Court for a number of important cases, including an investigation of profiteering and intimidation in the New York City poultry industry. He declined a renomination to the Municipal Court in 1937, although he died before the election.

Rosalsky served as a member of the New York County Lawyers' Association Committee on Practice and Procedure in the Municipal Court from 1923 to 1924. He was also a member of the New York State Bar Association, the New York Criminal Bar Association, the Jewish Center, and the Grand Street Boys Association. In 1927, he married Laura V. Ernest.

Rosalsky died at home on September 3, 1937. He was buried in Mount Judah Cemetery in Queens.
