= Richard N. Levy =

American Reform rabbi (1937–2019)

Richard N. Levy (1937–2019) was an American Reform rabbi. He was involved in the rabbis' protest during the St. Augustine movement for civil rights. Among other positions, he was the Reform rabbi at the University of California, Los Angeles's Hillel, the Director of the School of Rabbinic Studies at Hebrew Union College's Los Angeles campus, and President of the Central Conference of American Rabbis. He earned his BA from Harvard College.
