= James G. Heller =

American rabbi and composer (1892–1971)

James Gutheim Heller
- Born: January 4, 1892; New Orleans, Louisiana, U.S.
- Died: December 19, 1971 (aged 79); Vernon Convalescent Center, Ohio, U.S.
- Education: Tulane University; University of Cincinnati; Hebrew Union College
- Occupations: Rabbi, composer, author
- Years active: 1916–1971
- Notable work: String quartet Aquatints; liturgical compositions; biography of Isaac Mayer Wise
- Spouses: Jean Bettmann (m. 1917); Helen R. Bettman (m. 1952)
- Children: Cecile L., Claire J., Joan H.

James Gutheim Heller (January 4, 1892 – December 19, 1971) was an American Reform rabbi, composer, and author who became a significant figure in 20th-century Jewish religious and communal life. Ordained at Hebrew Union College in 1916, he served congregations across the United States, most notably the Isaac M. Wise Temple in Cincinnati, and was active in the Central Conference of American Rabbis, serving as its president from 1941 to 1943. A committed Zionist, he later led the Labor Zionist Organization of America. Heller was also an accomplished musicologist and composer, producing liturgical and instrumental works and teaching at the Cincinnati Conservatory of Music.

== Life ==
Heller was born on January 4, 1892, in New Orleans, Louisiana, the son of Rabbi Maximilian Heller and Ida Marks.

Heller graduated from Tulane University with a B.A. in 1912 and from the University of Cincinnati with an M.A. in 1914. He was ordained a rabbi at Hebrew Union College in Cincinnati, Ohio, in 1916. He served as assistant rabbi at Congregation Keneseth Israel in Philadelphia, Pennsylvania, from 1916 to 1919 and as rabbi at Bene Israel Temple in Little Rock, Arkansas, from 1919 to 1920. He became rabbi at Isaac M. Wise Temple in Cincinnati in 1920. He delivered the Founder's Day address at Hebrew Union College in 1935, and in 1937 he became a member of its board of governors. An active member of the Central Conference of American Rabbis (CCAR), he served as vice-chairman of the Social Justice Commission, chairman of the Committee on Synagogue Music from 1937 to 1940, and vice-president from 1939 to 1941. He was elected the CCAR's president in 1941. He served as president until 1943. In the 1942 CCAR convention, he helped secure the adoption of a resolution that favored the creation of a Jewish division to fight in World War II, which led the anti-Zionist parts of the Reform movement to create the American Council for Judaism. During World War I, he served as an army chaplain.

Following the end of World War II, President Harry S. Truman chose him to serve with a select group of clergy to tour Europe and report on the status of post-war refugees. He was president of the Labor Zionist Organization of America, chairman of the United Jewish Appeal in 1945, and an executive committee member of the Union of American Hebrew Congregations. He retired as rabbi of the Isaac M. Wise Temple in 1952, at which point he became executive director of the Development Corporation of Israel. He wrote a history of the Temple in 1942 and a biography on Isaac Mayer Wise in 1965. He was also a talented musician and composer. In 1935, he was appointed professor of musicology at the Cincinnati Conservatory of Music, from which he previously received a Mus.D. degree. He composed a large number of works for various instrumental and vocal ensembles, including four solo services for Shabbat services. In 1929, he was awarded a prize from the Society for Publication of American Music for his string quartet "Aquatints." He previously studied music in New Orleans and Cincinnati, including under Edgar S. Kelley. He wrote program notes for the Cincinnati Symphony from 1924 to 1941.

Heller was a member of the Cincinnati Board of Education from 1935 to 1939, a director of the Hamilton County Board of the YMCA from 1934 to 1942, executive committee member and vice-president of the Zionist Organization of America, and a member of Phi Beta Kappa. In 1917, he married Jean Bettmann. Their children were Cecile L., Claire J., and Joan H. He married his second wife, Helen R. Bettman, in 1952.

Heller died at Vernon Convalescent Center on December 19, 1971. Rabbi Samuel Sandmel, a faculty member of Hebrew Union College, officiated the funeral service at the Weil Funeral Home. He was cremated at Hillside Chapel.
