= Columbus Platform =

1937 platform for American Reform Judaism

The Columbus Platform, officially known as The Guiding Principles of Reform Judaism, is the 1937 platform for American Reform Judaism adopted by the Central Conference of American Rabbis. The Columbus Platform was the first Reform platform to assert Reform Judaism's support for the Zionist movement, a repudiation of the anti-Zionism of the earlier Pittsburgh Platform. The platform also embraced aspects of traditional Judaism that the Reform movement had previously rejected.

== The Platform ==
The 1937 Columbus Platform was brought about by a shift in thinking by both Reform rabbis and Reform lay people. The rise of Nazism in Germany also created a sense of urgency for the Reform movement to reformulate their stance on Zionism. The 1885 Pittsburgh Platform repudiated Zionism, asserting that Jews are a religious community and not a nation, and upholding Reform Judaism as a religion with universal principles and little regard for religious ritual. The Columbus Platform endorsed Zionism, as well as the value of the particularism inherent in observing Shabbat and Jewish holidays.

The immigration of Eastern European Jews during the late 1800s and early 1900s had a profound influence on the Reform movement. While earlier German Jewish immigrants were more acculturated, the new wave of Eastern European Jews tended to be more traditional in their observance.

The 1937 Columbus Platform was largely the work of Samuel S. Cohon.

== See also ==
- Miami Platform
- New Pittsburgh Platform
- Pittsburgh Platform
- Reform Judaism: A Centenary Perspective
