= Pittsburgh Platform =

1885 document in Reform Judaism

The Pittsburgh Platform is a pivotal 1885 document in the history of the American Reform Movement in Judaism that called for Jews to adopt a modern approach to the practice of their faith. While it was never formally adopted by the Union of American Hebrew Congregations (UAHC) or the Central Conference of American Rabbis founded four years after its release, and several rabbis who remained associated with Reform in its wake attempted to distance themselves from it, the platform exerted great influence over the movement throughout the next fifty years, and still influences some Reform Jews who hold classicist views to this day.

== The Platform ==
The most important principles of Judaism as practiced by the largest Jewish denomination in the United States were laid out in eight concise paragraphs:

1. We recognize in every religion an attempt to grasp the Infinite, and in every mode, source or book of revelation held sacred in any religious system the consciousness of the indwelling of God in man. We hold that Judaism presents the highest conception of the God-idea as taught in our Holy Scriptures and developed and spiritualized by the Jewish teachers, in accordance with the moral and philosophical progress of their respective ages. We maintain that Judaism preserved and defended midst continual struggles and trials and under enforced isolation, this God-idea as the central religious truth for the human race.
2. We recognize in the Bible the record of the consecration of the Jewish people to its mission as the priest of the one God, and value it as the most potent instrument of religious and moral instruction. We hold that the modern discoveries of scientific researches in the domain of nature and history are not antagonistic to the doctrines of Judaism, the Bible reflecting the primitive ideas of its own age, and at times clothing its conception of divine Providence and Justice dealing with men in miraculous narratives.
3. We recognize in the Mosaic legislation a system of training the Jewish people for its mission during its national life in Palestine, and today we accept as binding only its moral laws, and maintain only such ceremonies as elevate and sanctify our lives, but reject all such as are not adapted to the views and habits of modern civilization.
4. We hold that all such Mosaic and rabbinical laws as regulate diet, priestly purity, and dress originated in ages and under the influence of ideas entirely foreign to our present mental and spiritual state. They fail to impress the modern Jew with a spirit of priestly holiness; their observance in our days is apt rather to obstruct than to further modern spiritual elevation.
5. We recognize, in the modern era of universal culture of heart and intellect, the approaching of the realization of Israel's great Messianic hope for the establishment of the kingdom of truth, justice, and peace among all men. We consider ourselves no longer a nation, but a religious community, and therefore expect neither a return to Palestine, nor a sacrificial worship under the sons of Aaron, nor the restoration of any of the laws concerning the Jewish state.
6. We recognize in Judaism a progressive religion, ever striving to be in accord with the postulates of reason. We are convinced of the utmost necessity of preserving the historical identity with our great past. Christianity and Islam, being daughter religions of Judaism, we appreciate their providential mission, to aid in the spreading of monotheistic and moral truth. We acknowledge that the spirit of broad humanity of our age is our ally in the fulfillment of our mission, and therefore we extend the hand of fellowship to all who cooperate with us in the establishment of the reign of truth and righteousness among men.
7. We reassert the doctrine of Judaism that the soul is immortal, grounding the belief on the divine nature of human spirit, which forever finds bliss in righteousness and misery in wickedness. We reject as ideas not rooted in Judaism, the beliefs both in bodily resurrection and in Gehenna and Eden (Hell and Paradise) as abodes for everlasting punishment and reward.
8. In full accordance with the spirit of the Mosaic legislation, which strives to regulate the relations between rich and poor, we deem it our duty to participate in the great task of modern times, to solve, on the basis of justice and righteousness, the problems presented by the contrasts and evils of the present organization of society.

== Historical context ==
This founding document of what has come to be called "Classical Reform" ideology was the culmination of a meeting of Reform rabbis from November 16–19, 1885, at the Concordia Club in Pittsburgh, Pennsylvania. It explicitly calls for a rejection of those laws which have a ritual, rather than moral, basis. An example of a ritual rejected by the Pittsburgh Platform is kashrut, or the observance of Jewish dietary laws. These ritual laws were seen as detracting from Jewish life in the modern era by placing undue emphasis on ritual, rather than ethical considerations.

The platform affirms God's existence, and recognized a universal desire in all religions to experience "the indwelling of God in man". In this vein, the Pittsburgh Platform also calls for a recognition of the inherent worth of Christianity and Islam, although it still holds that Judaism was the "highest conception of the God-idea."

Instead of a nation, the Pittsburgh Platform defines Jews in the modern world as a religious community within their pluralistic nations. For this reason, there was an explicit rejection of Zionism in the form that maintained that Jews were "in exile" anywhere except in what is now Israel and should all move to Israel as soon as possible; that version of Zionism was viewed as completely inapplicable to American Jews because they were at home in America and to other communities of Jews in free countries around the world. The platform seems to acknowledge the concept of Jewish chosenness accepting in the Bible "the consecration of the Jewish people to its mission as the priest of the one God."

The form of Judaism practiced by Reform Jews contrasted radically with the traditional and historic practices of Lithuanian, Hasidic, Sephardic, and Mizrahi Jews. Traditional Jewish leaders teach and practice a Judaism celebrating historic practices including specific gender roles in prayer and ritual, embracing distinct Jewish clothing styles and customs, using Hebrew in religious services, speaking Jewish languages (Yiddish, Ladino, Judeo-Arabaic), and minimizing social fraternalization with non-Jews. Among the most vocal advocates for Jewish life and practice was Moshe Sofer, also called the Hatam Sofer (1762-1839), who led a prestigious seminary in Bratislava. The cornerstone of his position is that "modification of any kind and in any degree of what had long been established could not fail to be incompatible with halakha [Orthodox religious law] and that the rule was absolute and all-embracing. There could be no question of drawing distinctions between greater and lesser matters, between greater and lesser precepts and injunctions. Innovation, whatever its form and context, was unacceptable." For mainstream orthodox Jews, the codification of Jewish law in the 16th century by Joseph Caro, called the Shulchan Aruch, is the "ultimate criterion" by which orthodox practice is measured. For the Reformers, this position was seen as contributing to stagnation in Judaism.

The Pittsburgh Platform helped shape the future of American Reform Judaism by calling for American Jews to not focus on traditional customs and practices but instead on ethical living (rather than custom and ritual) and to engage in acts of social justice as taught by the prophets of the Hebrew Bible. Today this principle, among others, is maintained by the Reform Movement through their commitment to what is sometimes called Tikkun Olam (the healing of the world).

There were many early leaders of the "Classical Reform" ideology, including Rabbi Kaufmann Kohler (who presided over the Hebrew Union College), Rabbi Isaac Mayer Wise (who was instrumental in creating the institutions of Reform Judaism), and Rabbi David Woolf Marks.

== Legacy ==
Rather than resolving the issues of religion and Jewish nationalism it addressed, the adoption of the Pittsburgh Platform only intensified the debate within American Judaism about how Halacha, Jewish peoplehood, and Zionism should be viewed. By openly disavowing those concepts, the leading Reformers alienated more moderate reformers like Sabato Morais, who advocated a compromise approach to Halacha in the belief that it would better maintain Jewish continuity. Morais and his supporters (including Rabbis Alexander Kohut and Bernard Drachman) joined moderates within the traditional community, such as Rabbi Solomon Schechter, in establishing the Jewish Theological Seminary, which would grow into the Conservative Jewish movement in the late 1880s. Today, Conservative Judaism is the second largest Jewish denomination in America.

The non-Zionist ideas of the Pittsburgh Platform remained (and remain) controversial within the Reform movement, particularly for those who supported the movement. Every successive major platform of the UAHC (now the Union for Reform Judaism) backed off further from the ideas contained in the Pittsburgh platform. The Union's 1937 Columbus Platform included a more nuanced endorsement of Zionism, noting "In all lands where our people live, they assume and seek to share loyally the full duties and responsibilities of citizenship and to create seats of Jewish knowledge and religion. In the rehabilitation of Palestine, the land hallowed by memories and hopes, we behold the promise of renewed life for many of our brethren. We affirm the obligation of all Jewry to aid in its upbuilding as a Jewish homeland by endeavoring to make it not only a haven of refuge for the oppressed but also a center of Jewish culture and spiritual life." This major restatement of the "Guiding Principles of Reform Judaism" was an acceptance of the massive demographic shift caused by recent waves of eastern European Jewish immigrants attracted to Zionism, as well as influential pro-Zionist Reform rabbis like Stephen S. Wise, Abba Hillel Silver, and Max Raisin, the formation of the competing and "ardently Zionist" American Jewish Congress, and the recent sharp increase in European antisemitism brought on by the rise of Fascism. Prominent Reform rabbis who were more integrationist, unwilling to abandon the principle that Jews should live as free and equal citizens in the United States and other countries around the world, and who rejected the idea in 1942 of a religiously segregated Jewish army to fight alongside the Allies, formed the American Council for Judaism.

In 1976, nearly thirty years after the establishment of Israel, the recognition of Jewish "peoplehood" was noted by the Central Conference of American Rabbis (CCAR) in their "Centenary Perspective", adopted in San Francisco, and marking the centenaries of the founding of the Union of American Hebrew Congregations and the Hebrew Union College-Jewish Institute of Religion. Marking the 100th anniversary of political Zionism in 1997, the CCAR dealt specifically for the first time with issues related to Zionism in its “Reform Judaism & Zionism: A Centenary Platform”, also known as the "Miami Platform". The perspective noted the trends that had occurred within Reform Jewish thought with respect to the religion, its people and religious practice, their movement from degradation to sovereignty, their relationship and obligations to Israel, as well as Israel's obligations to Jews of the Diaspora, and redemption. The Union's new 1999 "Statement of Principles for Reform Judaism", also called the New Pittsburgh Platform, again noted the trends that had occurred within Reform Jewish and codified these with respect to religious practice and the modern state of Israel. The 1999 platform called for "renewed attention" to "sacred obligations," of which it mentioned the observance of holidays and Shabbat, prayer, and the study of Torah and the Hebrew language. The statement endorsed aliyah (emigration to Israel) for the first time, and notes differences within both the country Israel and Reform Judaism concerning the relationship of Medinat Yisrael (the modern state of Israel) and Eretz Yisrael (the Biblical Israel), included in on-going debates regarding conceptions of Zionism. Reform Judaism still holds that Halacha is not binding, and has since embraced other concepts like patrilineal descent that keep it in tension with the more traditional movements of Judaism which remain in control of religious law in Israel.

The principles of the Platform are often evoked by organisations espousing a "classical" approach to Reform Judaism, like the American Council for Judaism and Society for Classical Reform Judaism.

== See also ==
- Columbus Platform
- Miami Platform
- New Pittsburgh Platform
- Reform Judaism: A Centenary Perspective

== Bibliography ==
- Meyer, Michael A. (1995). Response to Modernity: A History of the Reform Movement in Judaism. Detroit: Wayne State University Press. ISBN 0-8143-2555-6.
- Pitz, Marylynne (2007). Pittsburgh Post-Gazette: Reform Judaism made its mark here: Historical marker unveiled on North Side to celebrate 1885 Pittsburgh Platform. Retrieved October 11, 2007.
- Vital, David (1999). A People Apart: The Jews in Europe 1789–1939. Oxford University Press. ISBN 0-19-821980-6.
