= Joseph Silverman =

American rabbi (1860–1930)

Joseph Silverman (August 25, 1860 in Ohio – July 26, 1930 in New York City), was a leading American Reform rabbi and author. He was the first American born rabbi to serve in New York City.

Born in Cincinnati, he attended the University of Cincinnati and received a Doctor of Divinity from the Hebrew Union College in 1887, from which he received his rabbinic ordination three years earlier. In 1887, he married and subsequently had five children with his wife Henrietta.

He was Rabbi of Temple Emanu-El, Dallas, Texas, September 1884 to June 1885; rabbi of Congregation B'nai Israel, Galveston, Texas July, 1885 to February 20, 1888. While in Texas he was a circuit preacher to the Jewish communities in the vicinity of Dallas and Galveston, and aided in organizing many Sabbath schools and congregations. He was consulting editor of the Jewish Encyclopedia (Funk & Wagnalls). He helped organize the Religious Congress of the World's Fair in Chicago, 1893, where his address on this occasion was titled, "The Popular Errors About the Jews."

At the beginning of 1888, Silverman received an offer from Temple Emanu-El in New York City to serve as a rabbi of the leading Reform congregation in America. Silverman started at Temple Emanu-El on March 1, 1888, succeeding rabbi Gustav Gottheil.

During the years of his career in New York, 1888-1922 he was also president (1900–1903) of the Central Conference of American Rabbis, the Eastern Council 1918- and was founder and president of the Emanu-El Brotherhood.

Silverman published many articles and books, including A Catechism on Judaism (1886) and The Renaissance of Judaism (1918). An article from The New York Times on April 21, 1912, quoted Silverman at a memorial service for victims of the RMS Titanic disaster as saying "Not God was responsible for this great disaster but the imperfection of human knowledge and judgment."

Silverman died on July 26, 1930, having spent 34 years as the leader of Temple Emanu-El followed by eight years as Rabbi Emeritus. The New York Times described him in its obituary as "one of the most prominent clergymen of his faith in America".
