= Central Conference of American Rabbis =

American religious organisation

The Central Conference of American Rabbis (CCAR), founded in 1889 by Rabbi Isaac Mayer Wise, is the principal organization of Reform rabbis in the United States and Canada. The CCAR is the largest and oldest rabbinical organization in the world. Its current president is Rabbi David Lyon.

Rabbi Hara Person is the Chief Executive.

== Overview ==
The CCAR bylaws state that "the purpose of this Conference shall be to preserve and promote Judaism and to encourage all efforts for the dissemination of its teachings in a Liberal spirit; to advance the cause of Jewish learning; to foster fellowship and cooperation among rabbis and other Jewish scholars; and to serve the welfare of its members."

Membership primarily consists of rabbis educated at Hebrew Union College – Jewish Institute of Religion. The CCAR also offers membership to those who have graduated in Europe from the Leo Baeck College in London (United Kingdom) and the Abraham Geiger College at the University of Potsdam, and other rabbis who joined the Reform movement after being ordained and met the membership criteria.

The CCAR issues responses to religious questions for Reform Judaism known as responsa, as well as resolutions, and platforms. In keeping with the principles of Reform Judaism, their positions are non-binding on individual rabbis or congregations. It is also the publisher of CCAR Journal, a journal of Reform Judaism published quarterly. The group also runs the CCAR Press, a publishing house for Reform Judaism that publishes the movement's prayer books as well as a variety of publications about contemporary Jewish life.

== Platforms ==
From time to time the CCAR publishes platforms that are intended to layout the contemporary framework for North American Reform Judaism.

The publication of platforms began in 1885 with the Declaration of Principles, later known as the Pittsburgh Platform, which established Reform Judaism in North America, and built upon the founding ideas of Reform Judaism in Germany. While written before the CCAR was formally founded, the meeting was declared the continuation of the Philadelphia Conference of 1869, which was the continuation of the German Conference of 1841 to 1846.

In 1937 the Columbus Platform was approved as the first official platform of the American Reform movement.

The CCAR continues to rewrite platforms as Reform Judaism evolves:

- 1976 Centenary Perspective
- 1997 Reform Judaism & Zionism: A Centenary Platform known as "The Miami Platform"
- 1999 A Statement of Principles for Reform Judaism

== Reform Rabbinic Voice ==
As the largest organization of liberal rabbis in the world, the CCAR frequently comments on pressing issues of the day through public statements and resolutions.

Some examples include:

- In 1964, the CCAR began to take an official position opposing the American war in Vietnam, and in 1972 it began to refuse to pay the federal excise tax on telephone service as a protest against that war.
- In 1983, the CCAR took one of its most controversial stands and formally affirmed that a Jewish identity can be passed down through either the mother or the father, if the child is raised with a Jewish identity.
- In 2014, the CCAR joined a lawsuit challenging North Carolina's ban on same-sex marriage, which was America's first faith-based challenge to same-sex marriage bans.
- In 2023, the CCAR passed a resolution advocating for the rights of transgender people in response to a national right wing movement to remove rights and a significant uptick in violence against transgender people, stating in part, "These attacks threaten the most vulnerable among us and challenge our Reform Jewish values. Their consequences are alarming—including the appalling murder rates of transgender people and the high rates of suicidal ideation and suicide among trans youth. By contrast, we know that an affirmative, proactive encouragement of gender diversity can make a positive difference."
- In 2024, the CCAR issued a joint statement with other Reform Movement institutions about the war between Israel and Hamas, stating, "In this darkest of times, we remain committed to a resolution of the conflict that will ensure Israel's security and allow for Palestinian self-determination and self-governance ... Further, the widespread distrust of the Palestinians and their leadership in both Gaza and the West Bank, as well as deep Palestinian mistrust of Israel's leadership, will require significant efforts by the Israelis, Palestinians, regional neighbors, and the international community to make such a resolution a viable reality. A successful and peaceful Palestinian entity remains vital to ensuring Israel's long-term security. For these reasons, we are deeply dismayed by Prime Minister Netanyahu's recent comments dismissing the possibility of a future peaceful Palestinian state."
- In 2024, the CCAR passed a resolution against book bans stating that "Book bans often represent attempts to erase vulnerable individuals and communities—and to silence marginalized voices—which has happened to Jews repeatedly throughout history."

== Leadership ==
The CCAR is led by a volunteer president who is elected from among members as well as a paid professional executive.

=== Notable leadership ===
In 2003, Rabbi Janet Marder became the first female president of the CCAR; this made her the first woman to lead a major rabbinical organization and the first woman to lead any major Jewish co-ed religious organization in the United States.

In 2015, Denise Eger became the first openly gay president of the CCAR.

In 2018, Rabbi Hara Person became the first woman to be the chief executive of the CCAR.

== Rabbinic Ethics ==
The Central Conference of American Rabbis (CCAR) has an ethics code which all members are required to uphold, and an ethics committee to handle complaints and discipline any member rabbi found to be in violation of the code. This system only holds jurisdiction over rabbis who are part of the CCAR as it is a voluntary membership organization. While the vast majority of CCAR rabbis have not faced accusations of ethics violations, instances of serious misconduct such as financial impropriety, plagiarism, theft, and sexual misconduct, including sexual assault, have occurred in the past. Historically, these matters were dealt with privately, often resulting in minimal repercussions for the offending rabbis.

At the annual convention in June 1991, recognizing the need for a more formalized approach, the CCAR adopted an Ethics Code and Ethics Committee with the aim of safeguarding congregants and communities from problematic behavior by rabbis. This committee was granted the authority to discipline rabbis, including the possibility of permanent suspension or expulsion. However, despite this step forward, investigations remained slow, and many offending rabbis faced little to no public consequences for their actions, often receiving private reprimands.

A 1996 report by the Jewish Telegraphic Agency (JTA) shed light on the sluggish investigative process and the lack of meaningful consequences for offending rabbis. This led to public criticism and increased scrutiny of the CCAR's handling of ethical issues within its ranks. Subsequent cases, such as the expulsion of a CCAR member rabbi in 2015 for sexual misconduct, further underscored these concerns. For example, in 2014, a senior rabbi of a Texas synagogue was reprimanded for sexual misconduct and allowed to move to another senior rabbi position in North Carolina, where he was censured for sexual misconduct within 36 months of his new placement, and neither congregation was alerted to the allegations.

In 2015, Rabbi Denise Eger was elected president of the CCAR. The first openly LGBTQ person to hold this prominent role, Rabbi Eger made ethics a central focus of her presidency. In 2018, Rabbi Hara Person became the first woman to be the chief executive of the CCAR and also pushed for higher ethical standards and accountability.

In 2021, the organization voluntarily commissioned a legal firm to review its ethics processes and propose improvements. This initiative resulted in several recommendations, including increased transparency regarding ethical infractions and a formal apology issued by the CCAR in September 2022, that included the following language:

With sincerity of heart and intention, the CCAR apologizes for the hurt that our organization and our ethics system have caused. We acknowledge that there have been times when we failed to meet our own high standards and we are deeply sorry. We apologize, and we are committed to working diligently for a better future.

While these efforts have been praised by many, some critics argue that they do not go far enough to address underlying issues within the ethics system. For instance, concerns have been raised about the continued use of lay investigators and the reliance on fellow rabbis to determine the fitness of an offender to return to their role. However, similar practices are commonplace in other professional organizations in the United States such as the National Association of Social Workers, the American Psychological Association, and the American Bar Association.

Despite ongoing challenges, the CCAR remains committed to enhancing its ethics process and now provides annual progress reports about the ethics system.

== List of presidents ==
- Isaac M. Wise: 1889–1900
- Joseph Silverman: 1900–1903
- Joseph Krauskopf: 1903–1905
- Joseph Stolz: 1905–1907
- David Philipson: 1907–1909
- Maximilian Heller: 1909–1911
- Samuel Schulman: 1911–1913
- Moses J. Gries: 1913–1915
- William Rosenau: 1915–1917
- Louis Grossmann: 1917–1919
- Leo M. Franklin: 1919–1921
- Edward N. Calish: 1921–1923
- Abram Simon: 1923–1925
- Louis Wolsey: 1925–1927
- Hyman G. Enelow: 1927–1929
- David Lefkowitz: 1929–1931
- Morris Newfield: 1931–1933
- Samuel H. Goldenson: 1933–1935
- Felix A. Levy: 1935–1937
- Max C. Currick: 1937–1939
- Emil W. Leipziger: 1939–1941
- James G. Heller: 1941–1943
- Solomon B. Freehof: 1943–1945
- Abba Hillel Silver: 1945–1947
- Abraham J. Feldman: 1947–1949
- Jacob R. Marcus: 1949–1951
- Philip S. Bernstein: 1951–1953
- Joseph L. Fink: 1953–1955
- Barnett R. Brickner: 1955–1957
- Israel Bettan:1957
- Jacob Philip Rudin: 1957–1959
- Bernard J. Bamberger: 1959–1961
- Albert G. Minda: 1961–1963
- Leon I. Feuer: 1963–1965
- Jacob J. Weinstein: 1965–1967
- Levi A. Olan: 1967–1969
- Roland B. Gittelsohn: 1969–1971
- David Polish: 1971–1973
- Robert I. Kahn: 1973–1975
- Arthur J. Lelyveld: 1975–1977
- Ely E. Pilchik: 1977–1979
- Jerome R. Malino: 1979–1981
- Herman E. Schaalman: 1981–1983
- W. Gunther Plaut: 1983–1985
- Jack Stern: 1985–1987
- Eugene J. Lipman: 1987–1989
- Samuel E. Karff: 1989–1991
- Walter Jacob: 1991–1993
- Sheldon Zimmerman: 1993–1995
- Simeon J. Maslin: 1995–1997
- Richard N. Levy: 1997–1999
- Charles A. Kroloff: 1999–2001
- Martin S. Weiner: 2001–2003
- Janet Marder: 2003–2005
- Harry Danziger: 2005–2007
- Peter Knobel: 2007–2009
- Ellen Weinberg Dreyfus: 2009–2011
- Jonathan Stein: 2011–2013
- Richard A. Block: 2013–2015
- Denise L. Eger: 2015–2017
- David Stern: 2017–2019
- Ronald Segal: 2019–2021
- Lewis Kamrass: 2021- 2023
- Erica Seager Asch: 2023-2025
- David Lyon: 2025-Present
