= Charles E. Bloch =

Jewish-American publisher

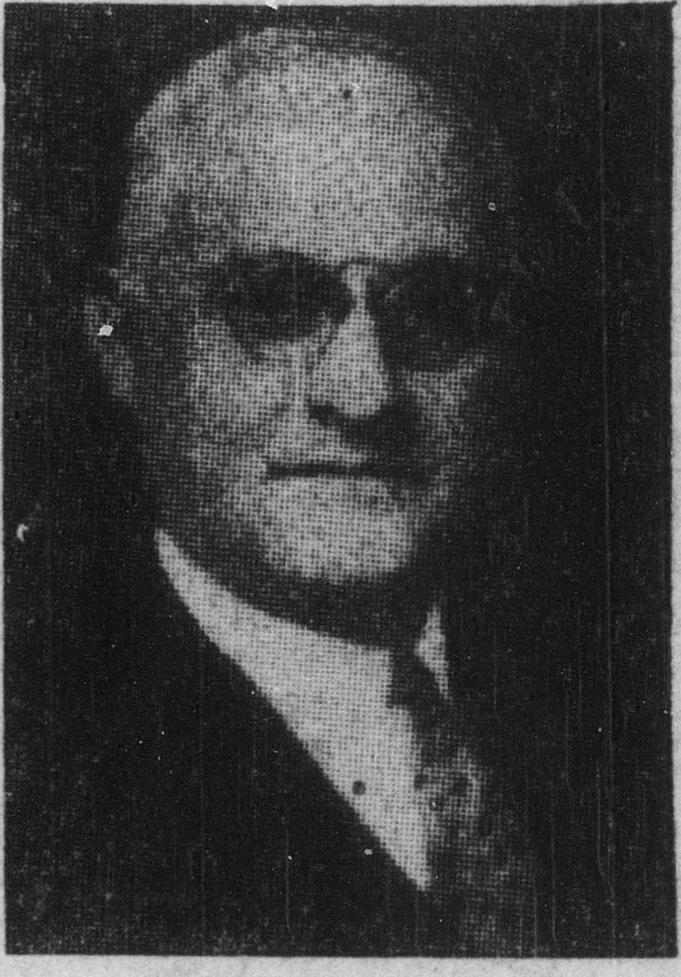
Charles E. Bloch

Charles Edward Bloch (December 22, 1861 – September 2, 1940) was a Jewish-American publisher from New York.

== Life ==
Bloch was born on December 22, 1861, in Cincinnati, Ohio, the son of Edward Bloch and Henrietta Miller. His father founded the printing and publishing firm Bloch Publishing Company in 1854 and edited and published The American Israelite and Deborah with his brother-in-law Isaac Mayer Wise.

Bloch began working as printer's devil in his father's company in 1878. He was then appointed superintendent while still in his early twenties. In 1885, he went to Chicago, Illinois, to manage The Chicago Israelite, an edition of The American Israelite. In 1891, he and Emanuel W. Newman founded The Reform Advocate, with Emil G. Hirsch as its first editor. In 1901, at his father's suggestion, he moved to New York City, New York, to establish the family firm there. In 1907, he helped found the Free Synagogue with Stephen S. Wise, serving as its first secretary and later as its president and trustee. He also helped establish the Jewish Institute of Religion. He served as president of the Bloch Publishing Company until his death, after which his son Edward succeeded him.

Bloch was a director of the American Flag Company and a member of the American Publishers Association, the American Book Sellers League, and the National Book Sellers Association. He married Bertha Eisendrath in 1888. Their children were Benjamin C., Ruth, and Edward H.

Bloch died from a heart attack at his home in Great Neck on September 2, 1940.
