= Don Mellett =

American newspaper editor (1891–1926)

Donald R. Mellett
- Born: Donald Ring Mellett; September 26, 1891; Elwood, Indiana, U.S.
- Died: July 16, 1926 (aged 34); Canton, Ohio, U.S.
- Cause of death: Murder
- Resting place: Crown Hill Cemetery, Indianapolis
- Education: Indiana University '14
- Occupation: Newspaper editor
- Employer: Canton Daily News (January 1925-July 1926)
- Known for: Stance against corruption
- Spouse: Florence Evans

Donald Ring Mellett (September 26, 1891 – July 16, 1926) was an American newspaper editor who was assassinated after confronting local organized crime in his newspaper.

Mellett was born in Elwood, Indiana, as the child of a newspaper editor. He followed with the family tradition by becoming a journalist, as did several of his siblings. He studied at Indiana University, where he became the editor of the school's newspaper, The Daily Student (now the Indiana Daily Student).

== Early career ==
After leaving college due to illness, Mellett took on work with the Indianapolis News and the National Enquirer. Some time later, he purchased the Columbus Ledger, and began working as its editor, before moving on to a position at The Akron Press. Then, in January 1925 he accepted an offer to edit the Canton Daily News in Canton, Ohio.

At the time, the Daily News was struggling, and had only half the circulation of its rival paper, The Repository. He began using the paper to fight local corruption, and was soon successful in pressuring the mayor to suspend the police chief. His efforts also led to the conviction of two underworld figures. Under Mellett, the paper successfully supported a Democratic candidate for mayor, in a town that had traditionally supported Republicans.

== Death ==
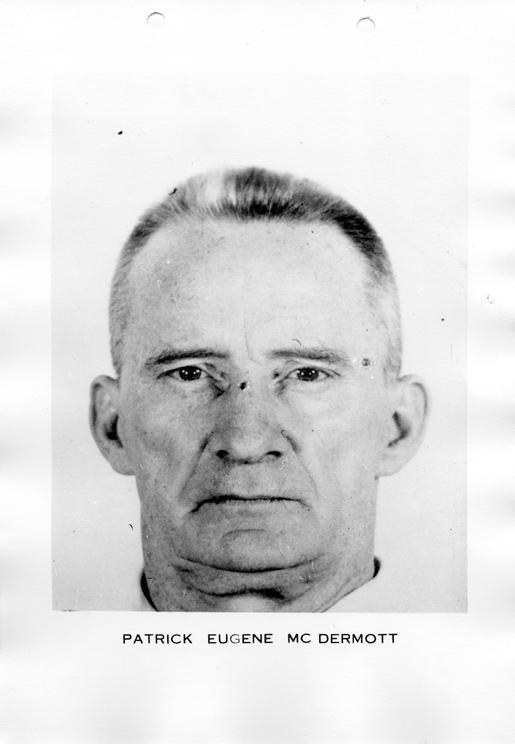
Patrick Eugene McDermott FBI Most Wanted Poster

By May 1926, the newspaper had almost caught up to its rival in terms of circulation, and was closing the gap rapidly. In the weeks leading up to his assassination, Mellett began investigating the murder of a local underworld figure and whistleblower, Paul Kitzig. He accused another underworld figure, Ben Rudner, of the crime, and printed what evidence he could obtain. He began to receive death threats, and hired a bodyguard, but decided to let him go, shortly before he was shot to death in his garage on July 16, 1926, at the age of 34.

L. E. Judd, The Akron-Press editor, played a major role in the investigation of the murder.

An early investigation by the local police (of which the integrity was later questioned) turned up nothing, but some time later, Ora Slater, a detective from elsewhere, was successful in resolving the murder. As a result, four people, including not only Rudner, but the Canton police chief at the time, were sentenced to life imprisonment. The police chief was later acquitted.

The triggerman, Patrick Eugene McDermott, would receive a life sentence. He would later escape from prison and be #85 on the FBI's Ten Most Wanted List.

== Pulitzer Prize ==
The year after Mellett's death, the Canton Daily News was rewarded with the Pulitzer Prize for Public Service for their efforts in fighting corruption. The citation acknowledged Mellett's own personal sacrifice. However, after Mellett's death, the newspaper returned to decline, and only months after winning the Pulitzer Prize, was bought out by The Repository.

The plot of the film Freedom of the Press (1928) was based on Mellett's death. A teleplay about Mellett, titled "The Canton Story", was made in 1950. It appeared on October 13, 1950, in Pulitzer Prize Playhouse. The Don Mellett Memorial Lecture in Journalism is named in his honor, as is New York University's Don R. Mellett Prize. Mellett was inducted into the Indiana Journalism Hall of Fame in 1969. In 1976, the Mellett Historic Site in Journalism was created in Canton. Numerous books have also been written about his life, and an auditorium at Indiana University, his alma mater, was named after him. In addition, Mellett Mall (now Canton Centre) in Canton was formerly named for him.
