= Gotthard Deutsch =

American rabbi and historian (1859–1921)

Rabbi Dr. Gotthard Deutsch
- אליעזר דויטש
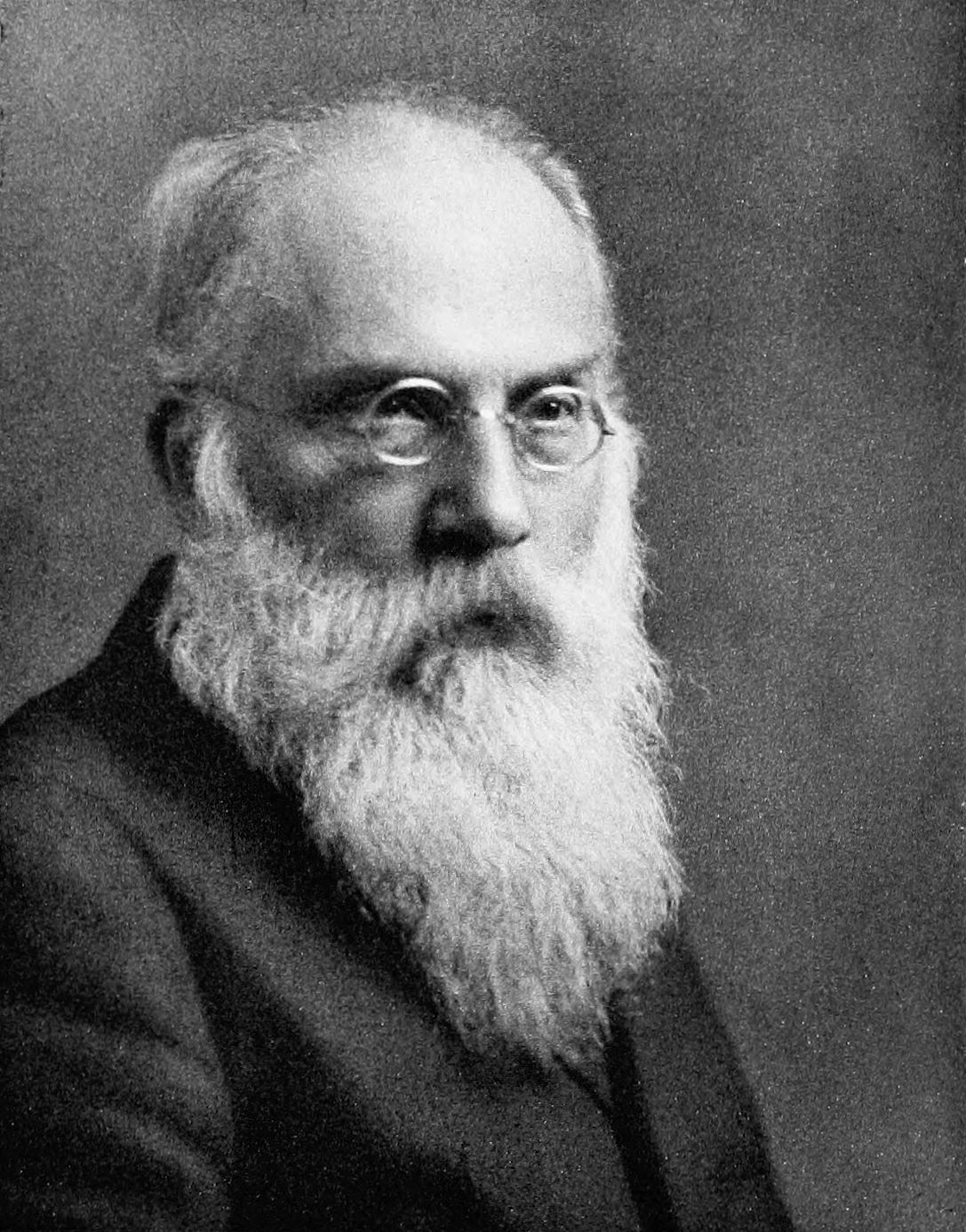
- Born: Eliezer Deutsch; 31 January 1859; Dolní Kounice, Moravia, Austria
- Died: 14 October 1921 (aged 62); Cincinnati, Ohio, United States
- Children: Naomi Deutsch

Academic background
- Education: University of Vienna

Academic work
- Discipline: Jewish history
- Institutions: Hebrew Union College

Gotthard Deutsch (Hebrew: אליעזר דויטש; 31 January 1859 – 14 October 1921) was a scholar of Jewish history.

== Education ==
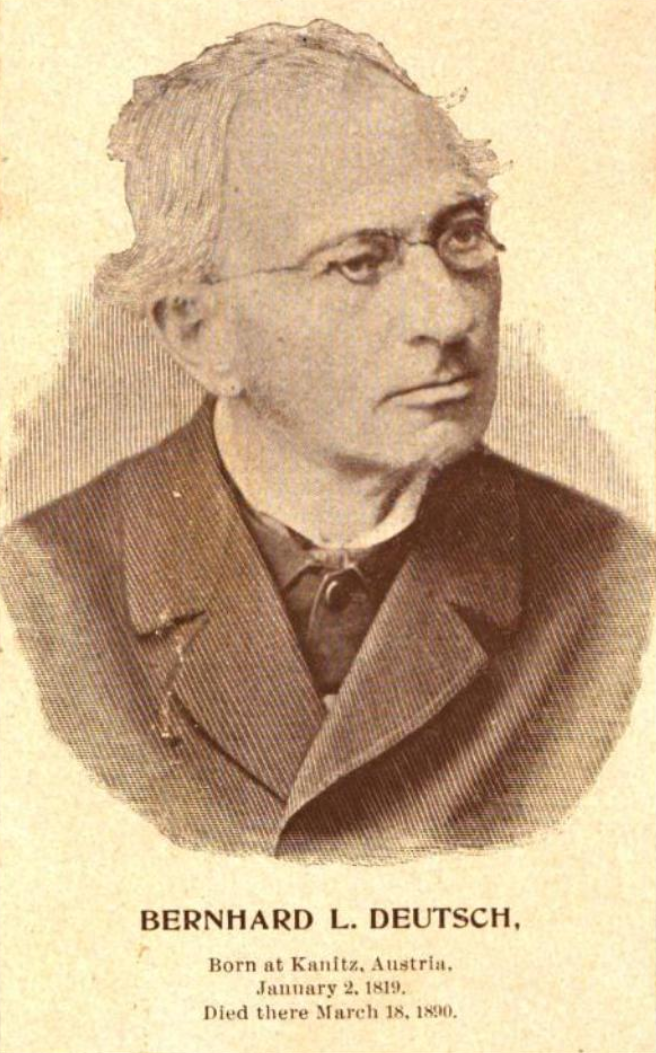
Bernhard L. Deutsch, Gotthard's father

Deutsch was born in Dolní Kounice, Moravia, Austria, as Eliezer Deutsch, the son of Issachar Baer (Bernhard L.) Deutsch (1819-1890), (Note: "To my father and teacher . . . our teacher Rabbi Issachar "Baer", son of Rabbi Eliezer, son of Rabbi Jekutiel Ze'ev "Zalman Wolf", son of the judge Rabbi Menahem Mendel, son of Rabbi Joseph, son of the learned Rabbi [Jacob] Eliezer [Braunschweig], author of Siah avdei avot, who studied under Samson Wertheimer in Vienna and was buried there on 16 April 1729".) a merchant, and Elise Wiener. He always called himself Gotthard, an attempted translation into German of his Jewish given name. Deutsch entered Jewish Theological Seminary of Breslau in October 1876. While attending seminary classes, he also enrolled in afternoon classes at the University of Breslau. At the seminary, he was influenced by the noted Jewish historian Heinrich Graetz. Matriculating in 1879 at the University of Vienna, two years later he received his Ph.D. in history. While attending the university, he enrolled in a Talmudic course taught by Isaac Hirsch Weiss at Beth Hammidrash. During his studies in Vienna, Deutsch drew inspiration and guidance from both Weiss and Adolf Jellinek, an authority in Midrashic research. Shortly after his graduation, Deutsch received Semichah (ordination) from Weiss.

== Rabbinical and academic career ==
In 1881 Deutsch accepted a probational position as sabbath schoolteacher for a Jewish congregation in Brno, Moravia. The following year he was appointed to teach religion at the city's German high school. After teaching for six years (1881–1887) at Brno, he entered the rabbinate. His first and only charge came in 1887, in the town of Most, Bohemia. Deutsch was far from content at his new vocation. Soon, he yearned for an academic milieu and the opportunity of satisfying his craving for knowledge. At Most, he married in May 1888 Hermine Bacher; the couple had three sons and two daughters.

In 1891, at the invitation of Isaac Mayer Wise, Deutsch moved to the United States to accept the chair of Jewish history and philosophy at Hebrew Union College in Cincinnati. After eleven years of teaching there, he was appointed dean. In February 1903, after the death of Moses Mielziner, he was designated acting president of the college, a position he held until October of the same year.

In 1912, Deutsch delivered lectures on Jewish history at the University of Chicago. While speaking at schools throughout the United States, Deutsch was also a guiding force at the local level. This included his association with the Cincinnati German Club and in 1909 his election to the Cincinnati Board of Education, a position he held for four years. Much of Deutsch's time was also spent as an editor and chief contributor to the Jewish Encyclopedia, as corresponding secretary for the Central Conference of American Rabbis, and as chairman of the conference's Committee on Contemporaneous History.

== World War I ==
One of the turning points in Deutsch's life came with the United States's entry into World War I. His lifelong love for Germany had led Deutsch to support Woodrow Wilson's neutrality while aligning himself with the People's Council of America for Democracy and Peace. In the tide of anti-German hysteria, Deutsch found himself alone and ostracized. He spoke out singularly, sometimes bitterly, against his adopted country's wartime role. On 5 October 1917, federal agents and local detectives raided the council's headquarters.

Shortly thereafter, at a friend's naturalization hearing, Deutsch refused to answer the question "Who do you want to win in this war?" Those activities and subsequent newspaper headlines led many colleagues and the public to demand his immediate removal from the college's faculty. Only the staunch support of his students, friends, and leading Reform rabbis enabled Deutsch to continue teaching.

== Death ==
Deutsch died at his home in Cincinnati at age 62. He was mourned by Jew and non-Jew, progressive and conservative; thousands filled the Cincinnati Crematory to pay their last respects.

== Work and legacy ==
Although a biblical scholar, Deutsch is also known for his two novels and works on history and language. One of the world's greatest Jewish scholars, Deutsch possessed a knack for memorizing facts, biblical scriptures, secular literature, and world history. He also wrote in several languages, including Hebrew, Yiddish, German, French, and English.

A prolific writer, Deutsch produced hundreds of newspaper and journal articles with commentary; these appeared mainly in the Jewish Chronicle, American Hebrew, Central Conference of American Rabbis Yearbook, Hebrew Union College Journal, American Israelite, and American Journal of Theology. Besides contributing to Die Deborah, he succeeded Isaac Wise in 1901 as its editor. His list of scholarly works is equally impressive:

- Paradigmen-Tafeln zur hebräischen Grammatik (1886)
- Die Symbolik in Cultus und Dichtung bei den Hebräern (1886)
- Philosophy of Jewish History (1897)
- Andere Zeiten, eine Erzählung aus dem jüdischen Leben der jüngsten Vergangenheit (1898)
- Unlösbare Fesseln, eine Erzählung aus dem jüdischen Leben der Gegenwart (1903)
- Memorable Dates of Jewish History (1904)
- Four Epochs of Jewish History (1905)
- Israel Bruna, an Historical Tragedy in Five Acts (1908)
- The History of the Jews (1910)
- Der Glaube an Hobelspäne (1914)
- Scrolls (2 vols., 1917; 3rd vol., 1919), and other pamphlets and reprints. His works are considered by many to be the authoritative word on questions relating to the Jewish faith.

== Sources ==
- The Bernhard Felsenthal Papers, in the Hebrew Jewish Archives, contain an extensive record of correspondences between Deutsch and Bernhard Felsenthal.
- Adolph S. Oko, Selected List of the Writings of Gotthard Deutsch (1916), presents an extensive bibliography of Deutsch's major publications.
- Biographical sketches of Deutsch are in Max Raisin, Great Jews I Have Known (1952), pp. 143–52, and an excellent unpublished sketch by Raisin in the Hebrew Jewish Archives.
- Celebrating Deutsch's semi-jubilee, the Hebrew Union College Monthly (2, no. 8 [May 1916]) published a series of tributes and editorials by E. L. Heinsheimer, Henry Englander, Abraham Jehiel Feldman, S. Felix Mendelsohn, H. B. Cantor, and Jacob I. Meyer, among others. These papers treat Deutsch's religious concerns, contribution to literature, and his role in Jewish history.
- A useful history of Hebrew Union College is Samuel E. Karff, ed., Hebrew Union College-Jewish Institute of Religion at One Hundred Years (1976).
- A comprehensive memorial by Henry Englander is in "Memorial Addresses and Resolutions: Gotthard Deutsch", Central Conference of American Rabbis 32 (1922): 145–49. Obituaries are in The New York Times, 15 Oct. 1921; American Hebrew, 21 Oct. 1921; B'nai B'rith News, Oct. 1921; Hebrew Union College Monthly 8, no. 5 (Mar. 1922); and Jewish Advocate, 20 Oct. 1921.
- Carl Edwin Lindgren, "Gottard Deutsch" American National Biography Online Feb. 2000 (Oxford University Press)
