= Bloch Publishing Company =

Jewish publisher in the U.S.

- Status: Inactive
- Founded: 1854 or 1855
- Founder: Edward H. Bloch
- Country of origin: United States
- Headquarters location: Jacksonville, Florida
- Publication types: Books
- Nonfiction topics: Judaism
- Official website: www.blochpub.com

Bloch Publishing Company is a Jewish publishing company in the United States. Founded by Edward H. Bloch in 1854, it is the oldest Jewish publishing company and one of the oldest family businesses, in the United States.

== History ==
Edward H. Bloch (born 1829, Grafenried, Bohemia; died 1906, Cincinnati, Ohio) founded the company in Cincinnati in 1854 (another source says 1855). Edward's sister, Theresa Bloch, had married Rabbi Isaac Mayer Wise in 1844, and Edward's early activities were closely associated with those of his famous brother-in-law, who was laying the foundations of the Reform Jewish movement in the United States. When Rabbi Wise moved to Cincinnati, Bloch followed him; Rabbi Wise founded The Israelite newspaper, and after a short time Edward Bloch took over as publisher. Renamed The American Israelite in 1874, and published by Rabbi Wise’s son Leo Wise after 1888, this newspaper is said to be the longest-running Jewish newspaper in the United States. Bloch also published the German-language Die Deborah in Cincinnati, and he initiated Jewish newspapers in St. Louis and Chicago, including the Chicago Reform Advocate, founded in 1891 and edited by the influential Reform Rabbi Emil G. Hirsch.

Bloch began by publishing Rabbi Wise's liturgies, hymnals, and other books for the Reform movement, and expanded to publish books and religious goods on a wide range of Jewish subjects as well as the occasional non-Jewish ones. He was also a successful manufacturer of flags; in fact, his obituary claimed that he was the inventor and first manufacturer of printed flags in the United States, although apparently this claim is not subject to independent verification.

Edward's son, Charles E. Bloch (1861–1940), succeeded his father in control of the company. He opened a branch in Chicago and then moved the company to New York City in 1901 (although Edward Bloch remained in Cincinnati, and held the title of president, until his death in 1906). The company called itself "The Jewish Book Concern" and its New York building became the largest Judaic bookstore in the country. The company was then run in turn by Charles's son, Edward H. Bloch (1898–1982), and then by the second Edward's son, the second Charles E. Bloch (1927–2006). During this time, the small-book market declined and the company's operations contracted but continued. After the second Charles' death in 2006, his son, Mitchell E. Bloch, took over as the fifth generation of the Bloch family to run the company, and the company relocated from its historic offices in New York to Jacksonville, Florida. As of 2021, the company no longer seems to be active.

== Notable Books ==
Bloch Publishing published a wide variety of books of Jewish interest, both scholarly and popular, including such classics as A Book of Jewish Thoughts by Rabbi Joseph Hertz; Peony by Pearl S. Buck; Joseph Klausner's Jesus of Nazareth; and Hugo Bettauer's The City Without Jews.

Bloch Publishing produced a series of long-running Jewish cookbooks that were influential in the development of American Jewish cuisine. “Aunt Babette’s” Cook Book was first published in 1889 and was the first truly successful American Jewish cookbook. Along with traditional Jewish recipes, it also contained an extensive selection of recipes for treif (non-Kosher) ingredients such as pork, oysters, and shellfish, and in this and other ways reflected its roots in the assimilationist tendencies of the 19th-century Reform Jewish movement. After many years of success, in 1918, Bloch replaced "Aunt Babette's" Cook Book with a more Kosher-observant successor, Florence Kreisler Greenbaum's The International Jewish Cook Book, authored by a Hunter College graduate; Bloch billed it (not quite accurately) as "the first strictly kosher cook book ever published in English in this country." In 1941, Mrs. Greenbaum's book was replaced by a more modern, expanded volume, The Jewish Cook Book, written by Mildred Grosberg Bellin, a Smith College graduate who had already written a successful, smaller menu planner/cookbook for Bloch called Modern Jewish Meals. Bellin's encyclopedic, 3,000-recipe cookbook was most recently revised and reissued in 1983 as The Original Jewish Cookbook.
