= Robert E. Segal =

American nonprofit executive (1903-1995)

Robert Ephraim Segal
- Born: December 11, 1903
- Died: November 18, 1995 (aged 91)
- Occupations: Civil rights activist Community leader Columnist
- Years active: 1940–1990s
- Known for: Executive director of the Jewish Community Relations Council of Metropolitan Boston; Activism against discrimination and for human rights

Robert Ephraim Segal (December 11, 1903 – November 18, 1995) was the longtime executive director of the Jewish Community Relations Council of Metropolitan Boston and an activist against discrimination and for human rights.

== Career and activism ==
Segal spent much of his life dealing with fair practices regarding race, religion, education, labor and housing.

Beginning in 1940, Segal was a consultant on human relations and lectured and wrote on the field. He also served as a member of the Board of Governors of the Boston University Human Relations Center and a member of the Executive Board of the Boston Mayor's Committee. As a close correspondent with Archbishop Richard Cushing, Segal played a key role in Jewish-Catholic relations in Boston.

Segal was a long-time columnist for the World News Service/Seven Arts Feature Syndicate. He had a column entitled "As We Were Saying"; he wrote on issues such as bigotry, Israel and the Arabs, ex-Nazis, neo-Nazism and its backers, and the civil rights movement.

Segal was a leader of the Jewish Community Relations Council of Metropolitan Boston and was its executive director from 1943 to 1972, a period that included the Council presidency of David A. Rose. In 1954 Segal explained to the United States Senate Committee on the Judiciary's Subcommittee to Investigate Juvenile Delinquency that the Council was established in part due to juvenile delinquency and anti-Jewish violent acts.

In 1947, Segal endorsed the Temporary Displaced Persons Admission Act, a federal law to assist displaced persons in post-World War II Europe and permit the admission of 400,000 of them to the U.S.

Segal's activism against discrimination has been recorded at least since the 1940s. He was involved with the Massachusetts Commission Against Discrimination and was an activist for fair housing. He was a member of the Newton Fair Housing Federation and a co-ordinator of the 1962 "Housing For All of Our People" Conference In 1966, he was vice chairman of the Massachusetts State Advisory Committee to the United States Commission on Civil Rights. In 1972, advocating for housing for Puerto Ricans, he chaired the same committee and continued in that position for several years.

Segal was executive director of the Aid to the Blind-Jewish Guild, serving the Boston area. In 1990, in his 80s, he helped in uplifting the spirits of seniors.

== Personal life and death ==
His brother was Henry C. Segal (1900-1985), of the American Israelite. His wife, Jane Segal, whom he married in 1932, died in 2004.

Robert E. Segal died on November 18, 1995, in Lexington, Massachusetts.
