= Naomi Deutsch =

American public health nurse

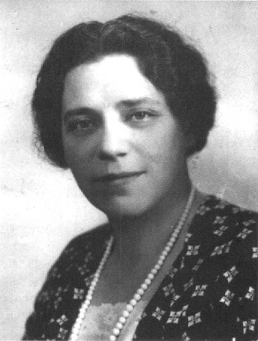
Naomi Deutsch

Naomi Deutsch (November 5, 1890 - November 26, 1983) was a professional Registered nurse, the organizer and director of the Public Health Unit of the Federal Children's Bureau of the Department of Labor of Washington, D.C.

== Early life ==
Naomi Deutsch born in Brno, Moravia, on November 5, 1890, the daughter of Rabbi Dr. Gotthard Deutsch and Hermine Bacher. In 1891 the family moved to Cincinnati, Ohio, where Rabbi Deutsch accepted a position as professor of history at Hebrew Union College-Jewish Institute of Religion. He was also a prolific author. Naomi Deutsch from both paternal and maternal side could trace ancestor back into 15th century Germany.

In 1908 she graduated from Walnut Hills High School (Cincinnati, Ohio). From 1902 to 1909 she travelled in England, France, Switzerland and Italy. In 1912 she graduated from Jewish Hospital (Cincinnati, Ohio). She attended Teachers College, Columbia University from 1916 to 1917 and then again from 1919 to 1921. She obtained a Bachelor of Science degree.

== Career ==
From 1912 to 1916 Naomi Deutsch worked as Public Health Nurse for the Visiting Nurse Association in Cincinnati, Ohio, and then for the Irene Kaufmann Settlement in Pittsburgh, Pennsylvania.

From 1917 to 1924 she was the supervisor, field director and acting director for the Visiting Nurse Service for the Henry Street Settlement in New York City. She was supervisor at the Morrisania, Bronx, office.

During World War I she was rejected from the military service due to the fact her native nation was at war with the United States.

In 1920 she joined the American Red Cross. She was also an early member of the National League of Women Voters.

From 1925 to 1934 she was the director of the San Francisco Visiting Nurse Association.

In 1931 she was invited to the White House Conference on Child Health and Protection and in 1940 she was invited to the Conference on Children in a Democracy.

In 1933 she was a lecturer in Public Health Nursing at the University of California, Berkeley and became appointed assistant in 1934 and later she assumed the full charge of the Public Health Nursing program. She advocated the replacement of full time nurses at home with hourly visiting nurses in conjunction with the care of relatives.

In 1935 she became the organizer and director of the Public Health Unit of the Federal Children's Bureau of the Department of Labor of Washington, D.C. Deutsch worked closely with the United States Public Health Service's Pearl McIver, to support community nursing services in a coordinated way.

She was a member and later on the board of directors of the National Organization of Public Health Nursing. In 1933 she was named president of the California State Organization for Public Health Nursing. She was President of the Social Workers' Alliance of San Francisco. She was a member and later on the board of directors of the California State Nurses Association. She was on the governing council of the American Public Health Association, American Nurses Association, American Association of Social Workers, National Conference of Social Workers and Delta Omega.

In 1943 she became staff member of the Pan American Sanitation Bureau. She was principal nurse consultant and developed health programs in Central America and the Caribbean. From 1945 to 1946 she was associate in research in Nursing Education at the Teachers College Columbia University and became part time instructor from 1946 to 1950.

She was a member of the National League of Nursing Education, Professional and Business Women's Clubs, California State Conference of Social Work.

She was listed in Women of the West (1928), Who's Who in the East (1943), and Who's Who of the World (1948).

She is the author of:

- Generalized public health nursing services in cities (1935)
- Public health nursing under the Social Security Act: Development under the Children's Bureau with H. Hilbert (1936)
- Public health nursing in programs for crippled children (1937)
- Role of public health nurse in service for crippled children (1937)
- What every health officer should know: Public health nursing (1938)
- Economics aspects of maternal care (1939)
- Promoting maternal and child health: Public health nursing under Social Security Act, Title V, Part I with M.D. Willeford (1941)

== Personal life ==
While in California she lived at 1636 Bush Street, San Francisco, California. She retired in 1950 and lived in New York City until 1973. The last 10 years of her life she moved to New Orleans.

She never married but was a close friend to Lillian Wald and her sister Edith.

She died on November 26, 1983.
