= Dolní Kounice Synagogue =

Former synagogue, now museum, in the Czech Republic

- Czech: Synagoga v Dolních Kounicích
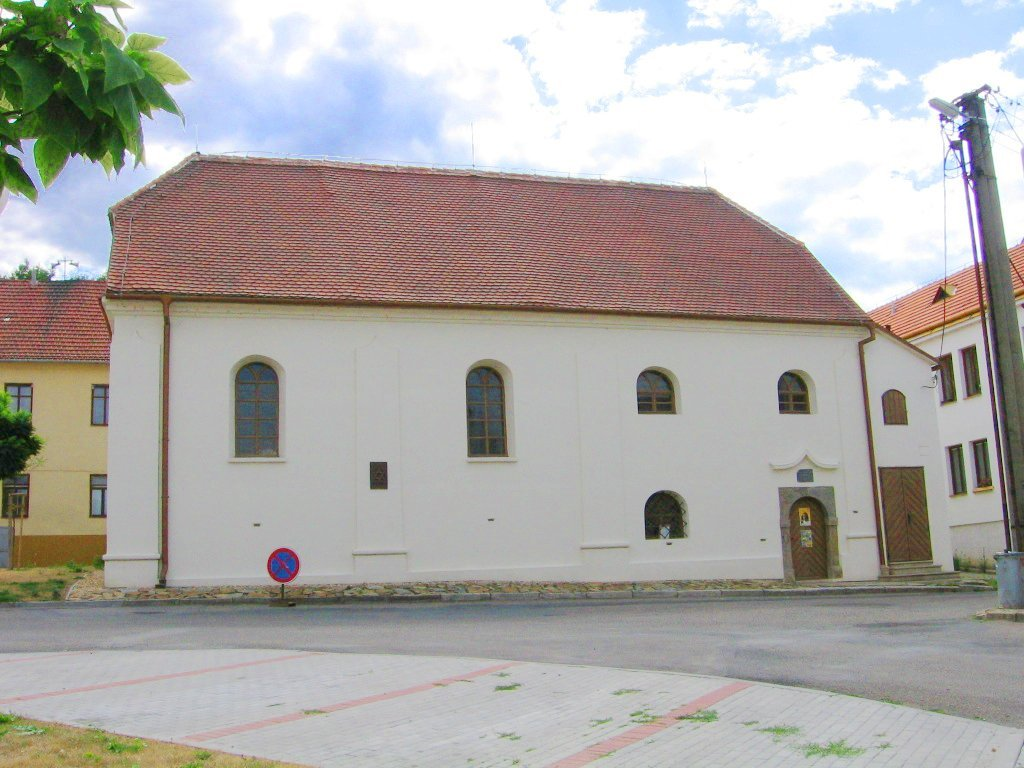
- Northern side of the former synagogue

- Location of the former synagogue, now museum, in the Czech Republic

Religion
- Affiliation: Orthodox Judaism (former)
- Rite: Nusach Ashkenaz
- Ecclesiastical or organisational status: Synagogue (1655–1939); Jewish museum (since 1994)
- Status: Closed (as a synagogue); Repurposed

Location
- Location: U synagogy Street, Dolní Kounice, South Moravian Region
- Country: Czech Republic
- Coordinates: 49°4′12″N 16°27′49″E

Architecture
- Style: Baroque
- Established: 1581 (as a congregation)
- Completed: 1655
- Materials: Stone

The Dolní Kounice Synagogue (Czech: Synagoga v Dolních Kounicích) is a former Orthodox Jewish synagogue, located in Dolní Kounice in the South Moravian Region of the Czech Republic. The building was completed in 1655 and was used as a synagogue by the Ashkenazi congregation until 1939. The building has been used as a Jewish museum since 1994.

== History ==
First traces of Jewish settlement in Dolní Kounice are from half of 15th century. The first written mention of a synagogue here comes from 1581. The old synagogue was located on eastern part of the village and was destroyed by Swedish troops during the Thirty Years' War in 1645.

A new one has been built in the middle of the new ghetto in 1652–1655. It was built in the Baroque style and is one of the oldest synagogues in Moravia. The building has rectangular ground plan and two floors. In the middle of the 19th century, new tract was added and used to extends tribune for women.

In the early 1940s, Nazis closed down the religious services and moved the decorations to the Jewish Museum in Prague. After the war the building was used as storehouse. In 1991 it was returned, as a part of restitutions, to the Jewish community in Brno. In 1994 the former synagogue was reconstructed with the support of the World Monuments Fund and commenced operation as a museum. The synagogue hosts small collection of Jewish historical artefacts and art exhibitions.

== Gallery ==
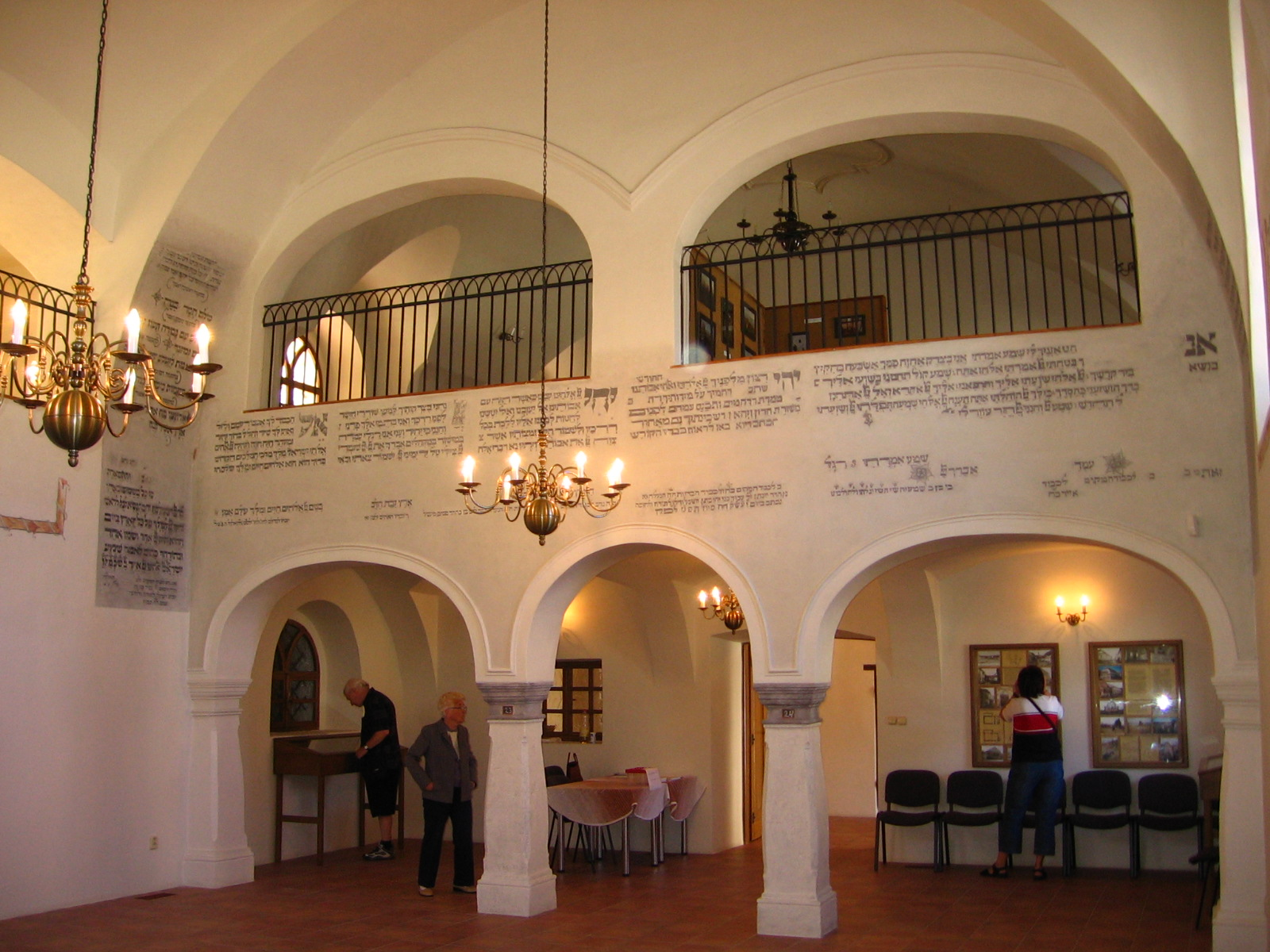

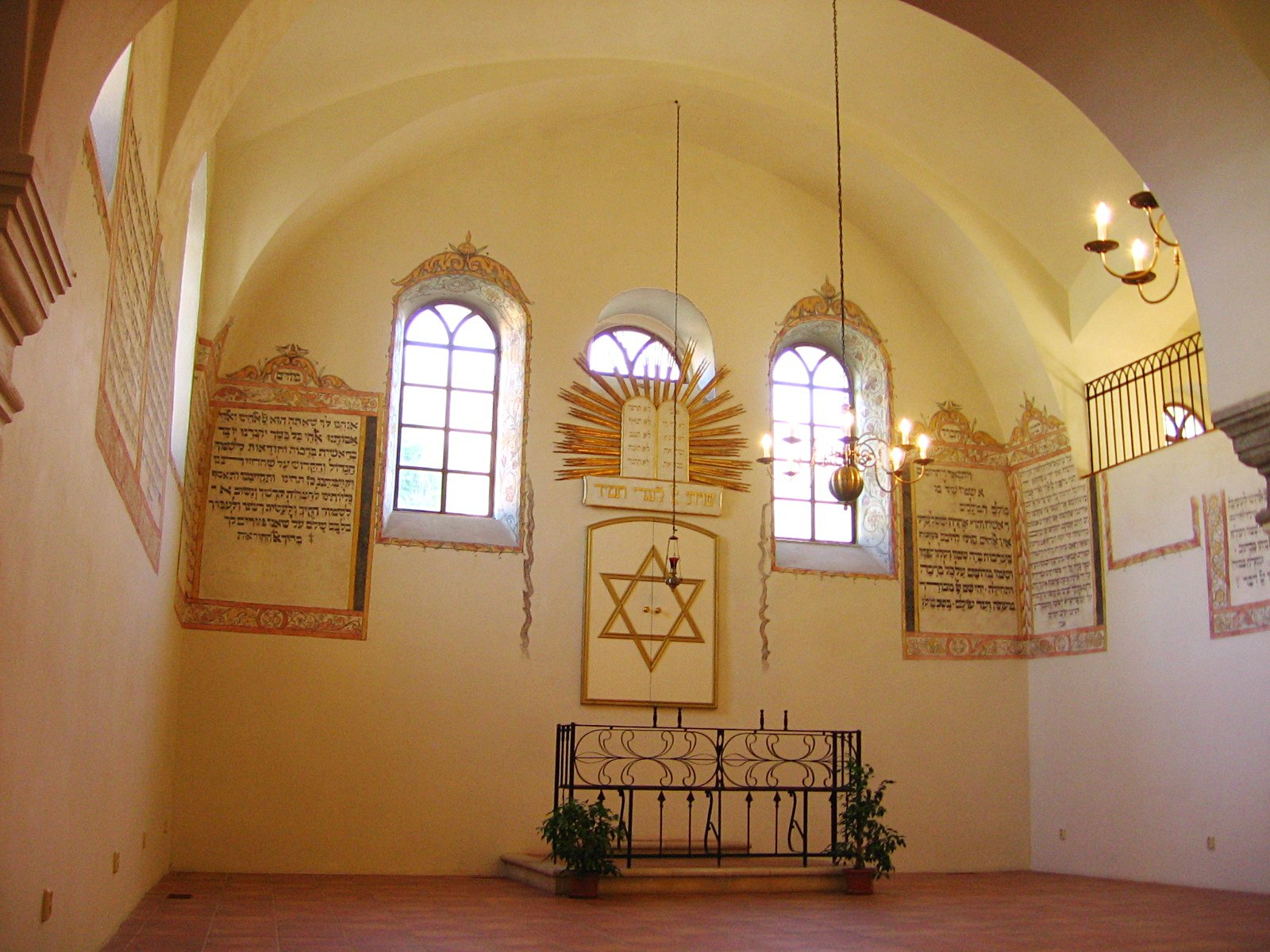

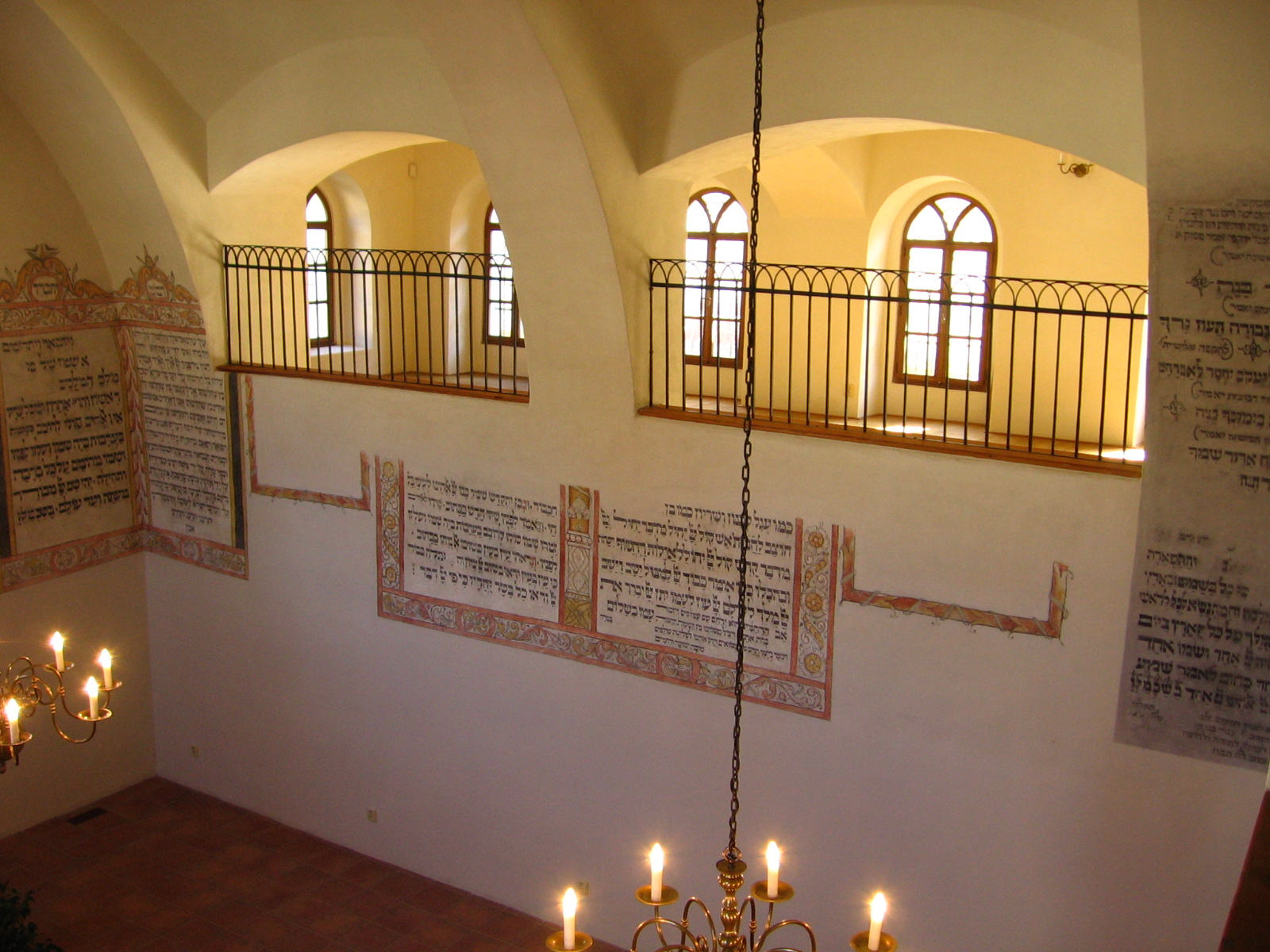

== See also ==
- History of the Jews in the Czech Republic
