= Henry C. Segal =

Former American journalist

Henry Clay Segal (October 27, 1900 – July 18, 1985, Cincinnati) long time journalist, editor of The American Israelite, part time correspondent to The New York Times among other works.

Segal was born October, 1900 in Chillicothe, Ross County, Ohio.

== Career ==
He wrote in, was staff member of The Ohio State Lantern since 1918, was a member of honorary professional journalistic fraternity and graduated from Ohio State in 1922 and again in 1923 with degrees in Liberal Arts and Journalism. He began working soon after.

For a short period, Segal was a reporter for the Akron Press and between 1923 and 1938 worked at The Cincinnati Post.

In 1930, Segal, bought The American Israelite and was its editor since, for over 50 years.

Segal has been teaching journalism at the University of Cincinnati.

Segal worked as well at The Cincinnati Post, and as correspondent for The New York Times, part-time, for over three decades.

Throughout his career, Segal was active as well, in community activities.

== Personal life ==
His brother was, Robert E. Segal, Boston community leader and activist.

His wife, Henriette, involved in philanthropic organization, died in 1954. Henry C Segal died in July 1985, in Cincinnati.

== See also ==
- The American Israelite, Subsequent history
