= Leo Wise =

Jewish-American newspaper editor and publisher (1849–1933)

Leo Wise (October 28, 1849 – January 27, 1933) was a Jewish-American newspaper editor and publisher.

== Life ==
Wise was born on October 28, 1849, in Albany, New York, the son of Rabbi Isaac Mayer Wise and Theresa Bloch. He moved to Cincinnati, Ohio, with his family in 1854, where his father became rabbi of what later became known as the Isaac M. Wise Temple.

In 1863, during the American Civil War, Wise briefly served in the River Flotilla of the United States Navy. He attended St. Xavier College and Farmers College in Cincinnati, Trinity College in Hartford, Connecticut, and the University of Michigan. He graduated from Farmers College with an A.B. in 1867 and from the University of Michigan with an LL.B. in 1869. In 1872, he became one of the original prospectors of the diamond fields in South Africa. At Du Toit's Pan, he opened a new digging initially called New Rush and later became the famous Colesberg Kopje in the Kimberley district. He spent time sailing around the world, spending time with the bushmen in Australia.

Wise returned to the United States in 1875. While he previously studied law at the University of Michigan, he never practiced it. Instead, he became associated with Die Deborah and The American Israelite, both of which were founded by his father. He was publisher of Die Deborah from until 1890, and from 1900 to 1928 he was managing editor and publisher of The American Israelite. He was also publisher of the American Jews' Annual, a yearly publication devoted to literature and belletristics from 1884 to 1892. He went to Washington, D.C., several times to protest Russian exclusion of American Jews who wanted to visit that country, and in 1882 he helped around 150 Jewish immigrants settle on Kansas farm lands. He established the Chicago Israelite in 1885 and served as its publisher. He also published most of his father's books.

Wise was Master of District No. 2 of B'nai B'rith and a member of the Freemasons. He attended Congregation B'nai Yeshurun. In 1886, he married Pauline Goodman. They had no children.

Wise died at his home in the Hotel Alms on January 27, 1933, within a week of his wife's death. Rabbi James G. Heller conducted the funeral service at the Weil Funeral Home. He was buried in the United Jewish Cemetery.
