= Sam Dubbin =

American lawyer

Samuel J. Dubbin (born June 26, 1955) is an American lawyer, government worker and Holocaust Survivors' rights advocate. He is a principal in the law firm Dubbin & Kravetz, L.L.P., a former shareholder in the law firm Greenberg Traurig, and a former partner with Steel Hector & Davis. A Clinton Administration appointee, he served in the Department of Justice and Department of Transportation.

== Education and early career ==
Dubbin received his bachelor's degree in economics, magna cum laude, from Harvard College in 1977. In 1981, he graduated cum laude from the University of Miami School of Law, where he received the Harvey T. Reid Scholarship and served as an editor of the Law Review. After law school, Dubbin clerked for the Honorable James Lawrence King, United States District Judge for the Southern District of Florida, from 1981–1982.

== Government and community service ==
In 1996, Florida Governor Lawton Chiles appointed Dubbin to the Florida Transportation Commission. He had previously served on the Florida Supreme Court Nominating Commission, also as an appointee of Governor Chiles.

Dubbin also served from 1993 to 1996 as an official in the United States Departments of Justice and Transportation. He was special assistant to Attorney General Janet Reno and Deputy Assistant Attorney General for Policy Development in the Department of Justice, and later served as chief counsel to the National Highway Traffic Safety Administration (NHTSA) in the Department of Transportation. At NHTSA, Dubbin was the chief legal officer for the federal agency responsible for setting and enforcing motor vehicle safety and fuel economy standards, supervising rulemaking proceedings and litigation involving manufacturers, consumer groups, the insurance industry, and other interested parties.

He currently serves on the board of directors of the Greater Miami Jewish Federation, and served for over 8 years as the chairman of the Federation's Jewish Community Relations Council.

== Holocaust-related litigation ==
Dubbin's has worked on Holocaust Survivors' rights to regain assets lost to those who profited off the Holocaust. Dubbin & Kravetz represents Holocaust survivors and survivor organizations, including The Holocaust Survivors Foundation USA, Inc..

Dubbin & Kravetz was one of three firms that represented Hungarian Holocaust survivors seeking restitution and an accounting against the United States government in the Hungarian Gold Train case, which was settled for $25.5 million in 2005 after nearly five years of litigation. Dubbin testified on the issue of unhonored insurance policies that were sold to Holocaust victims before the U.S. House Committee on Financial Services in February 2008, and before the U.S. Senate Committee on Foreign Relations on May 6, 2008.
