= Jan Helcelet =

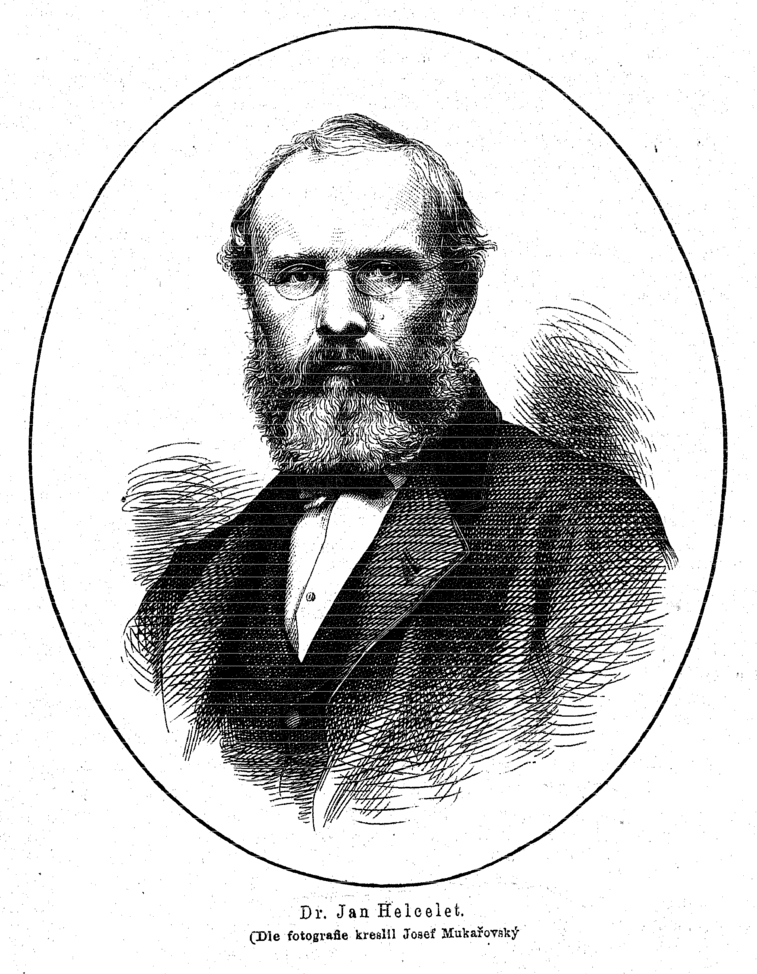
Portrait of Jan Helcelet by Josef Mukařovský (1876)

Jan Helcelet (German: Johann Helzelet; 2 January 1812 – 19 February 1878) was a Czech naturalist, journalist, revolutionary and politician. He was one of the leaders of the Old Czech Party in Moravia.

== Biography ==
Helcelet was born on 2 January 1812 in Dolní Kounice, Moravia, Austrian Empire. His family originated in the Swiss city of Porrentruy, where their name was spelled "Hölzlet". He attended the grammar schools in Brno and, after graduation, following family tradition, trained as a miller. After extensive travels throughout Silesia and Moravia, he entered the University of Vienna, where he studied medicine from 1834 to 1838, then spent a year at the University of Padua.

After obtaining his Doctorate of Medicine in 1840, he worked at St. Anne's Hospital in Brno. He was there for only a year when he became a substitute teacher at the Collegium Nobilium in Olomouc. In 1846, he became a full Professor at Palacký University Olomouc, replacing Johann Karl Nestler, who had died a few years before. There, he taught natural sciences and field management. His students at that time included Gregor Mendel and Arnošt Förchtgott. After 1848, he taught Czech literature as well.

He was also an editor at Selské noviny (Peasants' Newspaper) and, together with Ignác Jan Hanuš, co-founded the Prostonárodní Holomoucké Noviny (Nationwide Olomouc Newspaper). They printed 1,300 per week, making it the largest publication in Moravia. It was suppressed following the failure of the Revolution, during which he had become a major advocate for Czech autonomy; helping to write a petition to the Prague Slavic Congress. In 1849, he moved to Brno, where he taught at the German Technical University. From 1851 to 1858, he edited the literary magazine, Koleda (Carol).

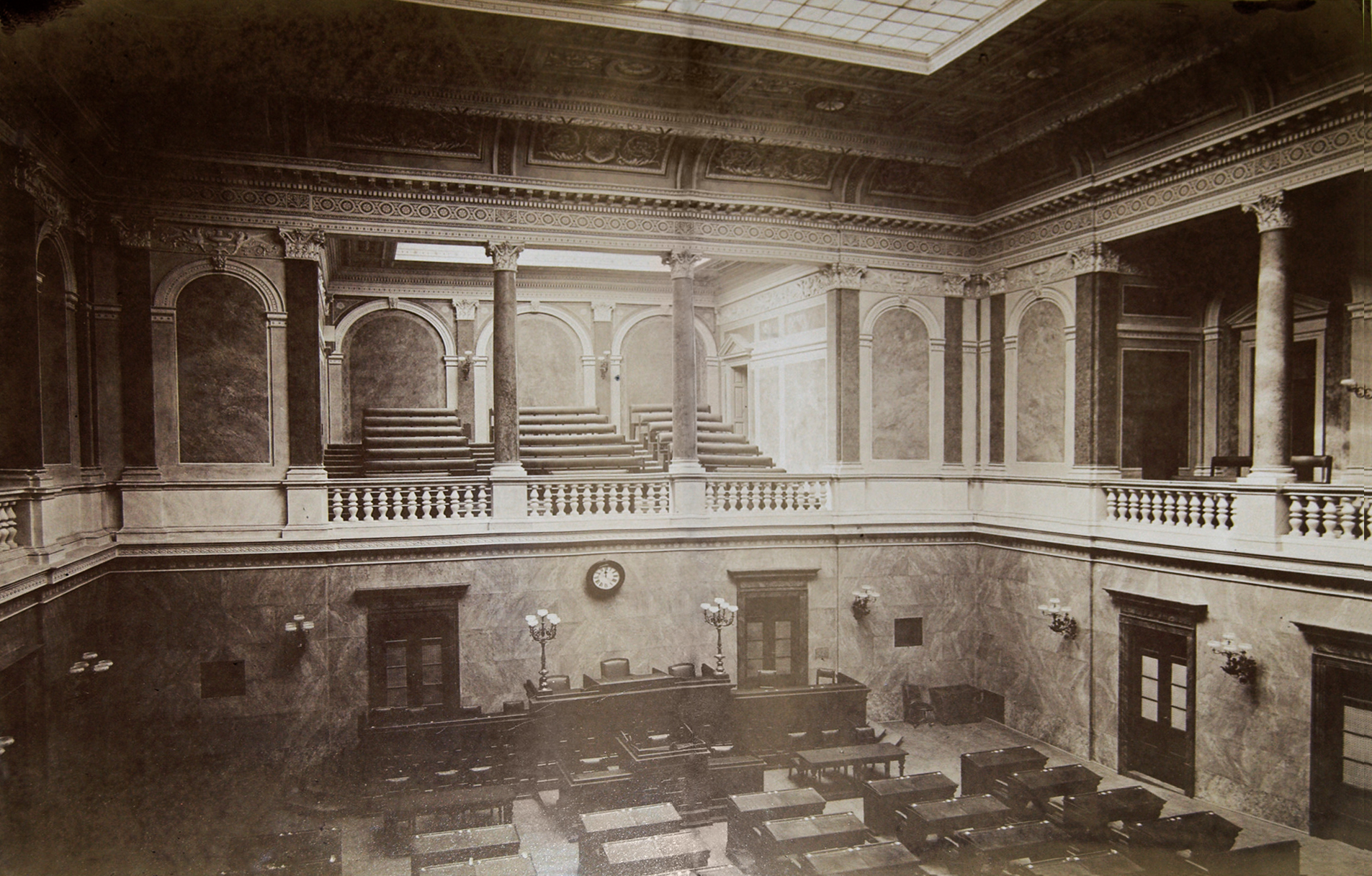
Debating Chamber at the Moravian Diet (1878)

Following the restoration of the constitutional system, he once again became involved in politics. In 1861, he joined the Election Committee of the Moravská národní strana (National Party), the Moravian branch of the Old Czech Party. From 1861 to 1873, he was a member of the Moravian Diet. In 1861, he also became a member of the Imperial Council for Dačice district; a position he resigned in 1864, although some sources say he remained until 1873.

He was also in contact with many cultural figures, some of whom he influenced. This included the aforementioned Hanuš, František Klácel and Božena Němcová. In 1862, he became a major advocate for the Sokol movement in Moravia.

He died in Brno on 19 February 1878 at the age of 66.

His son, Ctibor Helcelet, was also a politician who belonged to the Imperial Council and promoted Sokol.
