= Jewish Community Relations Council =

Public affairs organization

A Jewish Community Relations Council (JCRC) is a locally based Jewish public affairs organization that carries out "action agendas on behalf of and in the name of the local Jewish communities." Councils may aim "to represent the consensus of the organized Jewish community" in the cities in which they operate, and then assist in consulting other local stakeholders on matters of importance to Jewish community values.

Jewish Community Relations Councils (JCRC) are Jewish local advocacy arms in the United States. Most major centers of Jewish populations have a JCRC, and are either constituent departments of the local Jewish federation, totally independent, or functioning as a joint office. Typically, the board of directors of a JCRC includes local representatives of national organizations and local synagogues.

The key to the uniqueness of JCRCs compared to other Jewish communal entities is that they are locally based bodies and carry out action agendas on behalf of and in the name of the local Jewish communities.

== History ==
JCRCs came into being in the 1930s to provide a means for coordination of defense activity within a community, as local communities were not content to leave this activity solely to national defense organizations like the American Jewish Committee, American Jewish Congress, and Anti-Defamation League, which rarely consulted with each other or with local leadership. Like these national organizations, JCRCs focused primarily on combatting antisemitism.

In 1944, the National Community Relations Advisory Council (later renamed the Jewish Council for Public Affairs (JCPA) was formed as an umbrella organization of 14 local JCRCs, the ADL, the American Jewish Committee, the American Jewish Congress, and the Jewish Labor Committee, in the United States. In 2000, the JCPA counted among its membership 120 JCRCs. The affiliation was formally terminated in 2022 as JCPA became an independent organization no longer representing the JCRCs.

According to Professor Daniel Elazar, from the 1950s, the JCRCs with the JCPA and federations played the largest role in Jewish representation. Their importance increased by the early 21st century as Jewish organizational life, along with national life in general, became more and more decentralized.

== Minnesota and the Dakotas ==
Jewish Community Relations Council of Minnesota and the Dakotas
- Abbreviation: JCRC
- Founded: 1938; 88 years ago
- Type: 501(c)(3)
- Tax ID no.: 41-0826434
- Legal status: Nonprofit organization
- Purpose: To protect Jewish interests and promote Jewish ideals through various programs.
- Headquarters: Minneapolis, Minnesota, U.S.
- Coordinates: 44.975083°N 93.280668°W
- Region served: Minnesota, North Dakota, South Dakota
- President: Judy Cook
- Revenue: $1,604,764 (2019)
- Expenses: $1,505,225
- Endowment: $58,500 _{(2019)}
- Employees: 12 (2018)
- Volunteers: 267 (2018)
- Website: minndakjcrc.org
- Formerly called: Anti-Defamation Council of Minnesota

The Jewish Community Relations Council of Minnesota and the Dakotas is an organization dedicated to serving as the public affairs voice of the local Jewish communities of Minnesota and the Dakotas.

The organization now known as the Jewish Community Relations Council of Minnesota and the Dakotas first took shape in 1938 as the Anti-Defamation Council of Minnesota, soon renamed the Minnesota Jewish Council under the leadership of Samuel Scheiner. Scheiner reviewed reports of antisemitic incidents, fighting against locally distributed hate-filled leaflets and anti-Jewish remarks, while also attempting to expose discrimination by real estate agents and employers who attempted to subvert anti-discrimination laws. The rise of antisemitism in the 1930s—from the American Nationalist group the Silver Legion of America, or Silver Shirts, to a volatile gubernatorial political campaign in 1938 with an overtly antisemitic campaign against Elmer Benson—galvanized the state's Jewish community to action. Through the Second World War, the group continued to combat rising interreligious and intergroup tension while also raising concern over employment discrimination directed against Jews.

In autumn 1946, an issue of Common Ground by Carey McWilliams, titled "Minneapolis: The Curious Twin" asserted that "Minneapolis is the capitol of anti-Semitism in the United States. In almost every walk of life, 'an iron curtain' separates Jews from non-Jews in Minneapolis." By 1947, the City Council of Minneapolis banned the dissemination hate literature and Minneapolis mayor Hubert H. Humphrey ordered an assessment of "intergroup relations" led by a collaboration of the NAACP, League of Women Voters, and the Minnesota Jewish Council. By 1952, overt antisemitic acts were on the decline.

After the State of Israel was established in 1948, support of this new Jewish state was integrated into their work. By 1959 the group changed its name to the Jewish Community Relations Council of Minnesota (JCRC).

=== Modern advocacy ===
When Samuel Scheiner retired in 1974, new director Morton Ryweck ushered in a new era, merging with the local B'nai B'rith Anti-Defamation League (ADL) to form the JCRC/ADL. Ryweck retired in 1991. The 1970s and 1980s saw a rise of advocacy work as part of the Soviet Jewry Movement with JCRC one of the most active groups nationally working to support Soviet Jews trying to emigrate.

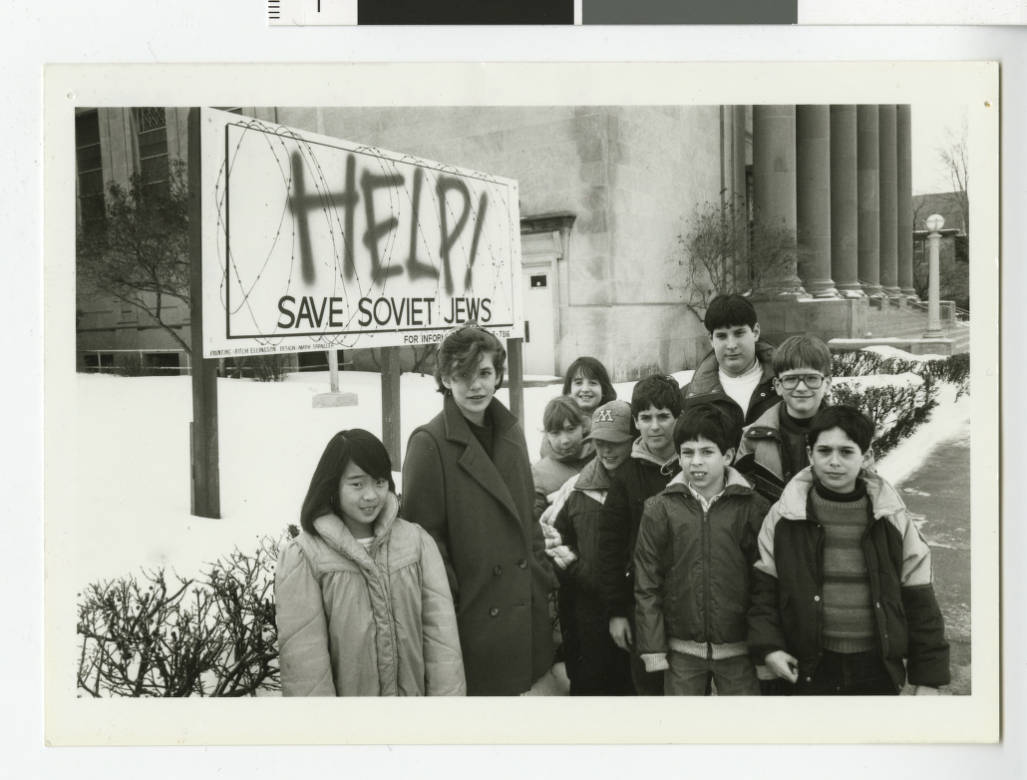
Children in front of signage at Temple Israel alerting the public to the plight of Soviet Jews. March 1987.

By 2013 the JCRC of Minnesota and the Dakotas became independent of ADL. Jewish Community Relations Council of Minnesota and the Dakotas continues to monitor and combat violations of church-state separation in public schools, work to promote legislation to answer the needs of the underprivileged in Minnesota, and works as part of the Joint Religious Legislative Coalition. Its Tolerance Minnesota project provides diversity and Holocaust educational resources for parents and teachers.

In 2024, JCRC spoke critically against the University of Minnesota's job offer to Raz Segal to lead the Center for Holocaust and Genocide Studies, a position that interfaces with the local Jewish community; Segal caused controversy within the Jewish community by referring to Israel’s actions in the Gaza war following the 2023 October 7 attacks as a genocide.

== See also ==
- Jewish Federations of North America
- Sam Dubbin
- David A. Rose
- Robert E. Segal
