= Dolní Kounice =

- Town
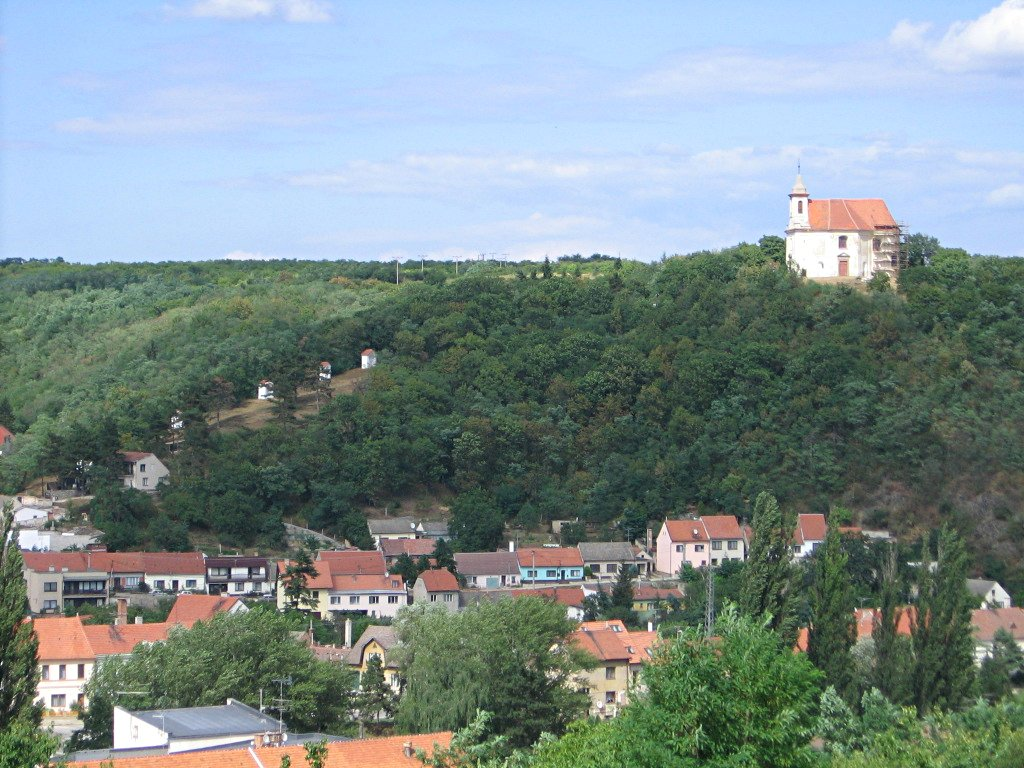
- Chapel of St. Anthony above the town

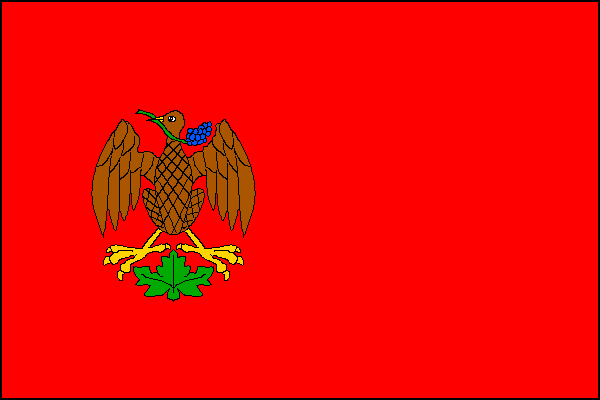
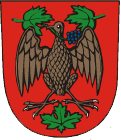
- Flag Coat of arms

- Location in the Czech Republic
- Coordinates: 49°4′13″N 16°27′54″E
- Country: Czech Republic
- Region: South Moravian
- District: Brno-Country
- First mentioned: 1183

Government
  - Mayor: Lenka Žikešová

Area
  - Total: 8.97 km^{2} (3.46 sq mi)
- Elevation: 195 m (640 ft)

Population (2026-01-01)
  - Total: 2,635
  - Density: 294/km^{2} (761/sq mi)
- Time zone: UTC+1 (CET)
  - Summer (DST): UTC+2 (CEST)
- Postal code: 664 64
- Website: www.dolnikounice.cz

Dolní Kounice (Czech pronunciation: [ˈdolɲiː ˈkouɲɪtsɛ]; German: Kanitz) is a town in Brno-Country District in the South Moravian Region of the Czech Republic. It has about 2,600 inhabitants. It is located in the valley of the Jihlava River.

The most notable noble owners of Dolní Kounice were the Dietrichstein family, who ruled the town in 1622–1862. Dolní Kounice is known for the oldest convent in Moravia, founded in 1183, but it was abolished in the 16th century and is now a ruin. The main landmark of the town is the Dolní Kounice Castle.

== Etymology ==
The name Kounice is derived from the personal name Kúna (a pet form of the name Konrád), meaning "the village of Kúna's people". The prefix Dolní ('lower') distinguished the settlement from nearby Horní Kounice ('upper Kounice').

== Geography ==
Dolní Kounice is located about 16 kilometres (10 mi) southwest of Brno. It lies in the Bobrava Highlands. The highest point is at 335 m (1,099 ft) above sea level. The town is situated in the valley of the Jihlava River.

== History ==
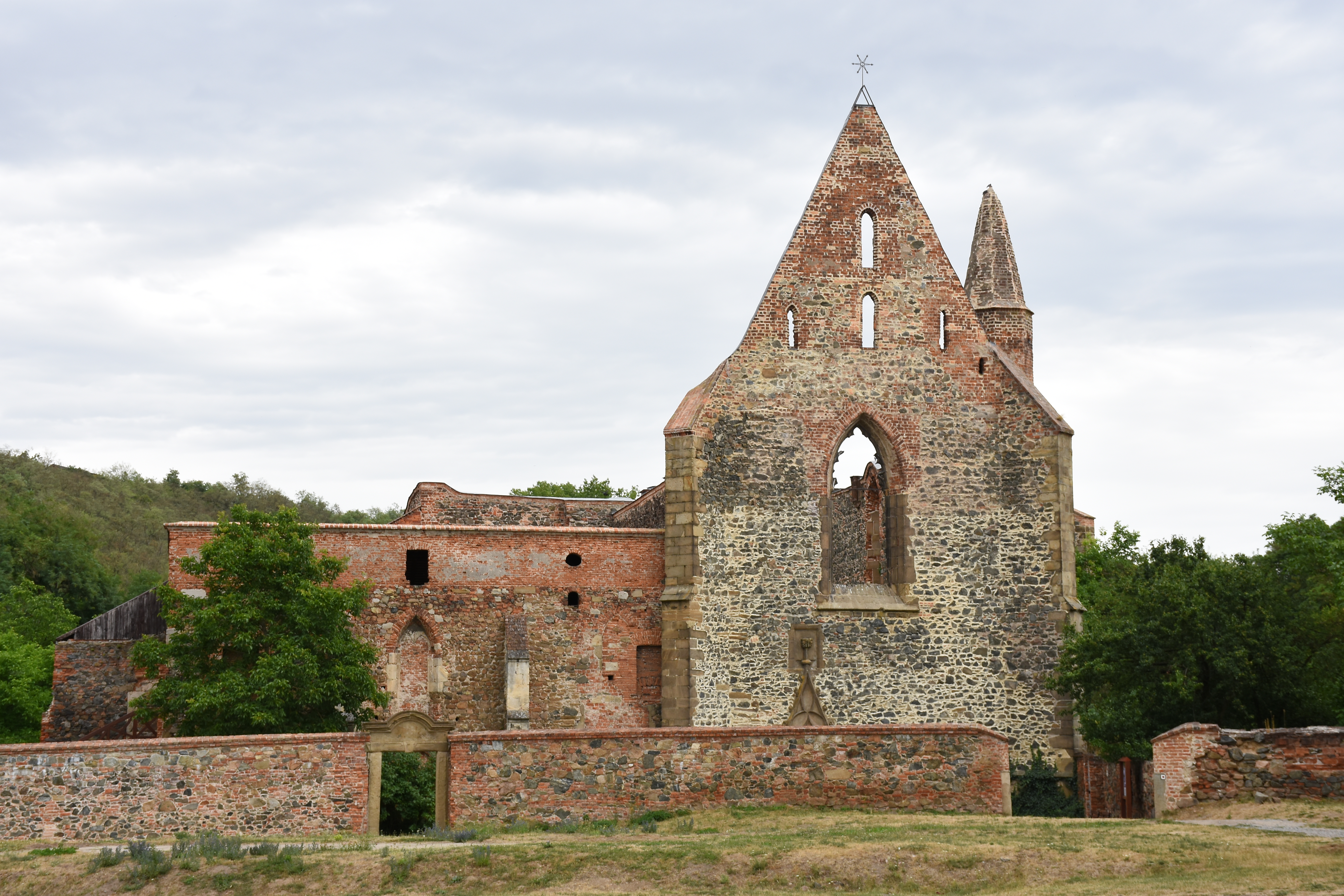
Ruins of the convent

The first written mention of Kounice is from 1183, when the Premonstratensian Rosa coeli convent was built here. It was founded in 1181 and was the oldest convent in Moravia. A church already stood here in 1183. In 1284–1330, a Gothic castle was built by the convent on a hill above the village. Since the 15th century, the village has been named Dolní Kounice.

In 1527, the convent was abolished. An attempt was made to restore it in 1702, but a year later it was destroyed by a fire and never restored again.

From 1537, the estate was owned by various noble families. In 1571, Dolní Kounice was promoted to a town and obtained coat of arms. During the rule of the Drnovský of Drnovice family in 1588–1622, the castle was rebuilt into a Renaissance fortified residence. During the Thirty Years' War in 1622, the castle was burned down, and was repaired in 1682 in the Baroque style. From 1622 to 1862, Dolní Kounice Castle with the estate was property of the Dietrichstein family, which was its most famous and longest owners.

In 1964, Dolní Kounice lost the title a town. The title was returned to it in 1998.

== Demographics ==
Historical population

Year	Pop.	±%
1869	2,967	—
1880	2,802	−5.6%
1890	2,928	+4.5%
1900	3,076	+5.1%
1910	3,300	+7.3%

Year	Pop.	±%
1921	3,054	−7.5%
1930	3,130	+2.5%
1950	2,625	−16.1%
1961	2,661	+1.4%
1970	2,524	−5.1%

Year	Pop.	±%
1980	2,322	−8.0%
1991	2,195	−5.5%
2001	2,306	+5.1%
2011	2,436	+5.6%
2021	2,385	−2.1%

Source: Censuses

== Transport ==
There are no railways or major roads passing through the municipality. The town is served by the train station in neighbouring Moravské Bránice.

== Sights ==
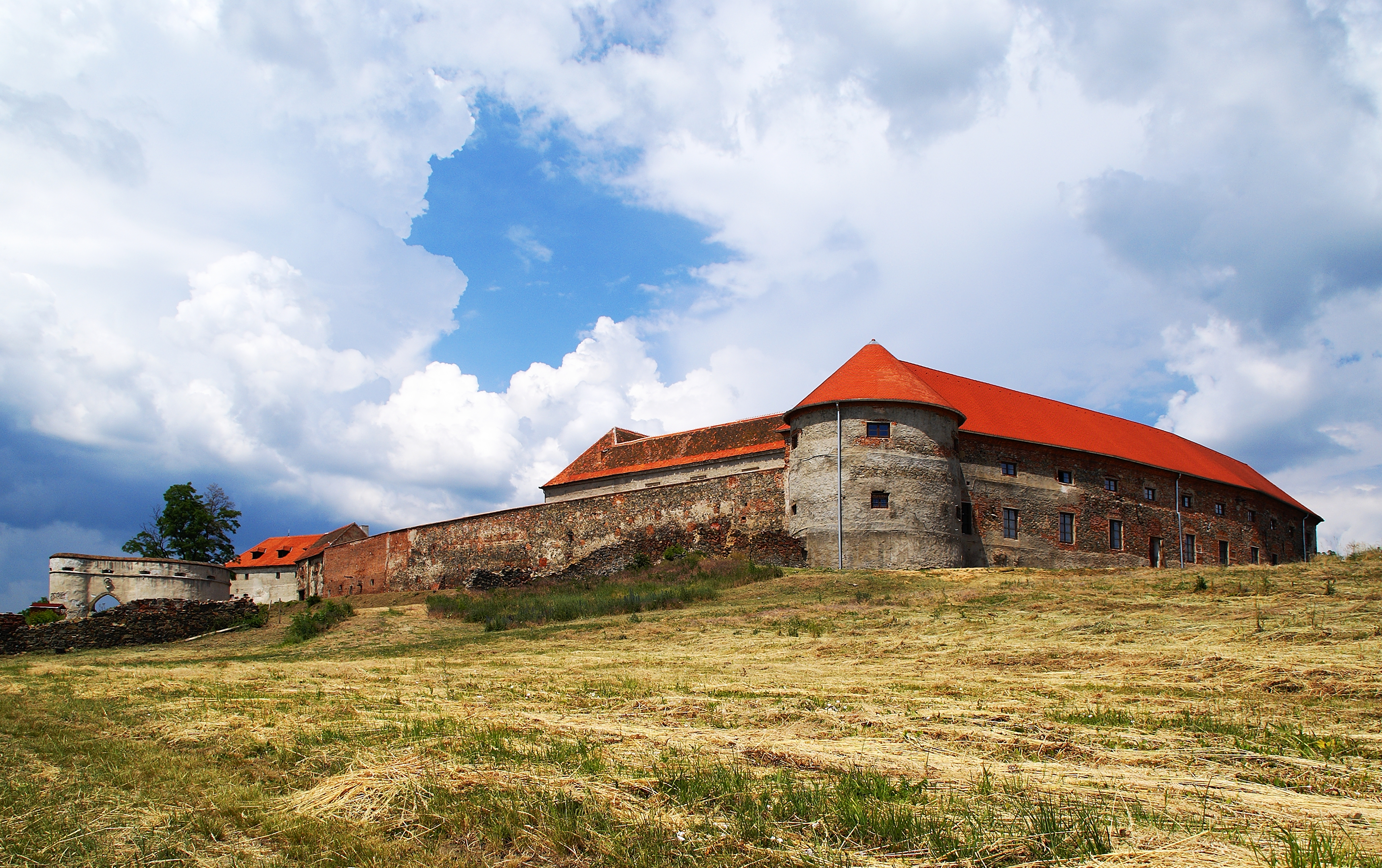
Dolní Kounice Castle

Dolní Kounice is known for the Gothic-Renaissance castle and for ruins of the convent. The castle is gradually being repaired and since 2007 has been open to the public.

The Church of Saints Peter and Paul on the town square is a neo-Renaissance structure, built in 1877–1879. The Chapel of Saint Anthony is a landmark above the town. The way to the pilgrimage chapel is lined by Stations of the Cross.

There are several monument commemorating the Jewish community in the town. The Dolní Kounice Synagogue was built in the early Baroque style in 1652–1655 and is one of the oldest synagogues in Moravia. The Jewish cemetery was founded in 1680.

== Notable people ==
- Gotthard Deutsch (1859–1921), Austrian scholar
- Jan Helcelet (1812–1878), naturalist and politician
- Antonín Brabec (1946–2017), canoeist

== Twin towns – sister cities ==
Dolní Kounice is twinned with:

- Azay-le-Brûlé, France
- Caprese Michelangelo, Italy

== Gallery ==
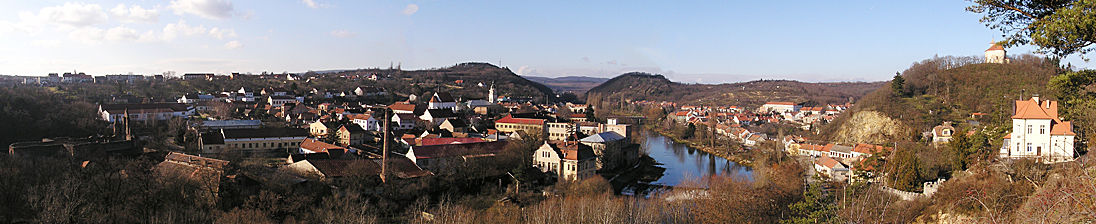
Dolní Kounice Panorama
