= The Akron Press =

Defunct Ohio newspaper

- Type: Newspaper (defunct)
- Editor: L. E. Judd (circa 1921)
- Founded: 1898
- Language: English
- Ceased publication: 1925 (merged to form The Times‑Press)
- Headquarters: Akron, Ohio

The Akron Press was a newspaper serving Akron, Ohio. It was founded in 1898.

It began as the Akron edition of the Cleveland Press Penny, printed in Cleveland and transported to Akron by train. It gained local flavor when it began being printed in Akron. By 1903 it was described as distinct.

By the early 1920s it was competing with the Akron Times. The two then joined together on March 14, 1925 to become The Times-Press, as the town was not big enough for both.

L. E. Judd, from circa 1921, was editor of the combined newspaper. Its stereotyping department was headed by Joseph J. Metker, an international stereotyper, and in 1929 his son Robert succeeded him. In 1923, for a brief period, Henry C. Segal worked as a reporter for the Akron Press. In 1927, the newspaper was renamed the Akron Times-Press and existed until 1938.
