= Isaac M. Wise Temple =

Reform synagogue in Cincinnati, Ohio, US

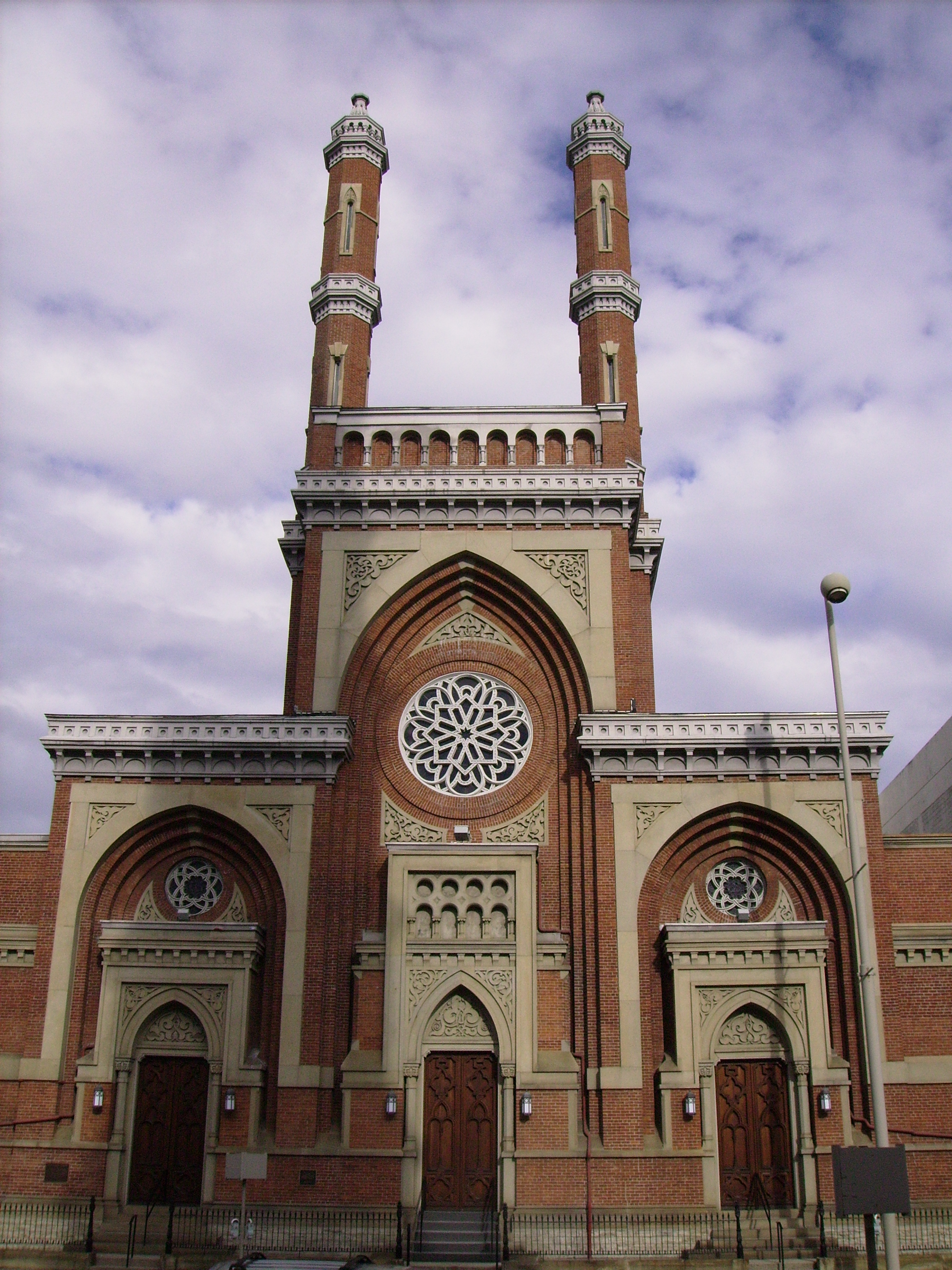
- Isaac M. Wise Temple in 2006

- Location in Ohio

Religion
- Affiliation: Reform Judaism
- Ecclesiastical or organisational status: Synagogue
- Leadership: Rabbi Neil P.G. Hirsch; Rabbi Zachary S. Goodman (Associate); Rabbi Lewis Kamrass, Emeritus
- Status: Active

Location
- Location: Plum Street: 720 Plum Street, Cincinnati, Ohio; Amberley Village: 8329 Ridge Road, Cincinnati, Ohio 45236
- Country: United States
- Coordinates: 39°6′13″N 84°31′5″W (Plum Street)

Architecture
- Architect: James Keys Wilson
- Type: Synagogue architecture
- Style: Byzantine Revival; Moorish Revival
- Established: 1841 (as a congregation)
- Completed: 1866
- Construction cost: $275,000
- Minaret: Two

Website
- wisetemple.org
- Plum Street Temple
- U.S. National Register of Historic Places
- U.S. National Historic Landmark
- Cincinnati Local Historic Landmark
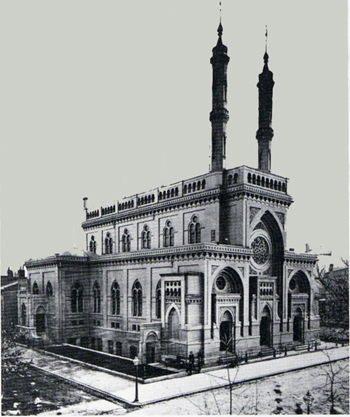
- Early 20th century photo of the Plum Street Temple
- Area: less than one acre
- NRHP reference No.: 72001021

Significant dates
- Added to NRHP: December 27, 1972
- Designated NHL: May 15, 1975

The Isaac M. Wise Temple (formerly the Plum Street Temple), commonly called the Wise Temple, is an historic Reform Jewish congregation and synagogue located in Cincinnati, Ohio, United States. The congregation's historic Plum Street temple was erected in honour of Rabbi Isaac Mayer Wise, who was among the founders of Reform Judaism in the United States. The temple building was designed by prominent Cincinnati architect James Keys Wilson and its design was inspired by the Alhambra at Granada.

The temple is located at 720 Plum Street in Cincinnati and was built chiefly during the Civil War at a cost of $275,000 ($6.05 million in 2025) by members of the Lodge Street Synagogue. The temple was dedicated on Friday, August 24, 1866, and is among the oldest synagogue buildings in the United States. The temple is across Plum Street from the historic Saint Peter In Chains Cathedral and next to the site of the former St. Paul Episcopal Cathedral, which was demolished in 1937. In 1972, the Plum Street Temple was placed on the National Register of Historic Places, and it was designated a National Historic Landmark in 1975 for its architecture and its role in the Reform movement.

In 1976, the congregation expanded its facilities to include a new synagogue, community center, and school located in Amberley Village.

== History ==
In 1840, a group of German Jewish immigrants in Cincinnati organized as a separate congregation, K.K. B'nai Yeshurun, breaking away from the existing congregation, K. K. Bene Israel. Their first place of worship was in a home on Third Street, between Sycamore and Broadway. In 1841 the congregation purchased and renovated for use as a house of worship a Federal-style, brick, four-story row house on Lodge Street.

The congregation built its first synagogue in 1848 on Lodge Street in the Gothic Revival style. The Lodge Street Synagogue was dedicated on September 22, 1848, in Cincinnati, Ohio.

The congregation voted in 1853 to engage Rabbi Isaac Mayer Wise as its spiritual leader; this congregation built the Plum Street Temple beginning in 1865. Prior to the Civil War, the 200 families of K. K. B'nai Yeshurun (Isaac M. Wise Temple) envisioned a magnificent building to house their growing twenty-year-old congregation that had already gained a national prominence because of their famed rabbi, Isaac Mayer Wise. Plum Street Temple was built primarily during the Civil War, at a cost of $275,000. Plum Street Temple was dedicated on Friday, August 24, 1866. The original ledger book with all the entries of specific costs entailed in the construction of Plum Street Temple was found in the early 21st century. A commemorative march for piano, called The Progress March, by P. Martens, was published by J. L. Peters. The temple is featured prominently on the cover.

Charles S. Levi served as Associate Rabbi with Wise from 1889 to 1898. Louis Grossmann succeeded Wise and served as the Temple's rabbi from 1898 to 1922. James G. Heller was rabbi of the Temple from 1920 to 1952.

In 1972 Sally Priesand was ordained in the Plum Street Temple. Priesand was the first female rabbi ordained by a rabbinical seminary in the United States, and the second formally ordained female rabbi in Jewish history, after Regina Jonas of Germany in 1935.

The Plum Street Temple was listed on the National Register of Historic Places in 1972; and designated as a National Historic Landmark in 1975.

In 1976, the congregation opened the Isaac M. Wise Center on Ridge Road in Amberley Village.

The synagogue uses two siddurim (prayer books) for services, the Mishkan T'filah and their own congregational siddur edition, Avodat HaLev. The machzor is Mishkan Hanefesh.

== Gallery ==
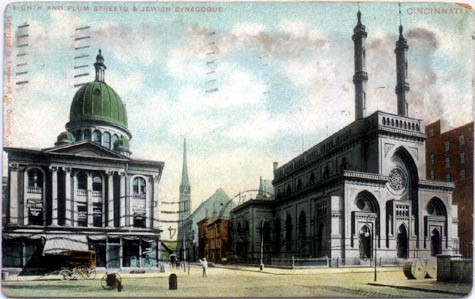
Postcard of St. Paul Episcopal Cathedral (razed 1937) and Plum Street Temple

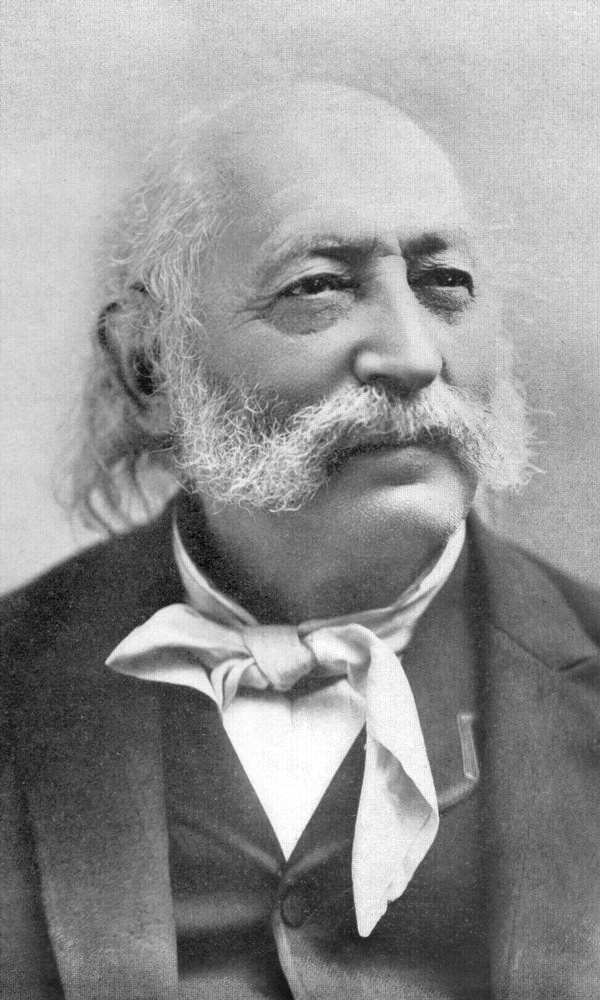
Isaac M. Wise, rabbi of the Plum Street Temple

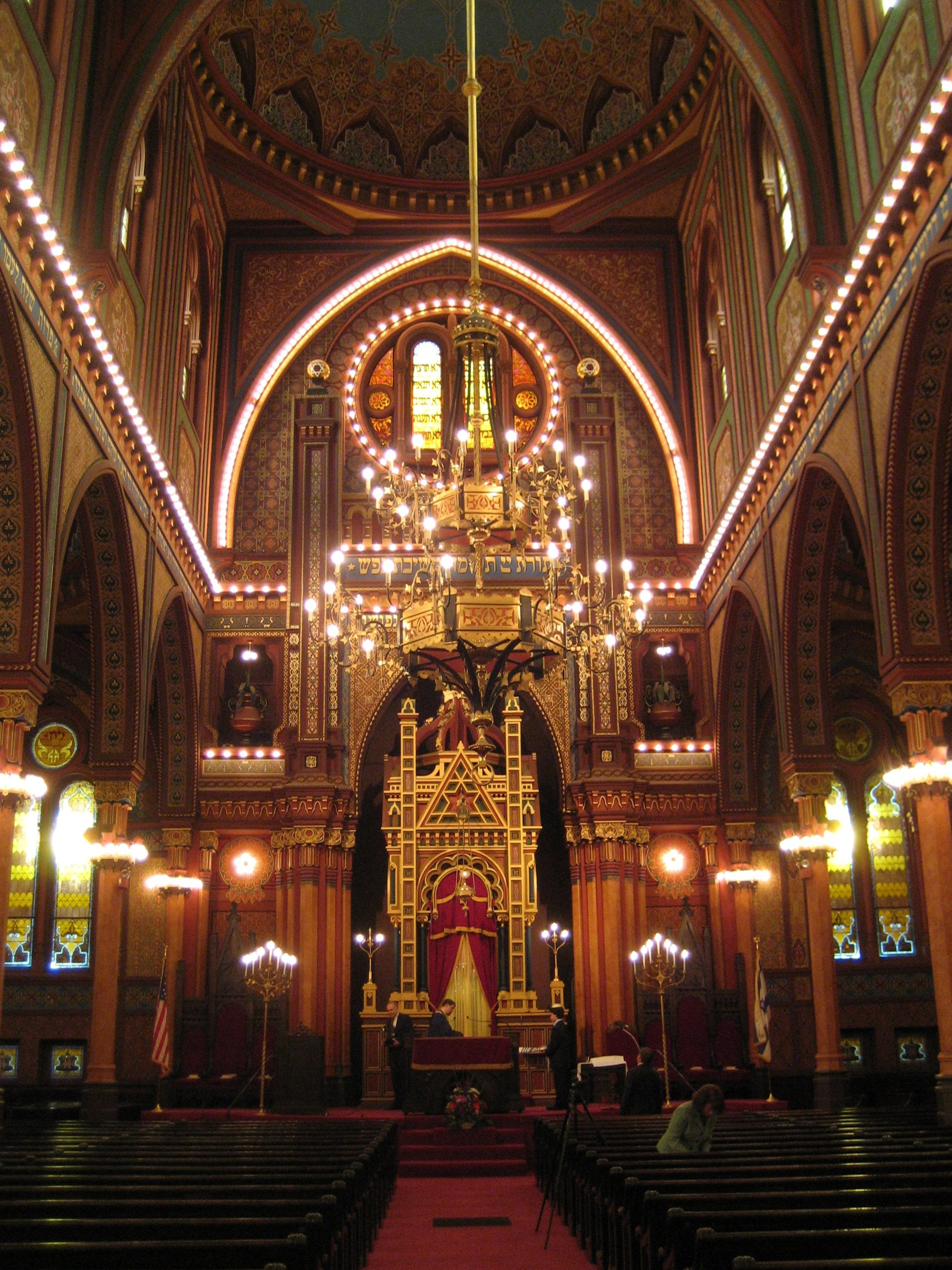
Interior

A closeup view of the façade and white alabaster Mudéjar Window

Plum Street Temple's National Historic Landmark sign

The temple's cornerstone dedication.

The Ohio Historical Marker of the Plum Street Temple.

== See also ==
- List of Cincinnati Local Historic Landmarks
- List of National Historic Landmarks in Ohio
- National Register of Historic Places listings in Cincinnati
- Oldest synagogues in the United States
