= Isaac Mayer Wise =

American rabbi, editor and author (1819–1900)

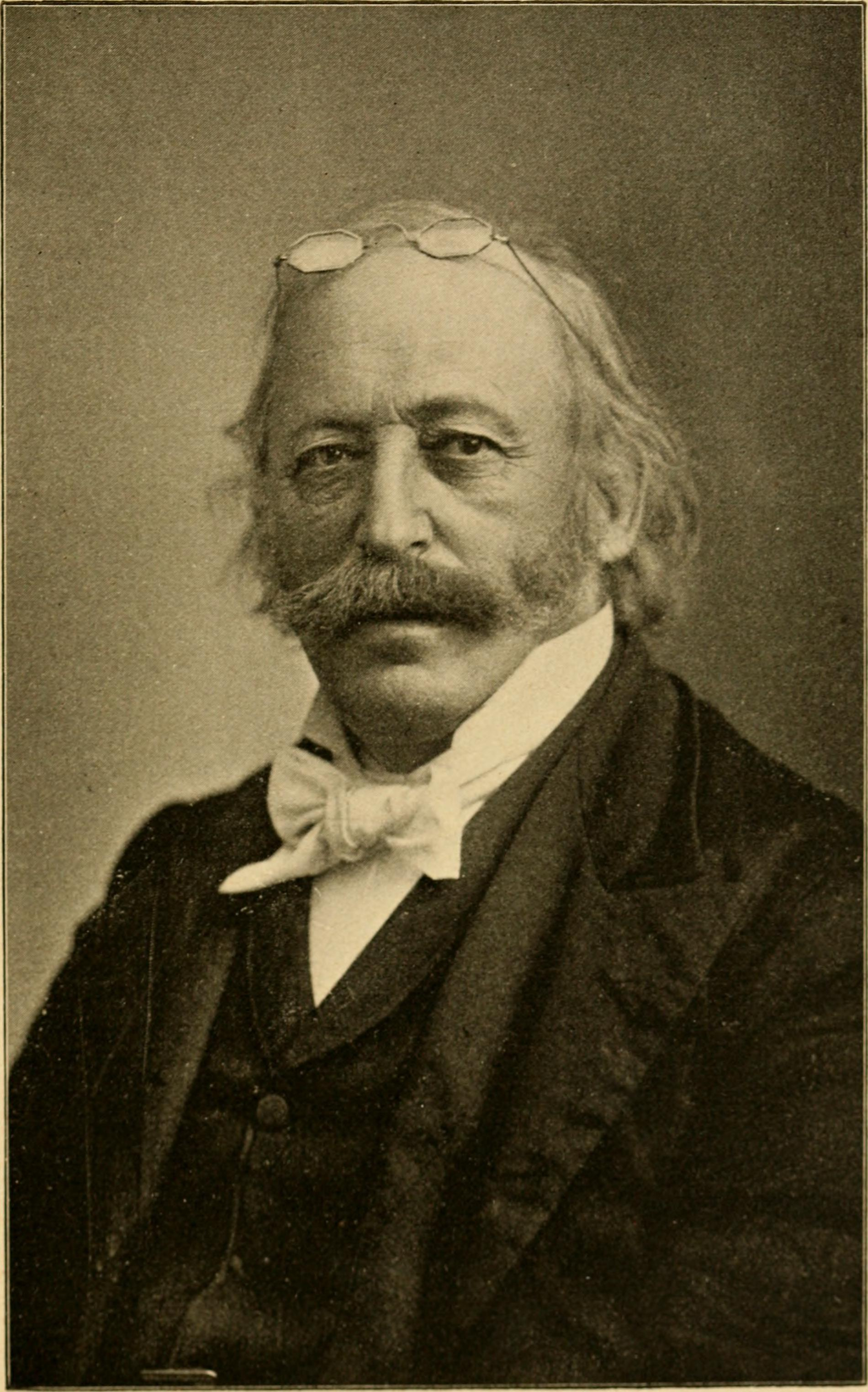
- Wise in 1893

1st President of Hebrew Union College
- In office 3 October 1875 – 26 March 1900
- Preceded by: Office established
- Succeeded by: Moses Mielziner

Personal details
- Born: Isaac Mayer Weiss; 29 March 1819 Steingrub, Kingdom of Bohemia (now Plesná, Czech Republic
- Died: 26 March 1900 (aged 80) Cincinnati, Ohio, U.S.
- Spouse(s): Therese Bloch (died 1874) Selma Bondi (m. 1876)
- Children: 14, including Leo Wise and Jonah Bondi Wise

Isaac Mayer Wise (29 March 1819 – 26 March 1900) was an American Reform rabbi, editor, and author.

== Early life ==
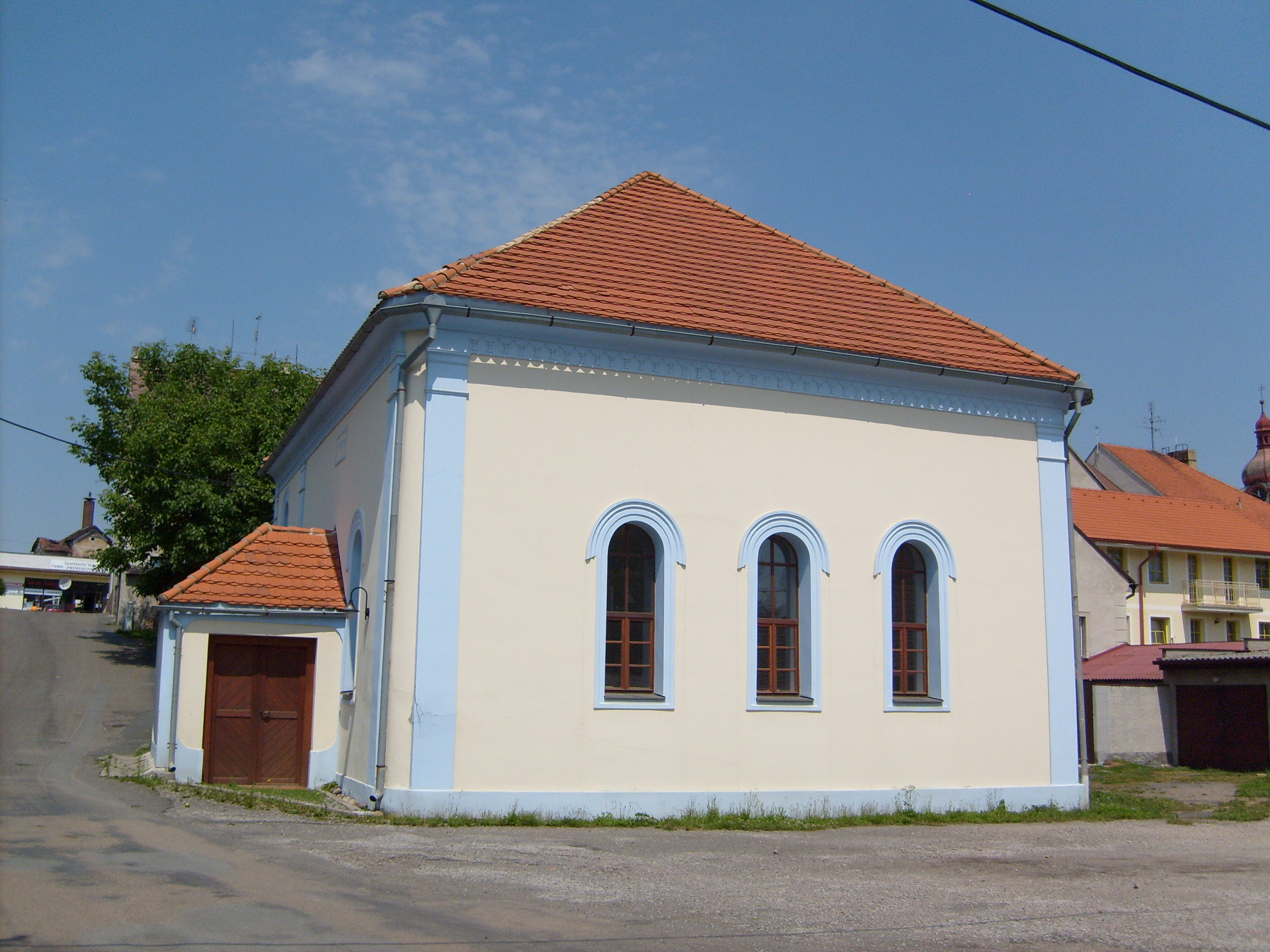
The Synagogue in Radnice, where Wise was a rabbi in 1843–1846

Wise was born on 29 March 1819 in Steingrub in Bohemia (today Lomnička, a part of Plesná in the Czech Republic). He was the son of Löbl Doktor and Regina Weiss; since his parents weren't civilly married, he went by his mother's surname. He received his early Hebrew education from his father and grandfather, later continuing his Hebrew and secular studies in Prague.

He may have received the hattarat hora'ah from the Prague bet din, composed of Rabbis Rapoport, Samuel Freund, and E. L. Teweles, or from Rabbi Falk Kohn, however there is debate as to whether he was an ordained rabbi at all. It was even a source of controversy with his intellectual rival, Rabbi David Einhorn.

In 1843, he was appointed rabbi at Radneitz (now Radnice near Plzeň), where he remained for about two years. In 1846, Weis emigrated to the United States, arriving on 23 July. He changed the spelling of his surname to Wise.

== Reforms in Albany ==
In October 1846, Wise was appointed rabbi of Congregation Beth-El of Albany, New York. His eight years in that position has been described as "crucial period of his existence" and his "storm and stress period". During this time, he conceived many of his later projects. Soon after his appointment, Wise began with reforms. His congregation was the first American synagogue to:

- Count women in minyan (religious quorum).
- Allow men and women to sit together in family pews, doing away with the mechitza. (Another source says this first happened in 1851 at Anshe Emeth.)
- Eliminate the bar mitzvah tradition and replace it with a later confirmation ceremony at a more informed age than 13 that allows for both boys and girls (at age 12) to participate.
- Have a mixed-sex choir.

In 1850, Wise had famously remarked in reply to a question brought during a public forum with an Orthodox rabbi at Kahal Kadosh Beth Elohim in Charleston, South Carolina, that he did not believe in the coming of the Messiah or the resurrection of the dead. A letter from the Charleston congregation documenting his statements was published, and the leaders of his synagogue Beth-El were outraged. As a result, the trustees of the synagogue dismissed him; Wise did not accept his dismissal. At the following day's service, the first day of Rosh Hashanah, at the moment when the Torah scroll was being removed from the ark, an altercation broke out between opponents and defenders of Wise. The chaos was so pronounced that the sheriff was called—he cleared the synagogue, locked the doors, and took the keys. This was the end of Wise's position at Temple Beth-El.

Supporters of Wise formed a new congregation, Anshe Emeth. Wise remained with this congregation until 1854. In January 1852, Wise was Chaplain of the Legislature of the State of New York, a position supporters, including then-New York Senator William H. Seward, helped him get as Anshe Emeth was unable to pay a full salary. During this time, Wise worked on his History of the Israelitish Nation, which he stated was based on "such facts as are able to stand the test of criticism", eliminating miracles, dogmas, and doctrines, and as a general principle, distinguishing religion from history. Unable to find a publisher, he printed it at his own expense with help from friends. As he put it, "it fell into the orthodox camps like a veritable bomb".

== Minhag America ==
In 1847, at the suggestion of Max Lilienthal, who was at that time stationed in New York, a bet din was formed, which was to act in the capacity of an advisory committee to the congregations of the country, without, however, exercising hierarchic powers. As members of this bet din, Lilienthal named Wise and two others besides himself. At a meeting held in the spring of 1847, Wise submitted to the bet din the manuscript of a siddur to be titled the Minhag America and to be used by all the congregations of the country. No action was taken, however, until the Cleveland Conference of 1855, when a committee consisting of Wise, Rothenberg, and Isidor Kalisch was appointed to edit the siddur. This book appeared under the title Minhag America, and was practically Wise's work; it was adopted by most of the congregations of the Western and Southern states. So pronounced was Wise's desire for unity that when in 1894 the Union Prayer Book was published by the Central Conference of American Rabbis, he voluntarily retired the Minhag America from his own congregation.

As early as 1848 Wise issued a call to the "ministers and other Israelites" of the United States, urging them to form a union which might put an end to the Jewish disunity in the United States. His call appeared in the columns of The Occident, and was ably seconded by its editor, Isaac Leeser. Wise suggested that a meeting be held in the spring of 1849 in Philadelphia to establish a union of the congregations of the entire country. This meeting did not take place, but the originator of the idea never ceased advocating it, especially after he had established his own newspaper, The Israelite, in 1854 (renamed The American Israelite in 1874). In its columns he tirelessly expounded his views upon the subject. His persistence won its reward when in 1873, twenty-five years after he had first broached the idea, the Union of American Hebrew Congregations was organized in Cincinnati.

== Move to Cincinnati ==
In 1853 Wise was offered a position as rabbi of the Beth K.K B’nai Jeshurun congregation of the Lodge Street Synagogue of Cincinnati, Ohio. He accepted on condition that it be a lifetime appointment, which the congregation agreed to. He offered to release the congregation when his controversial History of the Israelitish Nation appeared months later, but the synagogue maintained its support for him. He moved to Cincinnati in April 1854, and was rabbi of that congregation for the remaining 46 years of his life.

Shortly after his move, he began the weekly newspaper The Israelite (after 1874 The American Israelite), and a German-language supplement for women, Die Deborah. Wise was above all an organizer, and called numerous institutions into being. He organized the building of the Plum Street Temple in 1866. The temple, noted for its architectural grandeur, was renamed the Isaac M. Wise Temple in his honor.

== Hebrew Union College ==
Earnest as he was in proclaiming the necessity for union among the congregations, he was equally indefatigable in insisting upon the pressing need of a theological seminary for the training of rabbis for American pulpits. In his Reminiscences he gives a vivid picture of the incompetency of many of the men who posed as spiritual guides of congregations, during his early days in the United States. He had scarcely arrived in Cincinnati when, with his characteristic energy, he set to work to establish a college in which young men could receive a Jewish education. He enlisted the interest and support of a number of influential Jews of Cincinnati and adjacent towns, and in 1855 founded the Zion Collegiate Association. The venture, however, proved a failure, and the society did not succeed in opening a college. Not daunted, Wise entered upon a literary campaign, and year in and year out he presented the subject in the columns of The Israelite. Starting in 1868 the project benefited from the administrative skills of Jacob Ezekiel. His indomitable perseverance was crowned with success when, on 3 October 1875, the Hebrew Union College opened its doors for the reception of students, four of whom were ordained eight years later. In a famous incident, the 1883 "Trefa Banquet" for this first graduating class included a number of non-kosher foods; Wise was probably not responsible for it, but he refused to condemn it, and criticism from him and his movement of what he called "kitchen Judaism" spurred the splitting-off of Conservative Judaism from Reform.

== Rabbinical conferences ==
The first outcome of Wise's agitation for union among the Jews was the Cleveland Conference held in 1855, and convened at his initiative. This conference was unfortunate, for, instead of uniting the rabbis of all parts of the country in a bond of fellowship, it gave rise to strained relations between Wise and his followers on one side, and prominent rabbis in the eastern part of the country on the other side. These differences were partly removed during the rabbinical conference of Philadelphia (1869), which Wise attended. The New York conference of 1870, and the Cincinnati conference of 1871 were efforts in the same direction; but a controversy ensuing from the latter served only to widen the breach. Yet was the great "unionist" not discouraged. He continued agitating for a synod which was to be the central body of authority for American Judaism. In 1881 he submitted to the meeting of the Rabbinical Literary Association a report urging the formation of a synod; but the matter never passed beyond the stage of discussion. However, he lived to see the establishment of the Central Conference of American Rabbis in 1889, which was the third enduring offspring of his tireless energy and unfailing perseverance. During the last eleven years of his life he served as president of the conference which he had called into existence.

Besides the arduous labors that the organization of these national institutions entailed, Wise was active in many other ways. In 1857, when a new treaty was to be concluded between the United States and Switzerland, he visited Washington as chairman of a delegation to protest against the ratification of this treaty unless Switzerland should cease its discrimination against American Jews. In his own city, besides officiating as rabbi of the Bene Yeshurun congregation and as president of the Hebrew Union College, he edited the American Israelite and the Deborah, served as an examiner of teachers applying for positions in public schools, and was also a member of the board of directors of the University of Cincinnati. He traveled throughout the United States, lecturing, dedicating synagogues, and enlisting the interest of the Jewish communities in his plans and projects.

== Jewish-Christian relations ==
As part of a program to defend Judaism against the inroads of Christianity, while refusing to demonize it, Isaac Mayer Wise offered innovative and influential views of the founding figures of Christianity. He was among the earliest Jewish scholars to reclaim Jesus as a Jew, and, more controversially, to suggest that Paul was in fact the Talmudic figure Acher.

== Anti-Zionism ==
Wise opposed a Jewish return to Palestine, preferring Jews instead to make America their home. He therefore, along with others in the Reform movement, opposed the growing Zionist movement which advocated for the establishment of the Jewish state of Israel.

== Slavery ==
Wise has been criticized for his attitude toward slavery. In "On the Provisional Portion of the Mosaic Code, with Special Reference to Polygamy and Slavery", an article from 1864 whose opening sentence is: "It is evident that Moses was opposed to slavery", Wise said that it was not necessarily wrong

to purchase savages... and secure them the benefit of civilized society... The negro race... might reap the benefit of its enslaved members, if the latter or the best instructed among them were sent back to the interior of Africa."

== Personal life ==
Wise was married twice. His first wife was Therese Bloch, sister of Edward H. Bloch, the founder of Bloch Publishing Company. They had 10 children eight of whom were living at the time of his death: Emily Wise May; Leo Wise; Julius Wise; Ida Wise Bernheim; Isidor Wise; Helen Wise Molony; Iphigene Miriam Wise Ochs, married to Adolph Ochs; and Harry Wise. She died in 1874. In 1876, he married Selma Bondi; they had four children: Elsie Corrine Wise; Rabbi Jonah Bondi Wise; Regina Wise May; and Isaac M. Wise.

Wise had no close relation to Rabbi Stephen Samuel Wise.

== Works ==
Wise wrote:

- The History of the Israelitish Nation from Abraham to the Present Time, Albany, 1854
- History of the first commonwealth of the Israelite, Cincinnati, 1860
- The Essence of Judaism, Cincinnati, 1861
- The Origin of Christianity, and a Commentary on the Acts of the Apostles, 1868
- Judaism, Its Doctrines and Duties, 1872
- The Martyrdom of Jesus of Nazareth: a Historico-Critical Treatise on the Last Chapter of the Gospel, 1874
- The Cosmic God, 1876
- History of the Hebrews' Second Commonwealth, 1880
- Judaism and Christianity, Their Agreements and Disagreements, 1883
- A Defense of Judaism vs. Proselytizing Christianity, 1889
- Pronaos to Holy Writ, 1891

In his early years he wrote novels, which appeared first as serials in The Israelite and later in book form:

- The Convert, 1854
- The Catastrophe of Eger
- The Shoemaker's Family
- Resignation and Fidelity, or Life and Romance
- Romance, Philosophy, and Cabalah, or the Conflagration in Frankfort-on-the-Main, 1855
- The Last Struggle of the Nation, 1856
- The Combat of the People, or Hillel and Herod, 1858
- The First of the Maccabees

He also wrote German novels, which appeared as serials in the Deborah; including:

- Die Juden von Landshuth
- Der Rothkopf, oder des Schulmeisters Tochter
- Baruch und Sein Ideal

Wise wrote in the editorial columns of The Israelite. He also wrote two plays, "Der Maskirte Liebhaber" and "Das Glück Reich zu Sein".

During his lifetime Wise was regarded as the most prominent Reform Jew of his time in the United States.

=== Links to some works of Wise ===
- Wise, Isaac Mayer (1889). A defense of Judaism versus proselytizing Christianity. American Israelite. "Isaac Mayer Wise."
- Wise, Isaac Mayer (1874). The martyrdom of Jesus of Nazareth: a historic-critical treatise on the last chapters of the Gospel. Office of the American Israelite. "Isaac Mayer Wise."
- Wise, Isaac Mayer (1872). Judaism: its doctrines and duties.
- Wise, Isaac Mayer (1868). The origin of Christianity: and a commentary to the Acts of the Apostles. Bloch. "Isaac Mayer Wise."
- Wise, Isaac Mayer (1891). Pronaos to Holy Writ: establishing on documentary evidence, the authorship, date, form, and contents of each of its books, and the authenticity of the Pentateuch. R. Clark. "Isaac Mayer Wise."
- Wise, Isaac Mayer (1854). History of the Israelitish nation: from Abraham to the present time, Volume 1.
- Wise, Isaac Mayer (1876). The cosmic God: A fundamental philosophy in popular lectures, Volume 3. Office American Israelite and Deborah. ISBN 9780598341211.

== Legacy and honors ==
- The SS Isaac Mayer Wise, a liberty ship in World War II, was named in his honor.
- A park in North College Hill, Ohio was dedicated to Wise. In 2022, the park was renovated and re-dedicated.
- The Isaac M. Wise Temple in Cincinnati, Ohio was named after him
