= The American Israelite =

Jewish weekly newspaper published in Cincinnati, Ohio

- August 5, 2010, front page
- Type: Weekly newspaper
- Format: Broadsheet
- Publisher: Netanel Deutsch
- Editor: Netanel Deutsch
- Founded: July 15, 1854
- Language: American English
- Headquarters: 11674 Lebanon Road; Cincinnati, Ohio
- Country: United States
- Circulation: 6,500 (as of 2016)
- OCLC number: 11975053
- Website: www.americanisraelite.com

The American Israelite is an English-language Jewish newspaper published weekly in Cincinnati, Ohio. Founded in 1854 as The Israelite and assuming its present name in 1874, it is the longest-running English-language Jewish newspaper still published in the United States and the second longest-running Jewish newspaper in the world, after the London-based Jewish Chronicle (founded in 1841).

The paper's founder, Rabbi Isaac Mayer Wise, and publisher, Edward Bloch and his Bloch Publishing Company, were influential figures in American Jewish life . During the 19th century, The American Israelite became the leading organ for Reform Judaism in America. During the early 20th century, it helped geographically dispersed American Jews, especially in the West and the South of the country, keep in touch with Jewish affairs and their religious identity. The paper has lasted into the 21st century, adding a website and a podcast as publishing technology has evolved.

== Founding and early history ==
The first Jewish newspaper published in Cincinnati was the English-language The Israelite, established on July 15, 1854. It was also among the first Jewish publications in the nation. It was founded by Rabbi Isaac Mayer Wise, who became known as the father of Reform Judaism in the United States. Its initial issues were published by Charles F. Schmidt. The paper lost $600 in its first year, and although Wise repaid the publisher out of his own funds, Schmidt terminated the relationship. Edward Bloch and his Bloch Publishing Company began to publish the paper with the issue of July 27, 1855. Bloch, who was Wise's brother-in-law, subsequently became a major figure among American Jewish publishers.

From the start, the newspaper's motto was יהי אור "Let There Be Light," and still is. Its two goals were to propagate the principles of Reform Judaism and to keep American Jews, who often lived in small towns singly or in communities of two or three families, in touch with Jewish affairs and their religious identity.

The publication, along with Die Deborah, a German-language supplement that Wise started the following year, soon attracted a large circulation and was influential in helping the nascent Reform movement spread throughout North America. Both Wise and the paper had a reach beyond Cincinnati, and especially to the growing Jewish communities in the American Midwest and South. In 1858, for instance, the members of Congregation B'nai Israel in Memphis, Tennessee advertised for their first rabbi in The Israelite, at the same time they advertised for a kosher butcher.

September 16, 1859, front page of The Israelite

Despite its spread, the early years of The Israelite were a financial struggle. Most subscribers did not pay their bills, the Panic of 1857 adversely affected it, and the paper lost half its subscribers in the South during the Civil War. Bloch travelled east several times in the late 1850s in order to solicit subscriptions and advertising. Wise's admitted sloppiness in monetary matters did not help either. Nevertheless, the newspaper and Bloch stayed out of bankruptcy and relocated to larger offices twice during this period.

Wise, a prolific writer, published in the editorial columns of The Israelite numerous studies on various subjects of Jewish interest. Besides being the leading organ for American Reform Judaism, it also forcefully defended the civil and religious rights of all Jews. Wise tirelessly expounded his call to the "ministers and other Israelites" of the United States, urging them to form a union which might put an end to the prevalent religious anarchy. In 1873, twenty-five years after he had first broached the idea, the Union of American Hebrew Congregations was organized at Cincinnati. Another campaign he presented in the columns of The Israelite was the desire for an educational institution, and this eventually led to success in 1875 when the Hebrew Union College opened its doors for the reception of students. Wise also wrote a number of novels, which appeared first as serials in the Israelite.

== New name and continued influence ==
The Israelite was renamed The American Israelite beginning with the issue of July 3, 1874. The goal was to make the name more in consonance with the ideas it represented. Despite the change, the paper continued to cover and advocate for not only American Jews but also Jews around the world. By 1879, a typical issue had eight pages 28 by 42 inches (71 by 107 cm) in size, and a subscription cost $4, or $5 if the Die Deborah four-page supplement was included.

Rabbi Wise's son Leo Wise, who had become business manager for the paper in 1875, took over as its publisher from 1883 to 1884, and then he did so again, permanently, in 1888 (due apparently to some kind of rupture between Leo Wise and Bloch). A sister publication, The Chicago Israelite, was started in 1885. The papers stressed their reputation in trade publications, stating "None but clean advertisements of reputable houses accepted."

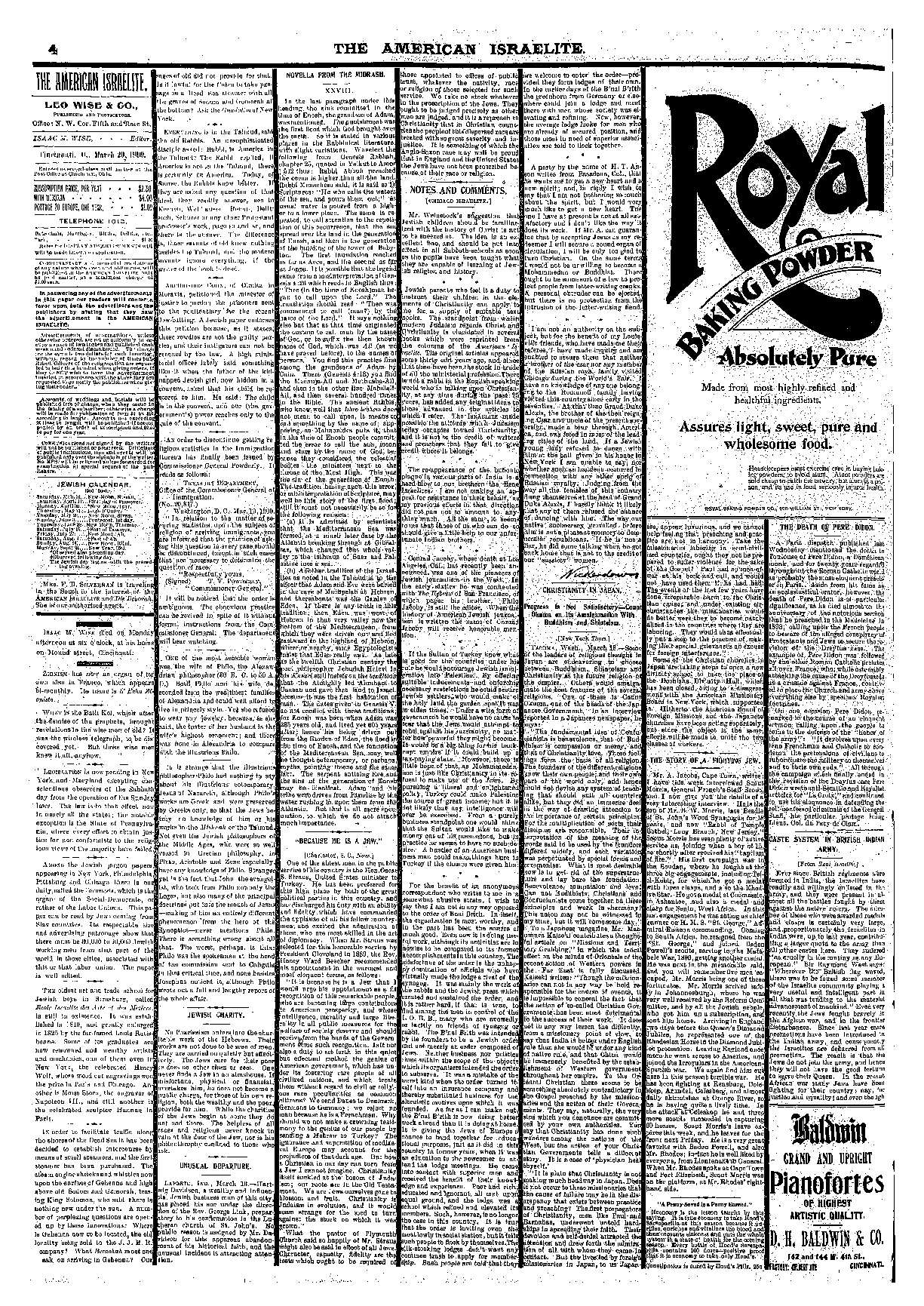
March 29, 1900, page of The American Israelite that announced the death of Isaac Mayer Wise

Leo Wise gradually took over the principle editorial functions from his father, but Rabbi Wise remained active on the paper until his death on March 26, 1900, writing an editorial for it just a few days before. Ownership then passed to Leo Wise.

By 1900, The American Israelite, in combination with The Chicago Israelite, claimed a circulation of other 35,000, about 12,000 in Ohio and Illinois and the balance spread across almost every other state as well as Canada and Mexico. The publication Printers' Ink said they had the largest guaranteed circulation of any Jewish newspaper in the U.S., and it continued to be especially strong in the West and the South. One 1902 book characterized The American Israelite as "the leading Jewish newspaper in the United States and the National Journal of the Jews."

In the early 20th century, the paper's short articles were sometimes picked up and run by The New York Times with a credit "From The American Israelite". In those years, The American Israelite became known for its very strong stance against the new Zionism movement, calling it in 1902 a "pernicious agitation" that would undermine the acceptance of Jews in the countries where they currently resided. Rabbi David Philipson was among the editorial contributors to the paper who used it to oppose Zionism, arguing that Judaism was a religion exclusively, and thus stateless. Other noted contributors to the paper in this era included Rabbi Moses Mielziner and Jewish history scholar Gotthard Deutsch, as well as other prominent rabbis and Jewish thinkers within the country. The paper gave extensive coverage to the goings-on of the Union of American Hebrew Congregations and the Hebrew Union College (and was sometimes viewed as a publication of them), as well as notices of various rabbinical conferences.

Die Deborah was discontinued after Isaac Wise's death, then resumed for a while. The Chicago Israelite ceased publication in 1920. Leo Wise edited The American Israelite until his retirement at age 78 in 1928 (he died in 1933). Another son of Isaac, Isidor Wise, worked as a writer and associate editor for the paper until his death in 1929.

== Subsequent history ==
Leo Wise was succeeded as editor and publisher of The American Israelite in 1928 by his half-brother, Rabbi Jonah Wise of New York, who remained in that city and who himself became a long-time leader of American Reform Judaism.

The Jonah Wise arrangement did not last long, and in 1930, journalist Henry C. Segal bought the paper and became its editor and publisher for more than five decades, until his death in 1985. Along with Isaac Wise, Segal is still named on the paper's masthead.

Contributors to the newspaper in the late 1980s and early 1990s included writer Don Canaan. His four-part series published in 1988, "Jews in Ohio's Prisons: Does Anyone Care?", won the award for best weekly journalism from the Ohio State Bar Association.

By the 1990s, the paper was focusing on local Jewish news. In 1995, The American Israelite was sued for $2 million by an Ohio lawyer for calling him and his son anti-Semitic.

By 1998, Ted Deutsch was the editor and publisher. A typical issue ran 24 pages, with color front and back pages and black-and-white inside. Some stories were locally written, while many others were run from the Jewish Telegraphic Agency. It published full facsimile copies of its issues on its website.

Beginning in 2020, The American Israelite initiated a weekly podcast titled "Let There Be Light", hosted by Ted Deutsch and Julie Bernsen Brook, to further its goal of broadening its reach throughout Jewish Cincinnati and beyond.

== See also ==
- List of Jewish newspapers in the United States
- List of newspapers published in Ohio
