= Alexander Lyons =

American rabbi

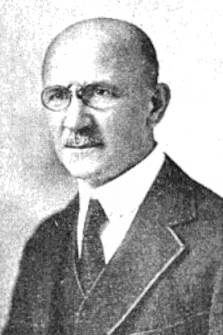
- Born: June 19, 1867; Mobile, Alabama, US
- Died: June 5, 1939 (aged 71); Brooklyn, New York, US
- Education: University of Cincinnati; Hebrew Union College
- Occupation: Rabbi
- Spouse: Ida Eisendrath (m. 1892)
- Children: 3

Alexander Lyons (June 19, 1867 – June 5, 1939) was an American rabbi who ministered in New York City for nearly 40 years.

== Life ==
Lyons was born on June 19, 1867, in Mobile, Alabama, the son of Samuel Lyons and Fanny Wolf.

Lyons attended public schools in Mobile. In 1891, he received a B.L. from the University of Cincinnati and was ordained a rabbi at Hebrew Union College. He served as rabbi of Temple Israel in Terre Haute, Indiana, from 1891 to 1895, followed by Congregation Beth Emeth in Albany, New York, from 1895 to 1902. In 1902, he became rabbi of Congregation Beth Elohim in Brooklyn, New York. He was a founder of the Consumptives Jewish Aid Society of Brooklyn in 1907. He wrote At Sinai, Home and School, Heart to Heart, and Delinquent Parents. He received an M.A. from Columbia University in 1906 and a Ph.D. from New York University in 1909.

Lyons served as rabbi of Beth Elohim until he died. Interested in promoting good will between Jews and Christians, he founded and edited the monthly magazine The Supplement in 1920 to promote interfaith understandings. He published a collection of his essays on the topic in the 1937 volume Jew and Christian. Active in general and Jewish social work, he was an executive board member of the Society for the Prevention of Crime, a member of the Brooklyn Library Board, and an honorary member of the Young Men's Christian Association. In 1919, the French government named him a Chevalier of the Legion of Honour for his service on the pulpit and platform on behalf of France and the Allies even before America joined World War I.

Lyons was a founder of the Sheepskin Club of Brooklyn and a member of B'nai B'rith, the Freemasons, the Judaeans, the Clergy Club, the Unity Club, and the Montauk Club. He was also an honorary member of the Knights of Columbus. In 1892, he married Ida Eisendrath. Their children were Samuel, Albert, and Irene.

Lyons died at home from a heart attack while recovering from pneumonia on June 5, 1939. He was cremated at Fresh Pond Crematory. His funeral at Beth Elohim was conducted by Rabbi Isaac Landman, his successor as rabbi of Beth Elohim, and Rabbi Sidney S. Tedesche of Union Temple. New York Supreme Court Justice Meier Steinbrink delivered the eulogy. The funeral was attended by 800 people, including Rabbi Samuel J. Levinson of Temple Beth Emeth, Rabbi Max Reichler of Temple Beth Sholom, Rabbi Harry Weiss of Shaari Zedek Temple, Association of Reform Rabbis of New York president Rabbi Joshua L. Goldberg, Rabbi Benjamin A. Tintner of the Association of Reform Rabbis, rabbis Joseph Miller, Jacob Bosniak, and A. Allen Steinbach of the Brooklyn Jewish Ministers Association, Rabbi Solomon Foster of Newark, and scores of jurists, public officials, and business leaders.
