= Congregation Beth Elohim =

Reform synagogue in Brooklyn, New York

- Hebrew: בֵּית אֱלֹהִים
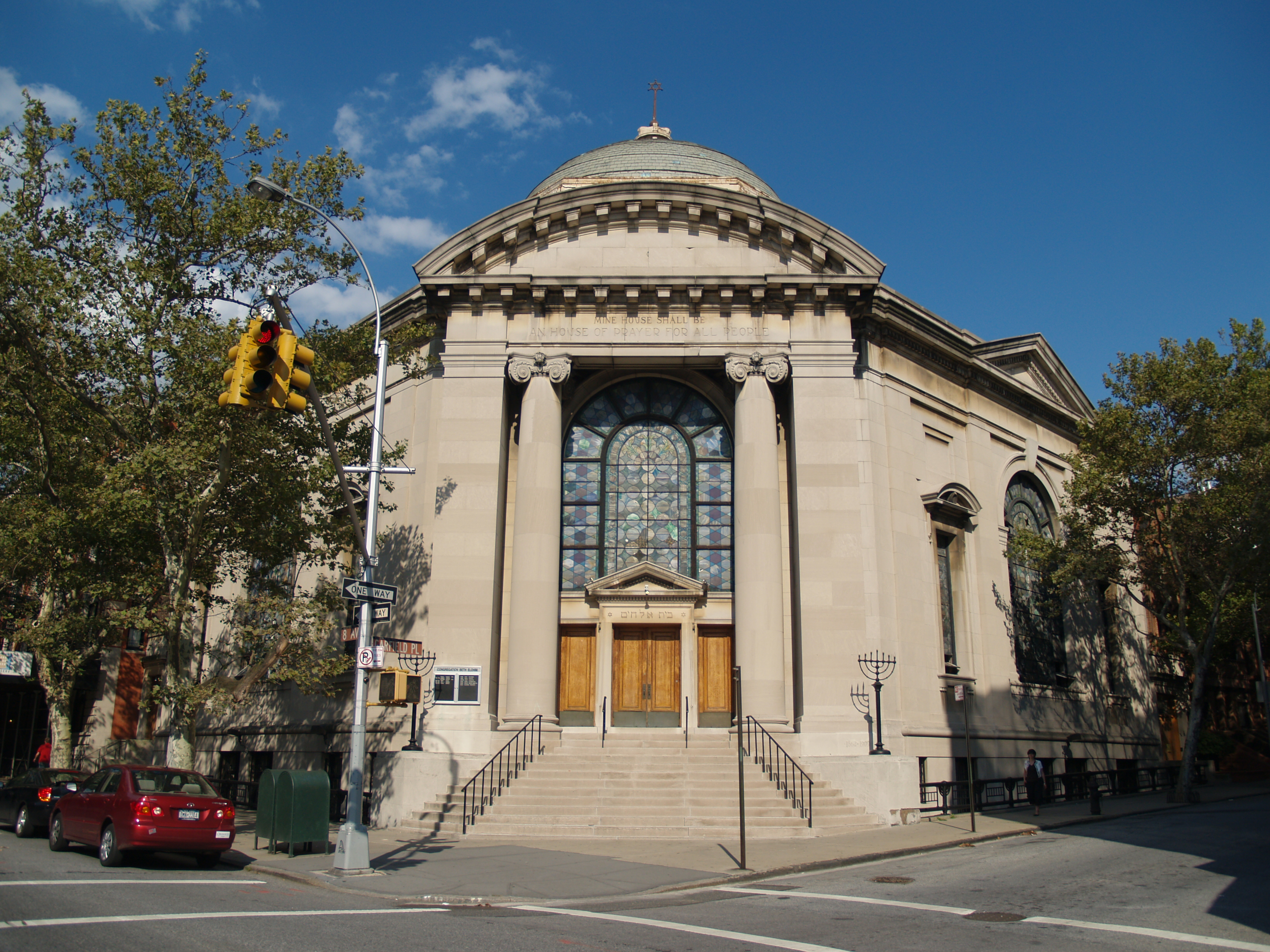
- Sanctuary main entrance

- Location in New York City

Religion
- Affiliation: Reform Judaism
- Ecclesiastical or organisational status: Synagogue
- Leadership: Rabbi Rachel Timoner; Rabbi Matthew Green (Associate); Rabbi Stephanie Kolin; Rabbi Gerald I. Weider (Emeritus)
- Status: Active

Location
- Location: 274 Garfield Place and Eighth Avenue, Park Slope, Brooklyn, New York City, New York
- Country: United States
- Coordinates: 40°40′16″N 73°58′27″W

Architecture
- Architects: Simon Eisendrath & B. Horowitz (Sanctuary); Mortimer Freehof & David Levy (Temple House)
- Type: Synagogue
- Style: Classical Revival (Sanctuary); Romanesque Revival (Temple House); Art Deco (Temple House)
- Established: 1861 (as a congregation)
- Groundbreaking: 1909 (Sanctuary); 1928 (Temple House)
- Completed: 1910 (Sanctuary); 1929 (Temple House)

Specifications
- Direction of façade: West (Sanctuary)
- Capacity: 1,200 worshippers
- Dome: One
- Materials: Cast stone

Website
- cbebk.org
- Temple Beth Elohim; and The Temple House
- U.S. Historic district – Contributing property
- New York City Landmark
- Part of: Park Slope Historic District (ID80002636)

Significant dates
- Designated CP: November 21, 1980
- Designated NYCL: July 17, 1973

Congregation Beth Elohim (Hebrew: בֵּית אֱלֹהִים, lit. 'House of God'), also known as the Garfield Temple and the Eighth Avenue Temple, is a Reform Jewish congregation and historic synagogue located at 274 Garfield Place and Eighth Avenue, in the Park Slope neighborhood of Brooklyn in New York City, New York, United States.

Founded in 1861 as a more liberal breakaway from Congregation Baith Israel, for the first 65 years it attempted four mergers with other congregations, including three with Baith Israel, all of which failed. The congregation completed its current Classical Revival synagogue building in 1910 and its "Jewish Deco" (Romanesque Revival and Art Deco) Temple House in 1929. These two buildings were contributing properties to the Park Slope historic district, listed as a New York City Landmark district and listed on the National Register of Historic Places.

The congregation went through difficult times during the Great Depression, and the bank almost foreclosed on its buildings in 1946. Membership dropped significantly in the 1930s because of the Depression, grew after World War II, and dropped again in the 1960s and 1970s as a result of demographic shifts. Programs for young children helped draw Jewish families back into the neighborhood and revitalize the membership.

By 2006, Beth Elohim had over 1,000 members, and, as of 2009, it was the largest and most active Reform congregation in Brooklyn, the "oldest Brooklyn congregation that continues to function under its corporate name", and its pulpit was the oldest in continuous use in any Brooklyn synagogue. In 2009, it was listed by Newsweek as one of America's 25 "Most Vibrant" Jewish congregations.

== Early years: Pearl Street ==
Congregation Beth Elohim was founded on September 29, 1861, by 41 German and Bohemian Jews at Granada Hall on Myrtle Avenue, members of Congregation Baith Israel who had become disaffected after they attempted and failed to reform practice there. The synagogue name was chosen by a vote of the membership, and the services were led by George Brandenstein, who served as cantor, and was paid $150 (today $5,400) a year. Brandenstein was hired as cantor, not rabbi, because "the congregation believed having a cantor was more important", though in practice he filled both roles. A shamash (the equivalent of a sexton or beadle) was also hired for $75 a year.

While searching for a permanent location, the congregation continued to meet and hold services at Granada Hall. Men and women sat together, unlike the traditional separate seating, and services were conducted in German and Hebrew. Within a few months, the former Calvary Protestant Episcopal church on Pearl Street, between Nasau and Concord, was purchased for $5,100 (today $164,000) and renovated for another $2,000 (today $65,000). The new building was dedicated on March 30, 1862, and the congregation became known as "the Pearl street synagogue". By 1868, membership had increased to 103, and by 1869, almost 100 students attended the Sunday school.

Beth Elohim had originally conducted its services in the traditional manner, but on February 19, 1870 "inaugurated the moderate reform services" instead. In an attempt to stem defections and make the synagogue more attractive to existing and potential members, that same month the congregation purchased, for $55,000 (today $1,400,000), the building of the Central Presbyterian Church on Schermerhorn Street near Nevins Street. Sufficient numbers of new members did not, however, materialize, and the congregation was forced to give up its new building, forfeit its $4,000 (today $102,000) deposit, and return to the Pearl Street building. Instead, the Pearl street building was renovated, and an organ and choir added. Ignaz Grossmann served as rabbi from 1873 to 1876.

Beth Elohim voted to retire Brandenstein in 1882, an action which created some controversy both within the congregation, and among other Brooklyn synagogues. Younger members of the congregation found no specific fault with Brandenstein, but wanted "a change", and succeeded in dismissing him and electing an entirely new board of officers. The final vote was 29 in favor, 21 against, out of a total membership of 53 or 54 (only the male heads of households were counted as members during this era). Solomon Mosche was hired to replace Brandenstein.

In April 1883, Baith Israel, Beth Elohim, and Temple Israel, Brooklyn's three leading synagogues, attempted an amalgamation. This was the third such attempt; the previous two had failed when the members could not agree on synagogue ritual. The combined congregation, which would purchase new premises, would have 150 members; members would be refunded half the purchase price of the pews in their existing buildings. Mosche and the rabbi of Temple Israel were to split the offices of rabbi and cantor: Baith Israel, at the time, had no rabbi. Though this attempt also failed, in the following year the three congregations carried out combined activities, including a picnic and a celebration of the 100th birthday of Moses Montefiore. Membership at that time still hovered around 50.

Mosche fell ill in 1884, and after being unable to serve for six months, was replaced by 26-year-old William Sparger. Despite his illness, Mosche lived until age 75, dying on November 3, 1911.

Sparger was Hungarian by birth, a graduate of the Prince Rudolph University of Vienna, and, according to a contemporary New York Times article, "belong[ed] to the extreme liberal school of Hebrew theology". He introduced changes to the services, including improving the choir, bringing in a new prayer book, adding Friday night services, and the "radical reform" of making the sermon the most important part of the service. He appealed to younger congregants, and, under his direction, the synagogue experienced a large increase in attendance.

== State Street ==
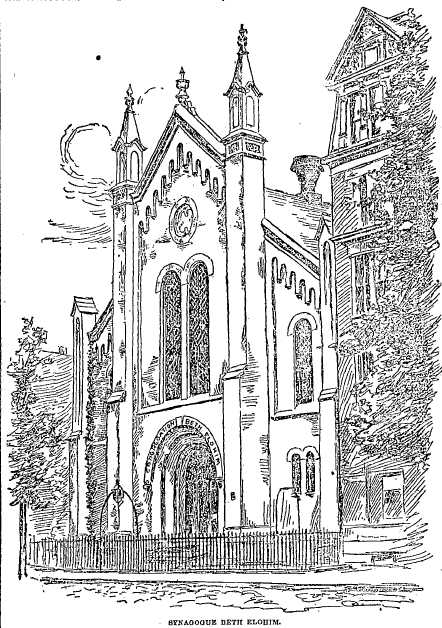
State Street building in 1891

Though more seats had been added to the synagogue by narrowing the aisles, as a result of Sparger's innovations Beth Elohim outgrew its Pearl Street building, and a new one was sought. After a three-year search, in 1885 Beth Elohim purchased the building of the Congregational Church at 305 State Street (near Hoyt) for $28,000 (today $1,000,000), and moved in that year.

In 1891, Temple Emanu-El in Manhattan offered Sparger a salary larger than Beth Elohim could match, and he moved there. Beth Elohim subsequently split the offices of cantor and rabbi, hiring G. Taubenhaus as rabbi and the Mauritz Weisskopf as cantor.

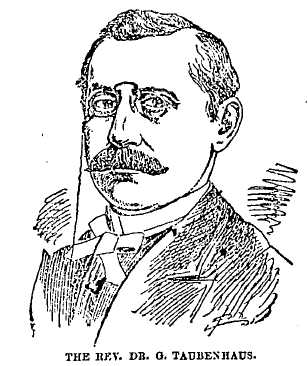
G. Taubenhaus when he was hired as rabbi in 1891

Born in Warsaw, Taubenhaus could read the Pentateuch fluently in Hebrew at age four, and began studying the Talmud at age six. He attended the "Berlin theological seminary" (likely the Hochschule für die Wissenschaft des Judentums) for six years. Upon emigrating to the United States, he served at Kehillah Kodesh Bene Yeshurum in Paducah, Kentucky, Temple Israel in Dayton, Ohio, and Congregation B'nai Israel in Sacramento, California, before becoming the rabbi of the Shaari Zedek ("Gates of Hope") synagogue in New York. Differences with the latter congregation led to his resignation there shortly before being hired by Beth Elohim. Taubenhaus's brother Joseph would be appointed rabbi at Baith Israel, Beth Elohim's parent congregation, in 1893, and another brother, Jacob/Jean Taubenhaus, was a famous French chess master.

By the time of Taubenhaus's hiring, Beth Elohim was, according to the Brooklyn Eagle, "recognized as the leading Hebrew synagogue of Brooklyn". The views of the congregation regarding kashrut (the Jewish dietary laws) were by then quite liberal; in 1892, when Hyman Rosenberg was expelled as rabbi of Brooklyn's Beth Jacob synagogue for eating ham, Taubenhaus stated that he did not believe his congregation would expel him for doing the same.

In 1895, Samuel Radnitz succeeded Weisskopf as cantor, a role he filled until his death in 1944.

By the turn of the twentieth century English had replaced German in the services and official minutes, and the second days of holidays eliminated. The synagogue had 106 members and annual revenues of around $8,000 (today $310,000), and its Sunday School had approximately 300 pupils.

Taubenhaus left the congregation in 1901, and the following year Alexander Lyons was hired as the congregation's first American-born rabbi. Lyons went on to serve the congregation for 37 years, until his death in 1939 at the age of 71.

In 1907, the women's auxiliary was founded; until then, though seating was mixed, women had little say in the running of the synagogue. That year the congregation had 110 member families and annual revenues of $9,259.55 (today $320,000). The congregational school, which held classes one day a week, had 15 teachers and 200 students.

== Garfield Place and Eighth Avenue ==
=== 1908–1929: New buildings ===
In 1908, the congregation purchased a 100-foot (30 m) by 112-foot (34 m) lot on the northeast corner of Garfield Place and Eighth Avenue. Plans were made to erect a new synagogue building there with a sanctuary seating 1,500 people, at an anticipated cost of $100,000 (today $3.6 million). The structure was designed and built by the Manhattan architectural firm of Simon Eisendrath and B. Horowitz (or Horwitz). Construction began in 1909 and completed in 1910. Designed in the Classical Revival style, this "monumental example" of "austere neo-Classical grandeur" had five sides, representing the five books of Moses, a sanctuary that ultimately sat 1,200, and was capped by a saucer dome. The entrance faced the corner of Garfield and Eighth, and carved in stone over it was the Biblical verse fragment "MINE HOUSE SHALL BE AN HOUSE OF PRAYER FOR ALL PEOPLE" (Isaiah 56:7). The basement held classrooms, an auditorium, and administrative offices, and behind the Torah ark was a combination Rabbi's study/Board meeting room. The State Street building was sold to Congregation Mount Sinai.

1909 was also the year Judah Leon Magnes proposed and founded his Kehilla, a "comprehensive communal organization for the Jews of New York", which operated until 1922. Lyons opposed its creation, arguing that Jews in New York were too diverse to co-exist in one organization with a single set of standards, that Jews should not organize as Jews for anything except purely religious purposes, and that in any event Reform Judaism was the future and Orthodox Judaism would not survive. As Lyons put it,

To me Reform Judaism is an irresistible conviction. I believe it to be the religion of the Jewish future, while I regard orthodoxy as a survival that may have a galvanized life now and then, but on the whole is doomed.

By 1919, Beth Elohim had 133 member families. The congregational school, which held classes once a week, had 305 students and 16 teachers.

Negotiations to merge with Union Temple (the successor to Temple Israel) were started in 1925. A confirmation vote eventually passed, and the impending merger was announced in the Brooklyn Eagle. However, younger congregants feared a loss of identity, and forced a withdrawal.

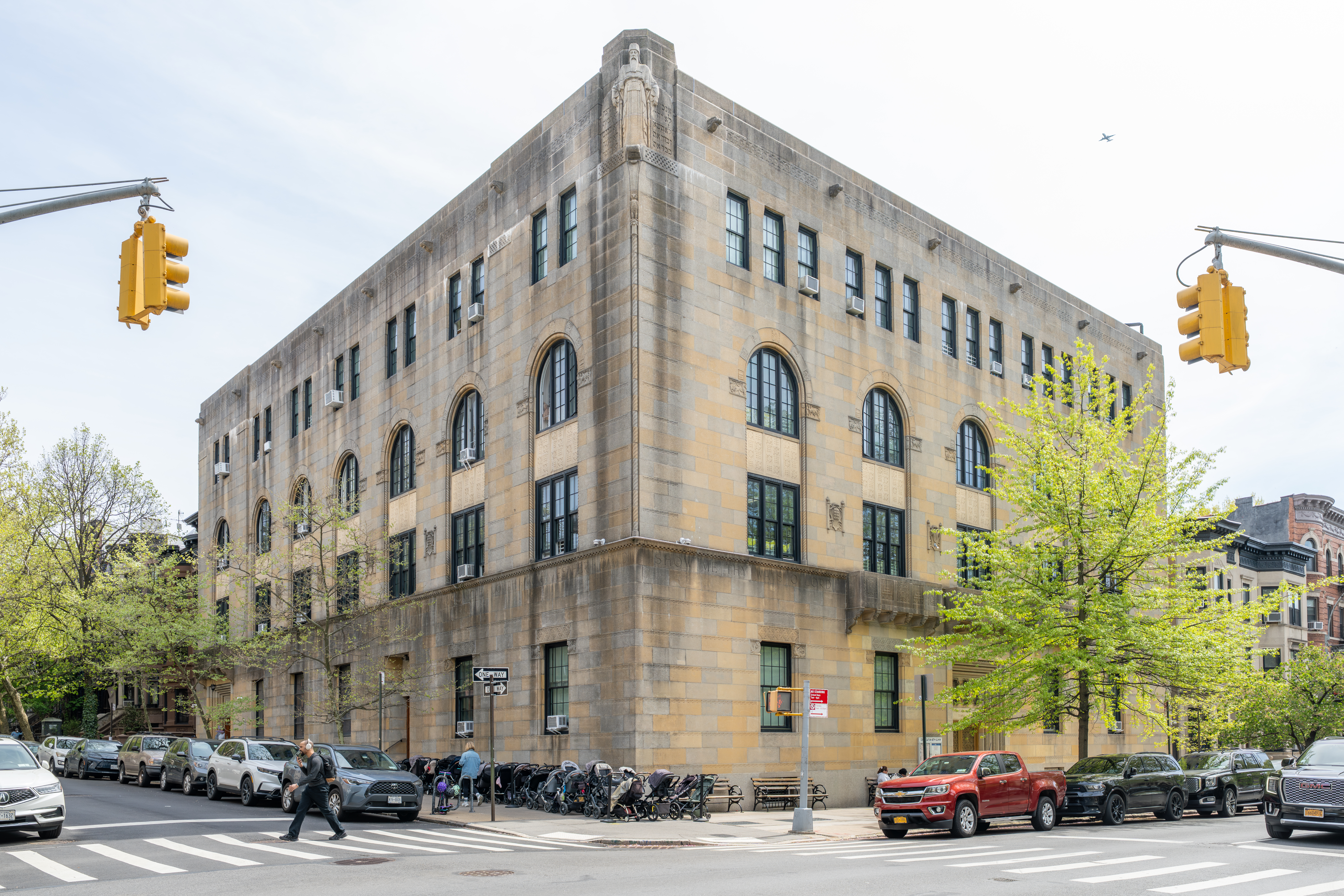
Temple House

Instead, the congregation raised funds for a second building, and in 1928–1929 built the six-story Temple House (used for all congregational activities) on the corner opposite the main sanctuary. Designed by Mortimer Freehof and David Levy, the cast stone building's architectural style was "Jewish Deco", a mix of Romanesque Revival and Art Deco decorative forms that was common in Jewish buildings of the period. Romanesque features included the fenestrations, while a prominent Art Deco feature was "the figure of Moses and the Tablets of Law, emphasizing the corner of the roof parapet." The doorway and balcony at the east end of the building had "a distinctly Moorish flavor, featuring symbolic ornament: the Star of David, the Menorah, and the Lion of Judah." The names of major figures from the Tanakh (Hebrew Bible) were inscribed on the Garfield Place facade, and the Biblical verses "SHOW ME THY WAYS O LORD TEACH ME THY PATHS GUIDE ME" (Psalms 25:4–5) on the Eighth Avenue facade. The building was also decorated with bas-reliefs of Jonah being swallowed by a great fish and Babylonian charioteers. It housed a 125-seat chapel, a large ballroom, social halls, class rooms for the religious school, meeting rooms, administrative offices, a library, handball courts, a gymnasium, and a swimming pool.

Lyons took on a number of causes in the 1910s and 1920s. He worked with Bishop David Greer and Rabbi Stephen Wise to expose conditions in New York's tenements, dissociated himself from Tammany Hall candidates, tried to secure a re-trial for Leo Frank, and opposed some of the views of Samuel Gompers. In 1912, Lyons was a founding member of the Eastern Council of Reform Rabbis, an organization of Reform rabbis from the Eastern United States that was created despite opposition from the Central Conference of Reform Rabbis. In 1919 he withdrew from the Brooklyn Victory Celebration Committee (celebrating the Allied victory in World War I) and asked that his contributed funds be donated instead to the Red Cross; many committee members eventually resigned in protest over the overt politicization of the event, and its control by William Randolph Hearst.

=== 1930s: Landman joins, Great Depression, Lyons dies ===
Isaac Landman, a graduate of Hebrew Union College, joined Lyons as rabbi of Beth Elohim in 1931. Born in Russia in 1880, Landman had come to the United States in 1890. In 1911, with the assistance of Jacob Schiff, Julius Rosenwald, and Simon Bamberger, he founded a Jewish farm colony in Utah, and during World War I he was "said to be the first Jewish chaplain in the United States Army to serve on foreign soil". A leader in Jewish–Christian ecumenism, he was editor of American Hebrew Magazine from 1918, served as the delegate of the Union of American Hebrew Congregations (now Union for Reform Judaism) to the 1919 Paris Peace Conference, and in the late 1930s and early 1940s was editor of the new ten volume Universal Jewish Encyclopedia.

Landman had also been a prominent opponent of Zionism: when, in 1922, the United States Congress was considering the Lodge–Fish resolution in support of the Balfour Declaration, Landman and Rabbi David Philipson had presented the Reform movement's (then) anti-Zionist position to the House Committee on Foreign Affairs. Landman also printed many opinions against the resolution and Zionism in his American Hebrew Magazine. The bill was eventually unanimously supported by both houses of Congress, and approved by President Harding.

During the Great Depression synagogue membership decreased significantly; experiencing financial difficulties, the congregation stopped paying its mortgage. Nevertheless, Beth Elohim was not completely moribund; in 1931 it opened its Academy of Adult Jewish Education, which "offered courses in Bible, religion and contemporary Jewish life", and operated throughout the Depression. By 1937 the congregation had elected Lyons "rabbi for life".

In 1938 Lyons made common cause with Thomas Harten, the black pastor of Holy Trinity Baptist Church. Speaking to a mixed black–Jewish audience at the church, Lyons informed the listeners that he was planning to attend the second Joe Louis vs. Max Schmeling boxing match in order to protest Adolf Hitler's "view that a bout between a German and a Negro was improper". Lyons denounced the Nazi racial ideas, which he noted discriminated against blacks as well as Jews, and encouraged the audience to boycott all German-made goods until "Hitler comes to his senses".

Lyons died the following year, and Landman served as sole rabbi. After his death, the Central Conference of American Rabbis described Lyons as the "dean of the Brooklyn rabbinate from the point of view of service".

=== World War II and aftermath: Sack joins, Landman dies ===
The synagogue's fortunes improved in the 1940s, but in 1946, its bank threatened to foreclose on its buildings, in anticipation of their sale to the local Catholic diocese, as the congregation had not paid the mortgage in many years. The congregation succeeded in convincing the bank to re-negotiate its mortgage, and reduce the outstanding loan, and Max Koeppel led a drive to pay it off completely.

Eugene Sack, the father of Second Circuit Court of Appeals judge Robert D. Sack, joined Landman as rabbi in 1946. While serving as assistant rabbi of Congregation Rodeph Shalom of Philadelphia, Sack had been instrumental in the founding of the Reform movement's National Federation of Temple Youth in 1939, and had presented a paper at its first biennial convention. Starting in 1943 he spent 18 months in the Pacific Theater of Operations of World War II as an army chaplain; at one point he had to substitute peach juice for Passover wine.

Sack had also previously been involved in anti-Zionist efforts amongst the Reform rabbinate. In 1942 the Central Conference of American Rabbis had abandoned its former anti-Zionist stance, and adopted a resolution favoring the creation of a Jewish army in Palestine, to fight alongside other Allied armies, and under Allied command. Sack and other prominent Reform rabbis opposed this; meeting on March 18, 1942, they agreed "there was a need to revitalize Reform Judaism, to oppose Jewish nationalism, and to publicize their point of view". They planned "for a meeting of non-Zionist Reform Rabbis to discuss the problems that confront Judaism and Jews in the world emergency", to be held in Atlantic City. 36 rabbis eventually attended the two-day conference on June 1, 1942, including Beth Israel's Landman. The conference led to the formation of the anti-Zionist American Council for Judaism, "the only American Jewish organization ever formed for the specific purpose of fighting Zionism and opposing the establishment of a Jewish state in Palestine."

Landman died suddenly in 1946, leaving Sack to head Beth Elohim alone; Sack would eventually serve as rabbi for 35 years. Richard Harvey also joined as cantor in the 1940s; he would serve until his death in the 1970s.

After the war, Beth Elohim allowed women to become full members, granting them full voting privileges and allowing them to hold office. The congregation subsequently elected Jeanette Marks as a trustee. At this time the origins of the membership began to change, as Jews of Eastern European descent started joining the congregation.

In the late 1940s the central vault ceiling of the main sanctuary cracked, and had to be repaired. At that time the pulpit was also rebuilt, so that the rabbi and cantor had separate pulpits. Underneath the sanctuary ran an underground stream which would regularly overflow, leading to flooding problems. The flooding was fixed in the 1950s with the installation of check valves, and a concrete slab floor was installed. Though the intent was to provide usable space in the basement, it was rarely used.

By 1953, Beth Elohim had grown to over 700 families, and the religious school had over 550 students. In the 1960s, however, membership began to decline, as young families moved to the suburbs.

=== 1970s–2000s: Decline, Weider joins, re-birth ===
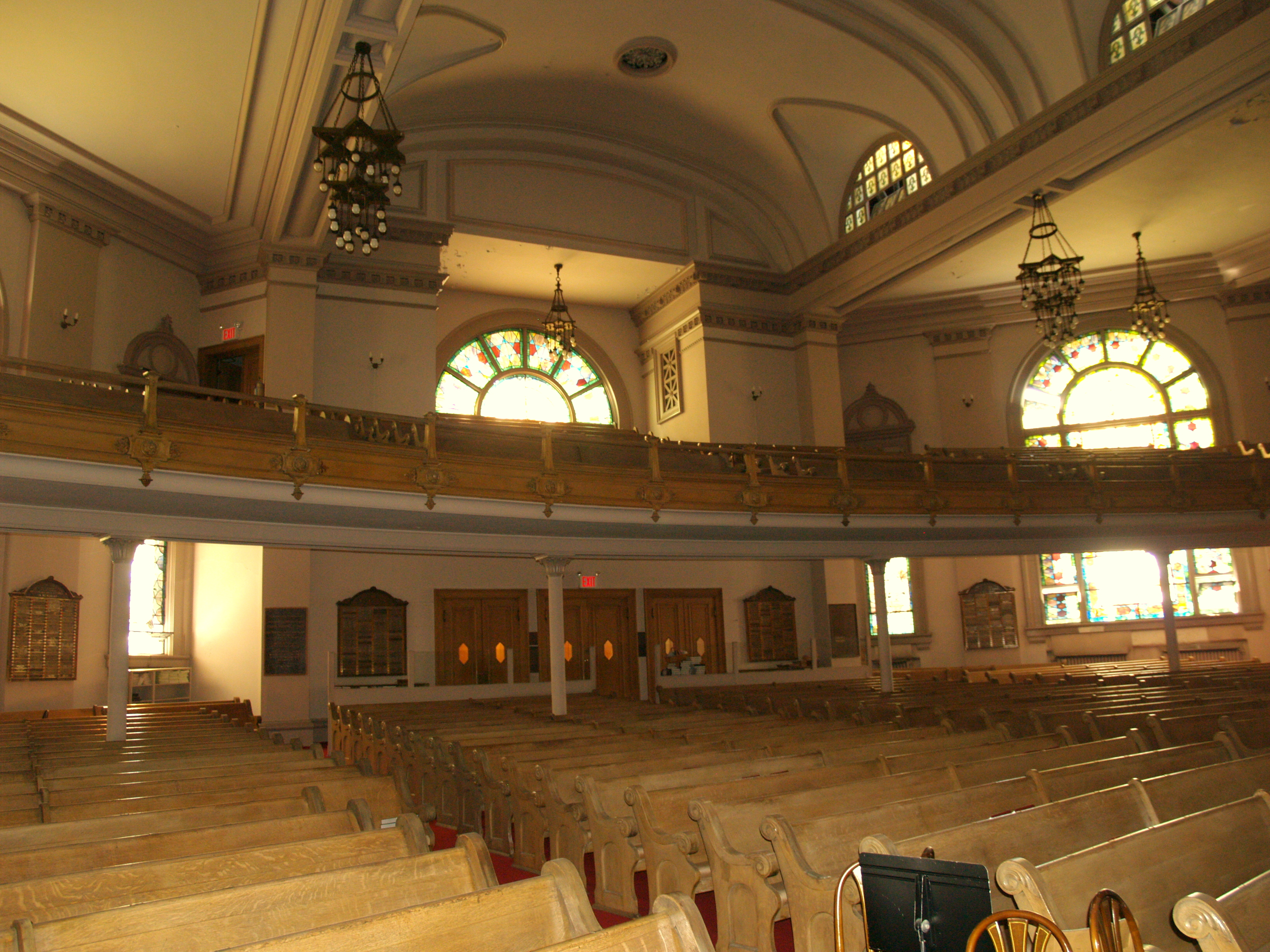
Sanctuary interior

In 1970, the congregation again encountered difficulties, "faced with dwindling membership and bleak prospects". The members, however, created one of the earliest nursery schools in the neighborhood, which, along with the Brownstone Revival movement in Park Slope, helped draw Jewish families back into the temple and revitalize the membership. One of those young families was that of Gerald I. Weider, a young rabbi who joined the synagogue's staff in 1978.

A native of the Bronx, Weider graduated from Rutgers University, and was ordained at Hebrew Union College in Cincinnati in 1973 (he would be granted a Doctor of Divinity degree by Hebrew Union College in 1998). Before joining Beth Elohim, he served as Assistant Rabbi of Temple Ohabei Shalom of Brookline, Massachusetts, and as the Associate Rabbi of Washington Hebrew Congregation in Washington, D.C. At Beth Elohim, he focused on programming and services for urban Jewish families. Under his leadership, Beth Elohim opened after–school and early childhood centers in 1978, and a day camp the following year, all housed in the Temple House.

The 1970s also saw a return to more traditional practices in the service, under Weider's guidance. Some members began wearing head coverings in the sanctuary, some Hebrew prayers were added to the Sabbath service, and the Reform movement's new High Holy Days prayer book The Gates of Repentance was adopted. The synagogue building and Temple House were contributing properties to the Park Slope historic district, which was listed as a New York City Landmark district in 1973, and added to the National Register of Historic Places in 1980.

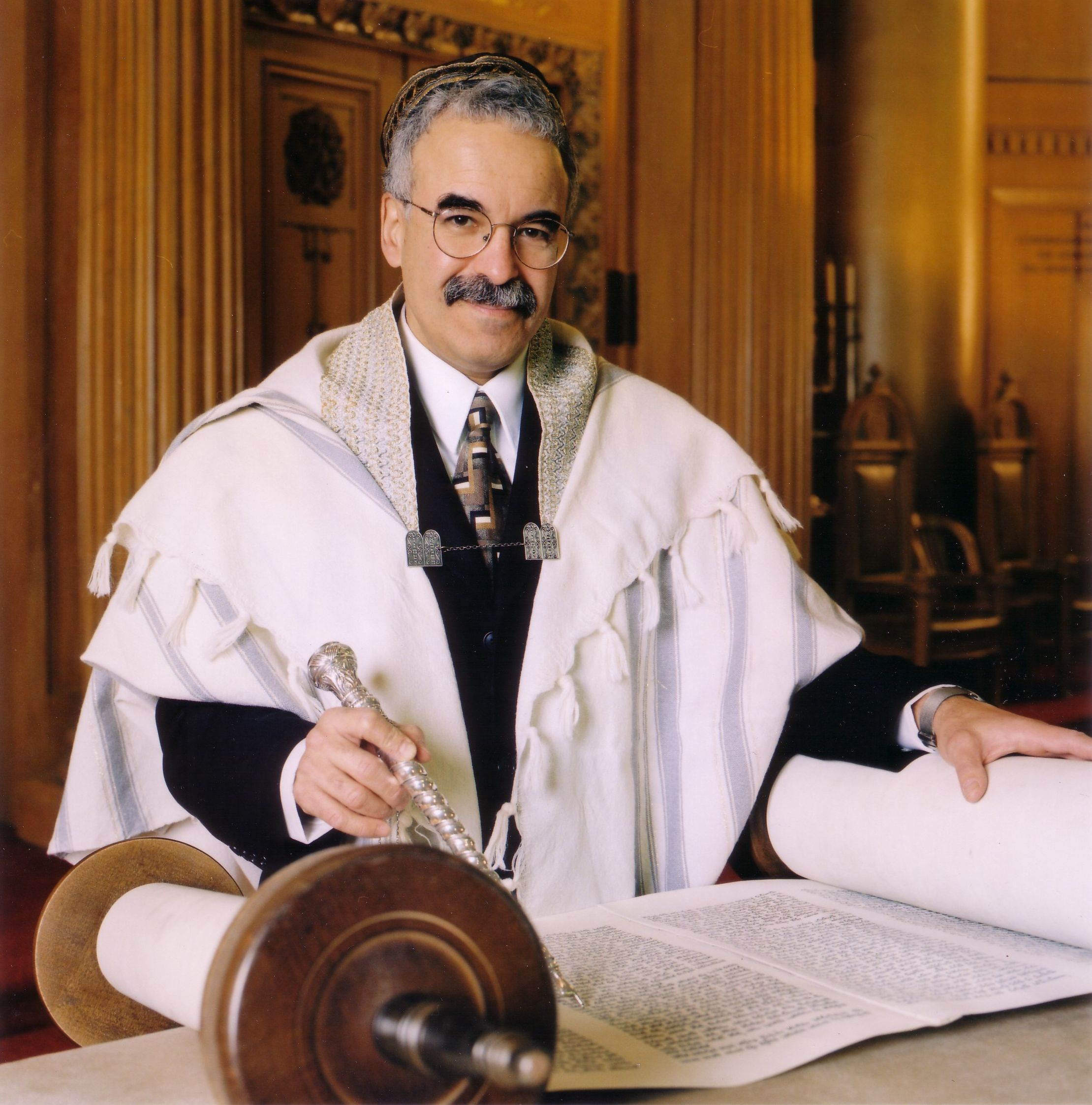
Gerald Weider at his 25th anniversary as senior rabbi

In 1985, Weider and Beth Elohim, in cooperation with the rabbis of the Park Slope Jewish Center and Congregation Baith Israel Anshei Emes, proposed opening a liberal Jewish day school in Brooklyn. Though housed at Beth Elohim, it would not be affiliated with any specific Jewish movement, and was intended for children from all branches of Judaism. Planning began in earnest in 1994; the school was modeled on New York's Abraham Joshua Heschel School, as an outgrowth of Beth Elohim's preschool program. The intent was to start with only first grade in 1995, but extend to eighth grade by 2000. At the time Beth Elohim had approximately 500 member families and 141 children in the preschool. The school opened in 1995, and continued for three years, growing to 38 students, before moving to new premises and becoming independent under the name "Hannah Senesh Community Day School".

In the 1980s and 1990s Beth Elohim's buildings were repaired and refurbished a number of times. The sanctuary ceiling cracked in the early 1980s, and services were held in Temple House for a time. The congregation mounted a "Save our Sanctuary" campaign in 1982, and repaired the ceiling. In the 1980s Beth Elohim also refurbished the Moses stained glass window, and painted the main sanctuary. The congregation restored and renovated its buildings in 1990, and in 1992 did emergency restoration work to the facade of Temple House and restored the pews. In 1997 the synagogue began its "Kadimah Capital Campaign", which was intended to raise funds to repair and renovate the buildings. By 1999, the congregation had restored Temple House's facade, rebuilt the collapsed Garfield St. entrance, made entry into the synagogue handicapped accessible, added a multipurpose space and classrooms in the basement of the sanctuary, and planned to add a fifth floor for more classrooms. That year Sack (by then Rabbi Emeritus) died; the year before his death his son, Robert, at his induction as a Second Circuit judge, had described his father as "the most open minded man he had ever known".

Janet Leuchter joined as cantor in 2001. A native of Vineland, New Jersey, and 1999 graduate of Hebrew Union College, she had previously served as cantor of Temple Avodah in Oceanside, New York.

=== Weider retires, events since 2006 ===
Weider retired as senior rabbi in 2006, after 28 years of service. He was succeeded by Andy Bachman. At that time, Beth Elohim had over 500 members. In 2007, the synagogue was a winner of the Union for Reform Judaism's Congregation of Learners award for medium size synagogues, for "those synagogues that provide an exceptional environment of varied and comprehensive learning opportunities and have imbued their synagogue communities with a culture of learning".

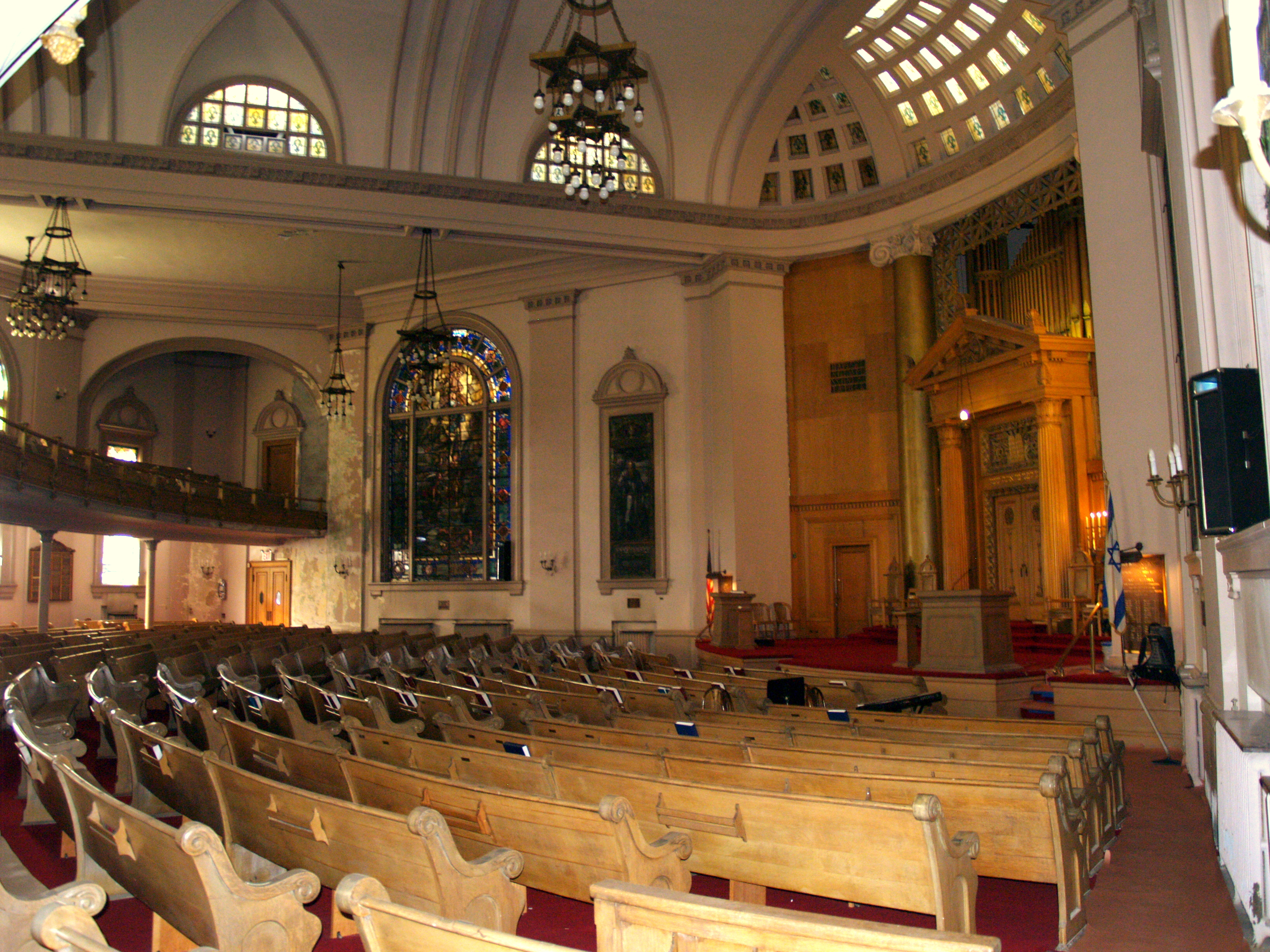
Sanctuary interior

In 2009, Beth Elohim was described as the largest and most active Reform congregation in Brooklyn. Prominent members included U.S. Senator Chuck Schumer. In April of that year, Beth Elohim was listed by Newsweek as one of America's 25 "Most Vibrant" Jewish congregations. In September, just four days before Yom Kippur, a part of the sanctuary ceiling collapsed. No-one was hurt, but the sanctuary had to be closed. The nearby Old First Reformed Church—with which Beth Elohim had had close ties since the 1930s—offered its premises for the holiday (Sunday night and Monday), and accommodated over 1000 worshipers. The day before the holiday, the synagogue was picketed by members of the Westboro Baptist Church, who shouted antisemitic and anti-gay slogans.

As of 2012, Beth Elohim was the "oldest Brooklyn congregation that continues to function under its corporate name", and its pulpit was the oldest in continuous use in any Brooklyn synagogue. Its rabbis were Andy Bachman, Shira Koch Epstein, and Marc Katz, the rabbi emeritus was Gerald Weider, and the cantor was Joshua Breitzer.

Bachman, a graduate of University of Wisconsin–Madison with a 1996 rabbinic ordination from Hebrew Union College, became Beth Elohim's first new senior rabbi in 25 years on October 25, 2006. Before becoming senior rabbi he had previously been an educator there from 1993 to 1998. An advocate of more traditionalism in the Reform movement, in 2002 he started a small, more traditional, Hebrew-focused spinoff prayer group at Beth Elohim, and has spoken in favor of a more traditional liturgy. Bachman and his wife, Rachel Altstein, have been instrumental in bringing 20- and 30-year-olds into the synagogue, and in December 2007, Bachman was named one of The Forward's "Forward 50". In 2008 he was a regular contributor to the Washingtonpost.Newsweek Interactive website. Epstein, born in the Bronx and raised in New Milford, Connecticut, attended Wesleyan University and Hebrew Union College, and served as the coordinator of the Institute for Reform Zionism. In 2008 she was a member of "Rabbis for Obama", a cross-denominational group of more than 300 American rabbis supporting Barack Obama's 2008 presidential campaign. Barrington Rhode Island native Marc Katz graduated from Tufts University and studied at Hebrew Union College in Jerusalem before becoming Beth Elohim's rabbinic intern in 2009. He served as the congregation's Associate Rabbi until 2018 and is now the Rabbi at Temple Ner Tamid in Bloomfield, NJ.

On September 22, 2013, Beth Elohim celebrated its 150th anniversary and dedicated a new Sefer Torah. Members of Beth Elohim stated it was "the first Torah in New York City to be completed by a woman". In June 2015, Andy Bachman departed to join the 92nd Street Y as the Director of Jewish Content and Community Ritual, and in addition, he founded "Water Over Rocks," a non-profit dedicated to memory and civic responsibility. In July 2015, Rachel Timoner became the Senior Rabbi.

In April 2020, Congregation Beth Elohim began discussing the possibility to merge with Union Temple of Brooklyn for financial reasons. They merged on March 26, 2021.
