= George Skinner =

George Skinner may refer to:

- George Skinner (footballer) (1917–2002), English footballer and football manager
- George Herbert Skinner (1872–1931), British boot and shoe manufacturer, pioneer motorist, inventor, and Olympic sport shooting medalist
- George Irving Skinner (1858–1926), lawyer and superintendent of the New York State Banking Department
- George J. Skinner (1869–1935), American lawyer and member of the New York State Assembly
