= George Irving Skinner =

American lawyer

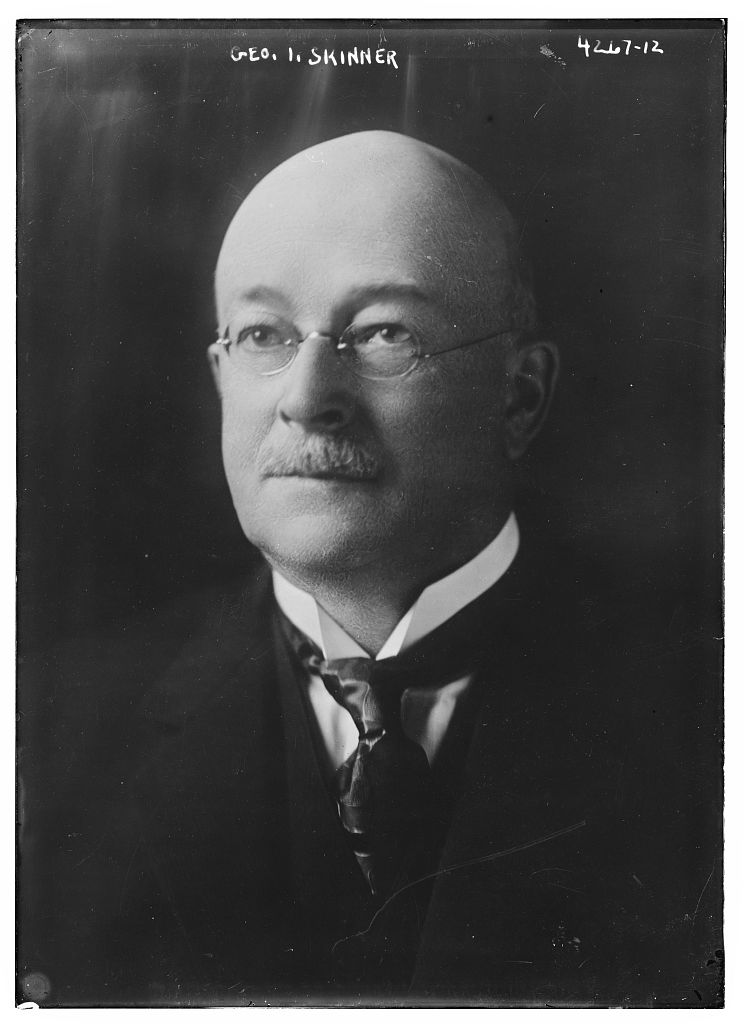
- George Skinner circa 1917
- Born: February 20, 1858; Bainbridge, New York
- Died: March 13, 1926 (aged 68); Brooklyn, New York City
- Occupations: Lawyer and Banker
- Known for: Superintendent of the New York State Banking Department 1917-1920
- Spouse: Elizabeth McCrae (m. 1890)

George Irving Skinner (February 20, 1858 - March 13, 1926) was an American lawyer who was appointed as the superintendent of the New York State Banking Department in 1917.

== Early life and education ==
He was born on February 20, 1858, in Bainbridge, New York. He graduated from Colgate University in 1880. After his graduation he taught at the Norwich Academy and was an assistant principal for two years. Later he was principal of the Smithville High School. He read law in the office of John W. J. Church of this city and was admitted to the bar in 1887.

== Career ==
He began his legal practice in Bainbridge, New York, and then he served one term as the postmaster of Bainbridge, appointed by the administration of Benjamin Harrison. He married Mary Elizabeth McCrae (1866-1951) around 1890.

He was made a state bank examiner in 1897. He was appointed as the superintendent of the New York State Banking Department in 1917 by Charles Seymour Whitman, and he was replaced by George Vincent McLaughlin in 1920. Nathan S. Jonas of the Manufacturers Trust Company appointed him as a vice president at the bank.

He died at his home in Brooklyn on March 13, 1926, of heart attack following a bout of influenza. He was buried in Saint Peters Churchyard in Bainbridge, New York.
