= Global School Brooklyn =

German international school in New York City, USA

Coordinates: 40.67344°N 73.96793°W

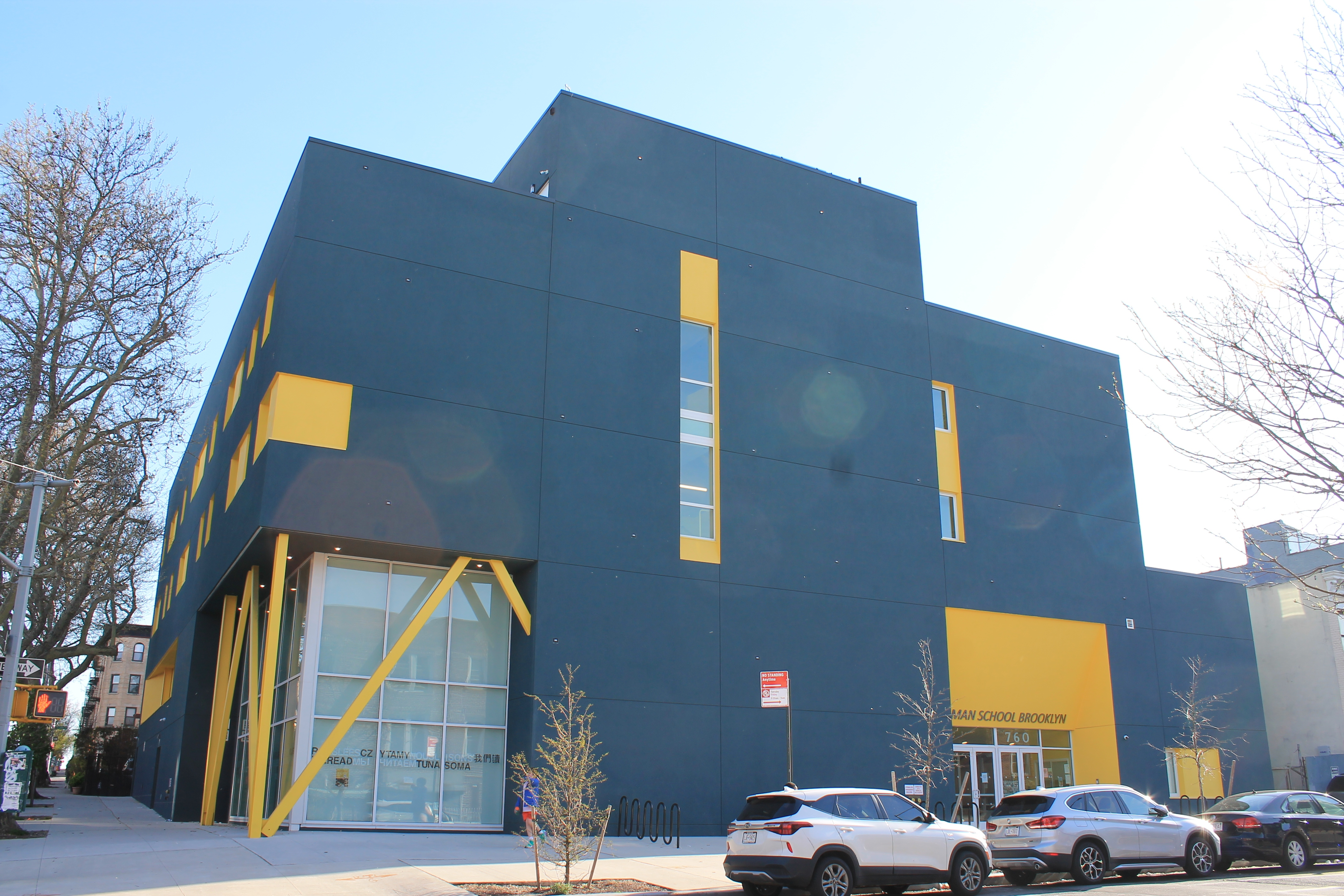
- (2024)

Location
- 760 Sterling Place

Information
- Former name: German School Brooklyn; German: Deutsche Schule Brooklyn
- Language: German; English; Spanish (since 2025)
- Website: www.globalschoolbrooklyn.org

Global School Brooklyn, formerly German School Brooklyn (GSB, German: Deutsche Schule Brooklyn), is a German and Spanish international school in Crown Heights Brooklyn in New York City.

It is categorized as a German school abroad by the Central Agency for German Schools Abroad (Zentralstelle für das Auslandsschulwesen).

== Spanish and German Immersion Program ==
GSB added a Spanish immersion program to its school beginning with a Preschool class in September 2025.

== History ==
GSB was co-founded by Christine Krabs, Kathrin Nagle, Muriel Plag, and Sonja Einoedter. It opened with grades Kindergarten through 2 in 2014. As of June 2025, the school has graduated 4 8th grade classes. In 2024 GSB added a preschool and in 2025 it added a Spanish programme.

The school was previously on the fifth floor of the Union Temple of Brooklyn in Prospect Heights, Brooklyn. The school was not a part of the temple's congregation even though they shared a building. By 2021, its interim location was the former Coop School in the Bedford Stuyvesant and Clinton Hill area. In 2021, the school moved all levels to its new site at 9 Hanover Place in Downtown Brooklyn. In January 2023, the school once again relocated to its new, very own building on 760 Sterling Place in Crown Heights.
