= Prospect Heights, Brooklyn =

Neighborhood in New York City

Prospect Heights
- Neighborhood of Brooklyn
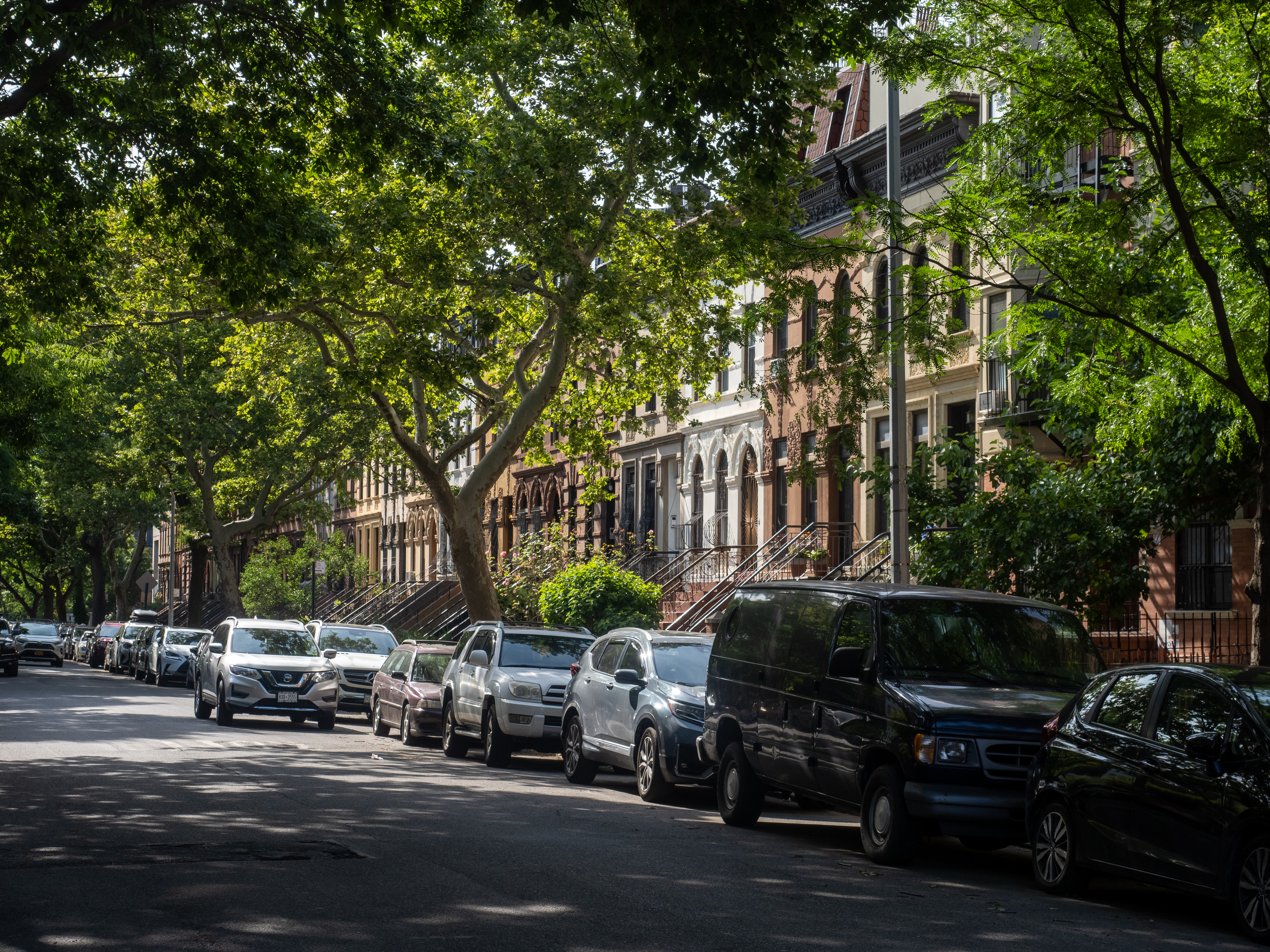
- Location in New York City
- Coordinates: 40°40′40″N 73°58′10″W
- Country: United States
- State: New York
- City: New York City
- Borough: Brooklyn
- Community District: Brooklyn 8

Population (2010)
  - Total: 19,849

Race/Ethnicity
  - White: 51.8%
  - Black: 26.3%
  - Hispanic: 8.1%
  - Asian: 7.7%
  - Other: 6.1%
- Time zone: UTC−05:00 (Eastern)
  - Summer (DST): UTC−04:00 (EDT)
- ZIP Codes: 11217, 11238
- Area code: 718, 347, 929, and 917

Prospect Heights is a neighborhood in the northwest of the New York City borough of Brooklyn. The traditional boundaries are Flatbush Avenue to the west, Atlantic Avenue to the north, Eastern Parkway – beginning at Grand Army Plaza – to the south, and Washington Avenue to the east. In the northern section of Prospect Heights are the Vanderbilt Rail Yards, built over as part of the Pacific Park (formerly Atlantic Yards) project. The Barclays Center, home to the NBA's Brooklyn Nets basketball team, is located in the northwestern corner of the neighborhood in Pacific Park at Flatbush and Atlantic Avenues.

Compared to other Brooklyn neighborhoods, Prospect Heights is relatively small and is notable for its cultural diversity and tree-lined streets. Prospect Heights has seen rapid demographic changes over the 2000s, and its shifts are exemplified by a mixture of older buildings under reconstruction, rows of classic 1890s brownstones, and newly built luxury condominiums. The neighborhood is served by the New York City Police Department's 77th and 78th precincts.

== Boundaries and land use ==
Row houses on Carlton Avenue in Prospect Heights

Along the southern boundary, Eastern Parkway, from Grand Army Plaza to Washington Avenue is reminiscent of Fifth Avenue's "Museum Mile" in Manhattan. Immense, opulent buildings line the north side of the parkway, and the south side features the Brooklyn Central Library, Mount Prospect Park (not to be confused with Prospect Park), the Brooklyn Botanic Garden, and the Brooklyn Museum. To Prospect Heights' north lies Fort Greene, to its south Prospect Park, to its west Park Slope, and to its east Crown Heights. Its portion east of Vanderbilt Avenue is under the jurisdiction of the 77th NYPD precinct; its portion west of Vanderbilt Avenue is under the jurisdiction of the 78th.

The interior portion of the neighborhood consists mostly of brownstone-style residential row house buildings, some built as early as 1890, although some blocks, such as Lincoln and St. Johns Place between Underhill and Washington Avenues, include larger multi-unit apartment buildings.

An upscale, glass high-rise residential building designed by the architect Richard Meier and located off of Grand Army Plaza was completed in 2008.

The Barclays Center opened in 2012.

As demand for housing within Prospect Heights increased, some residents of Crown Heights came to consider Franklin Avenue the western border with Prospect Heights rather than Washington Avenue. However, most residents continue to consider Washington Avenue the border, and Washington Avenue remains the eastern border of Prospect Heights as recognized by major New York City media such as The New York Times, The New York Post, and The Wall Street Journal.

The name "Prospect Heights" can be traced as far back as 1889 to a letter to the editor published in the Brooklyn Eagle, although at that time it was one of several potential names for the neighborhood that has since come to be known as Park Slope. The letter began by noting that it was "amusing to see the attempts made to fix upon a name for the rapidly growing part of Brooklyn near Prospect Park, bounded by Flatbush, Fifth and Ninth avenues, Some call it Park Slope, some Park Hill Side, some Prospect Heights and others Prospect Hill..." Additionally, Prospect Heights once shared the name "Gowanus Heights" with Prospect Park, Greenwood and Bay Ridge.

=== Controversy ===
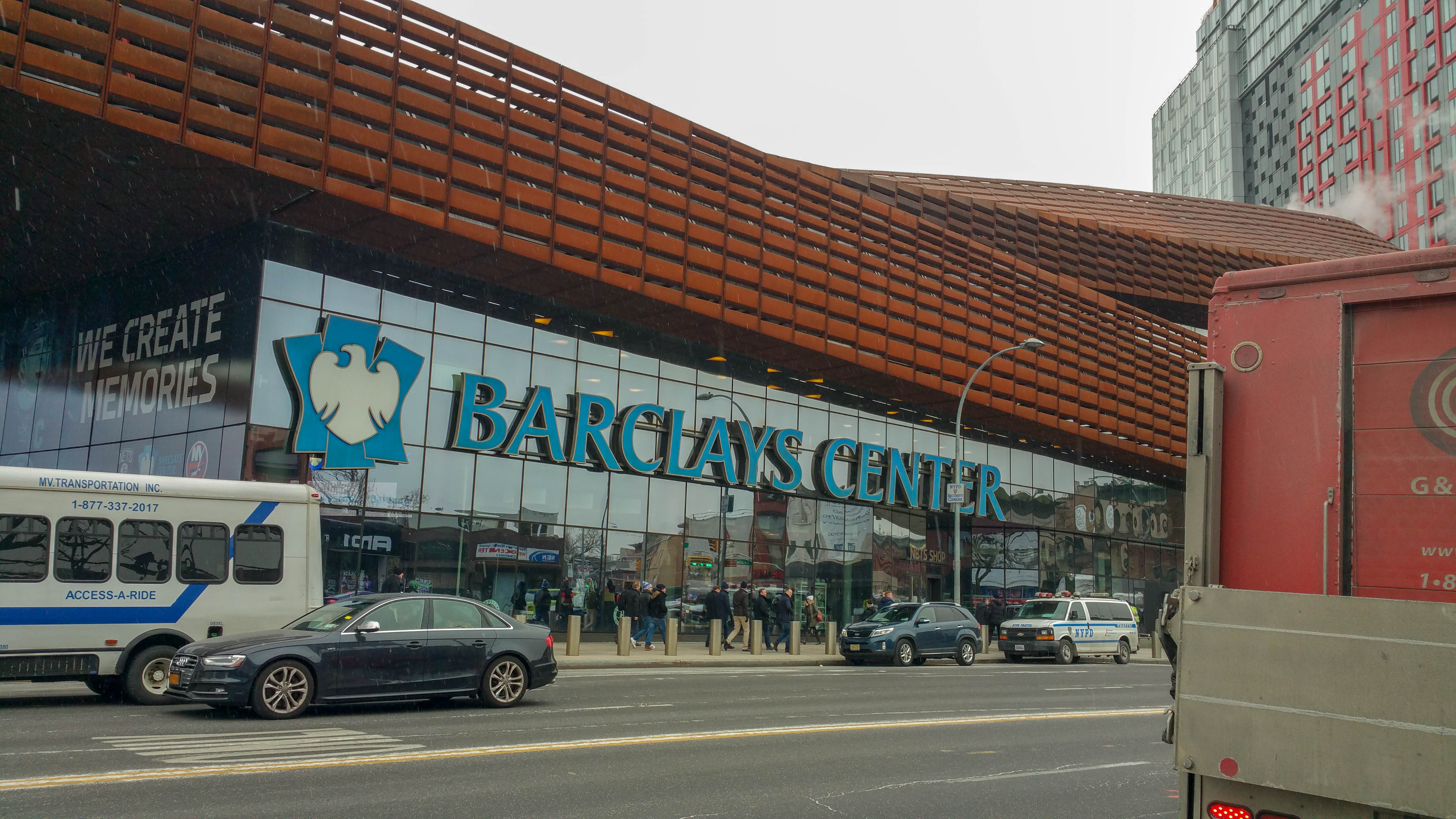
Barclays Center, the home of the Brooklyn Nets

In the late 2000s and early 2010s, the neighborhood experienced controversy over a development project by developer Bruce Ratner, initially designed by the architect Frank Gehry, for the portions of Prospect Heights and Fort Greene known as Pacific Park (formerly Atlantic Yards). This included the construction of the Barclays Center, an arena to serve as a new home for the Brooklyn Nets basketball team, as well as housing and commercial space in a cluster of high-rise buildings much taller than the borough's existing low-rise architecture. A number of community groups opposed the project, claiming abuse of the principles of eminent domain, among other concerns. Supporters of the project believed in its potential for reinvigorating an unattractive space.

== Architecture ==
=== Historic district ===
- Prospect Heights Historic District
- U.S. National Register of Historic Places
- U.S. Historic district
- New York State Register of Historic Places
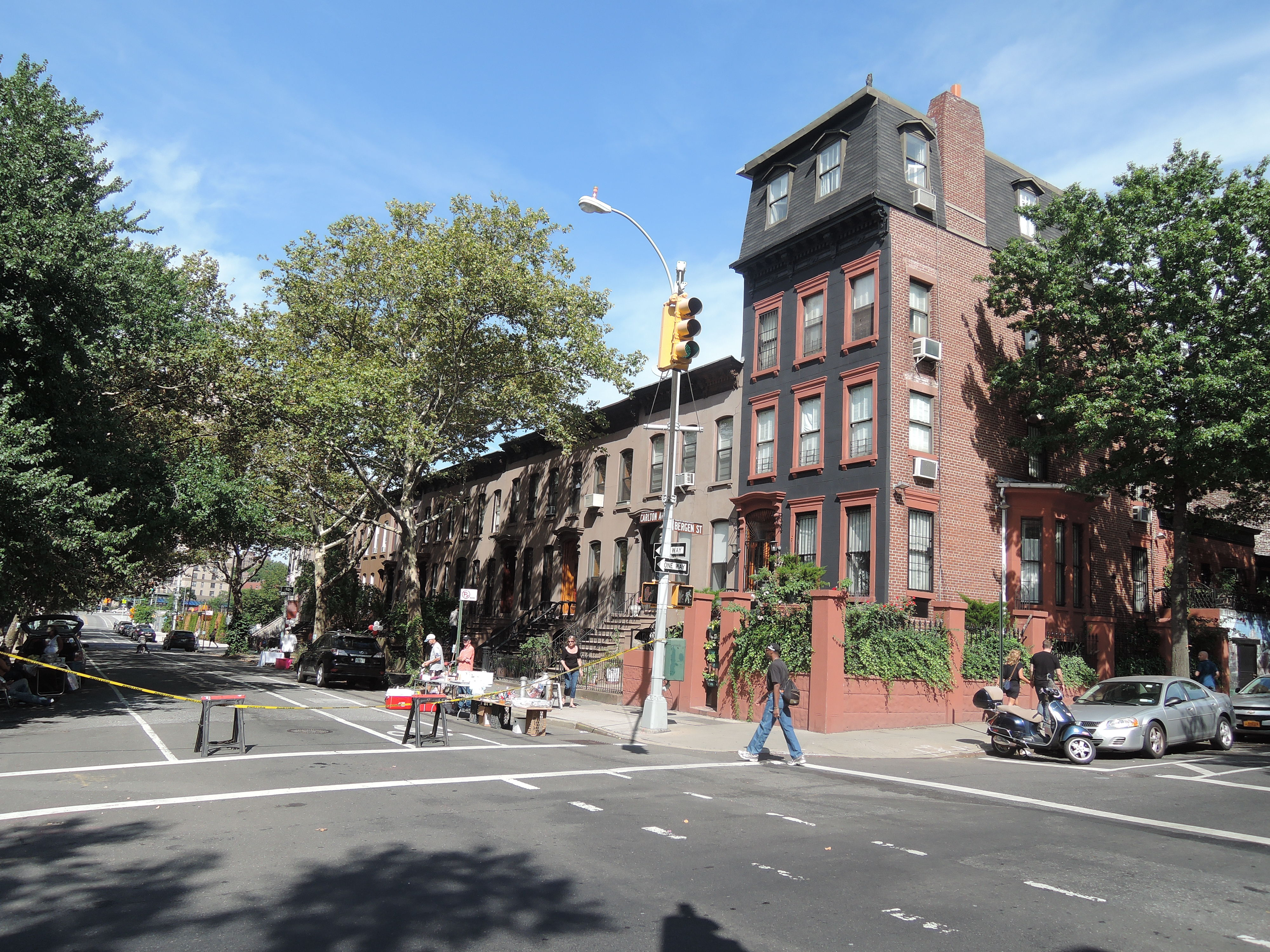
- Bergen Street and Carlton Avenue

- Location within New York City Location within New York Location within the United States
- Location: Roughly bounded by Pacific and Bergen Sts., Flatbush and Vanderbilt Aves., and Park Pl., New York City
- Coordinates: 40°40′44″N 73°58′20″W
- Area: 15 acres (6.1 ha)
- Built: 1865
- Architect: Multiple
- Architectural style: Late Victorian
- NRHP reference No.: 83001698 (original); 16000018 (increase)

Significant dates
- Added to NRHP: September 15, 1983
- Designated NYSRHP: August 3, 1983

The area has many Italianate and Neo-Grec row houses. Much of it is located within the Prospect Heights Historic District, a national historic district, which consists of 305 contributing buildings built between 1865 and about 1900. The district is almost exclusively residential and includes a variety of single family rowhouses and multiple dwellings. They are in a variety of architectural styles popular in the late-19th century. It was listed on the National Register of Historic Places in 1983.

Much of the neighborhood has also been designated a New York City historic district. The Prospect Heights Historic District covers an area roughly bounded by Flatbush Avenue, Sterling Place, Washington Avenue, and St. Marks Avenue, though a section of the historic district extends as far north as Pacific Street. The district was designated by the New York City Landmarks Preservation Commission on June 23, 2009.

=== Other buildings ===
The Co-Cathedral of St. Joseph of the Roman Catholic Diocese of Brooklyn, built in 1912 in Spanish Colonial style, is located at 856 Pacific Street between Vanderbilt and Underhill Avenues in Prospect Heights.

The neighborhood is also notable for its unusual street grid. The original street plan was based upon Lenape Indian paths and the boundaries of Dutch farms. As part of the Commissioners' Plan of 1839, this was redrawn to better match the rest of Brooklyn, resulting in several buildings that are oddly-shaped or face the street at an angle.

== Demographics ==
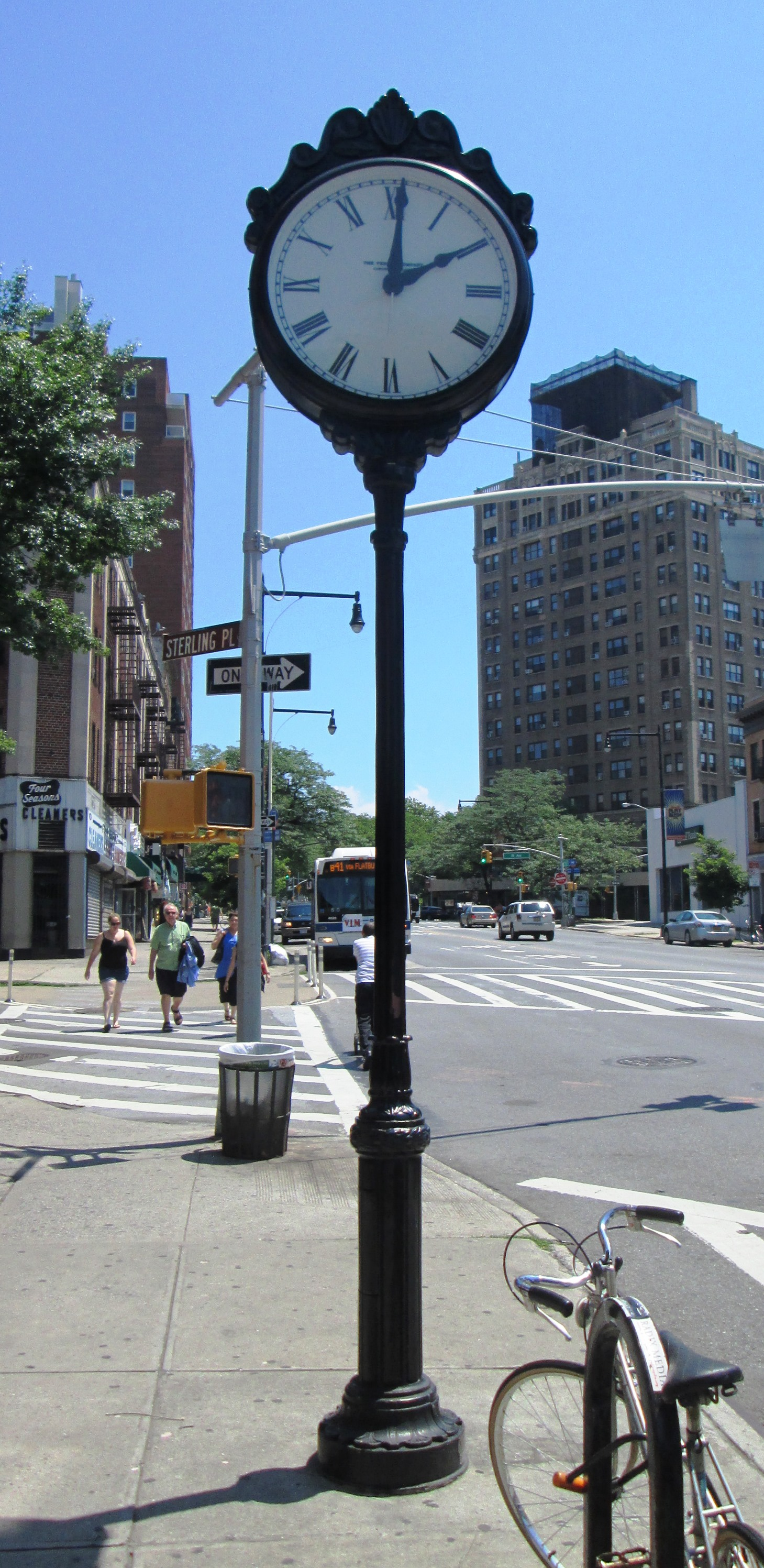
Sidewalk clock on Flatbush Avenue

Based on data from the 2010 United States census, the population of Prospect Heights was 19,849, an increase of 194 (1.0%) from the 19,655 counted in 2000. Covering an area of 237.30 acres (96.03 ha), the neighborhood had a population density of 83.6 inhabitants per acre (53,500/sq mi; 20,700/km^{2}).

The racial makeup of the neighborhood was 47.2% (9,359) White, 30.1% (5,979) African American, 0.2% (34) Native American, 6.6% (1,316) Asian, 0.1% (12) Pacific Islander, 0.5% (106) from other races, and 3.9% (768) from two or more races. Hispanic or Latino of any race were 11.5% (2,275) of the population.

The entirety of Community District 8, which covers Crown Heights North and Prospect Heights, had 97,130 inhabitants as of NYC Health's 2018 Community Health Profile, with an average life expectancy of 79.2 years. This is lower than the median life expectancy of 81.2 for all New York City neighborhoods. Most inhabitants are middle-aged adults and youth: 20% are between the ages of 0–17, 37% between 25 and 44, and 22% between 45 and 64. The ratio of college-aged and elderly residents was lower, at 9% and 12% respectively.

As of 2016, the median household income in Community District 8 was $60,107. In 2018, an estimated 21% of Community District 8 residents lived in poverty, compared to 21% in all of Brooklyn and 20% in all of New York City. One in eleven residents (9%) were unemployed, compared to 9% in the rest of both Brooklyn and New York City. Rent burden, or the percentage of residents who have difficulty paying their rent, is 50% in Community District 8, lower than the citywide and boroughwide rates of 52% and 51% respectively. Based on this calculation, as of 2018, Community District 8 is considered to be gentrifying.

== Culture ==
A diverse ethnic neighborhood in the 1910s through the 1960s, combining Italian, Irish, Jewish, German, Greek and Yankee (Northeastern) residents, Prospect Heights is currently well known for its mixed black and white culture. Every year the West Indian Day Parade, the largest annual parade in New York City, follows Eastern Parkway, beginning in Crown Heights and ending at Grand Army Plaza in Prospect Heights. During the last thirty years, since being gentrified the neighborhood has seen an influx of new residents, increasingly young and white, perhaps due to real estate prices slightly lower than neighboring Park Slope, but the same style of living and proximity to the park. A thriving commercial zone has emerged along Vanderbilt Avenue and Washington Avenue, which since 2000 has seen a surge in new bars, restaurants, and specialty shops, including a restaurant opened by Michelin-starred chef Saul Bolton, and stores emphasizing gourmet ice cream and even, for a while, artisanal mayonnaise.

== Fire safety ==
The New York City Fire Department (FDNY) operates one fire station in Prospect Heights:

- Engine Company 219/Ladder Company 105 – 494 Dean Street

== Health ==
As of 2018, preterm births and births to teenage mothers in Community District 8 are more common than in other places citywide. There were 92 preterm births per 1,000 live births in Community District 8 (compared to 87 per 1,000 citywide) and 24.6 births to teenage mothers per 1,000 live births in Community District 8 (compared to 19.3 per 1,000 citywide). Community District 8 has a relatively high population of residents who are uninsured, or who receive healthcare through Medicaid. In 2018, this population of uninsured residents was estimated to be 12%, compared to the citywide rate of 12%.

The concentration of fine particulate matter, the deadliest type of air pollutant, is 0.008 milligrams per cubic metre (8.0×10^{−9} oz/ft^{3}) in Community District 8, slightly higher than the citywide and boroughwide averages. Eighteen percent of Community District 8 residents are smokers, compared to the city average of 14% of residents being smokers. In Community District 8, 26% of residents are obese, 13% are diabetic, and 33% have high blood pressure—compared to the citywide averages of 24%, 11%, and 28% respectively. In addition, 19% of children are obese in Community District 8, compared to the citywide average of 20%.

Eighty-four percent of Community District 8 residents eat some fruits and vegetables every day, which is slightly lower than the city's average of 87%. In 2018, 78% of Community District 8 residents described their health as "good", "very good", or "excellent", compared to the city's average of 78%. For every supermarket, there are 25 bodegas in Community District 8.

== Post offices and ZIP Codes ==
Prospect Heights is covered by ZIP Codes 11217 and 11238. The United States Postal Service operates two post offices nearby: the Times Plaza Annex Station at 594 Dean Street, and the Adelphi Station at 950 Fulton Street.

== Education ==
Community District 8 generally has a similar ratio of college-educated residents to the rest of the city as of 2018. In Community District 8, 44% of residents age 25 and older have a college education or higher, while 16% have less than a high school education and 40% are high school graduates or have some college education. By contrast, 40% of Brooklynites and 38% of city residents have a college education or higher. The percentage of Community District 8 students excelling in reading and math has been increasing, with reading achievement rising from 31 percent in 2000 to 37 percent in 2011, and math achievement rising from 22 percent to 47 percent within the same time period.

Community District 8's rate of elementary school student absenteeism is higher than the rest of New York City. The proportion of elementary school students who missed twenty or more days per school year was 28% in Community District 8, compared to the citywide average of 20% of students. Additionally, 71% of high school students in Community District 8 graduate on time, compared to the citywide average of 75% of students.

=== Schools ===
Prospect Heights contains the following public schools:

- PS 9 Sarah Smith Garnet, formerly PS 9 Teunis G Bergen (grades PK–5)
- IS 340 (grades 6–8)
- Pacific Park Campus (grades 6–8)

German School Brooklyn, a German international school, was once on the fifth floor of the Union Temple of Brooklyn. In 2021 the school moved all levels to 9 Hanover Place in Downtown Brooklyn.

=== Library ===
The Brooklyn Public Library's Brooklyn Central Library is located at Grand Army Plaza, on the southern side of Prospect Heights.

== Transportation ==
Five New York City Bus lines serve Prospect Heights:

- B41: to Bergen Beach/Mill Basin or Downtown Brooklyn via Flatbush Avenue
- B45: to Crown Heights or Downtown Brooklyn via Atlantic and Washington Avenues
- B65: to Crown Heights or Downtown Brooklyn via Bergen and Dean Streets
- B67: to Kensington or Brooklyn Navy Yard via Flatbush Avenue
- B69: to Kensington or Dumbo via Vanderbilt Avenue

Several New York City Subway stations are located in Prospect Heights. The IRT Eastern Parkway Line (2 and 3 trains) has stations at Bergen Street, Grand Army Plaza, and Brooklyn Museum, while the BMT Brighton Line (B and Q trains) has a station at Seventh Avenue.

== Notable residents ==
- Amy DuBois Barnett (born 1969), magazine editor who was formerly editor-in-chief of Ebony magazine
- Barbara Barrie (born 1931), actress
- Matt Berninger (born 1971), musician
- Matt Bomer, actor
- Clara Bow, actress
- Jabari Brisport (born 1987), politician, activist, and former public school teacher who represents New York's 25th State Senate district.
- Foxy Brown (born 1978), rapper
- Paul Byard (1939–2008), lawyer and architect
- Melissa Clark, food writer, cookbook author and columnist for The New York Times
- Aaron Copland (1900–1990), composer
- Howard Cosell (1918–1995), sports journalist, broadcaster and author
- Soffiyah Elijah, lawyer, author and social justice activist
- Bobby Fischer, chess grandmaster lived on Lincoln Place near Underhill
- MC Frontalot, founder, Nerdcore
- Keith Gessen, co-editor-in-chief of n+1, novelist
- Montego Glover, actress
- Diana al-Hadid (born 1981), artist who creates sculptures, installations, and drawings
- Hakeem Jeffries (born 1970), U.S. Representative for New York's 8th congressional district and House Minority Leader
- Ingrid Michaelson, singer, songwriter
- Isa Chandra Moskowitz, vegan chef, cookbook writer, and host of "The Post Punk Kitchen", which is filmed in Prospect Heights
- Michael Moss, Pulitzer Prize winning author
- Eddie Ocampo, drummer
- Joe Pepitone, NY Yankees player lived on St. Mark's Avenue between Vanderbilt and Washington
- Joan Rivers (1933–2014), comedian
- Mark Rudd (born 1947), leader in the 1960s' Weather Underground, and Columbia University's 1968 protests. When he lived "underground" in the early 1970s, it was in one of the large apartment buildings on Plaza Street.
- Emanuel Weiss, member of the Mafia hit squad Murder, Inc. during the 1930s
- Tobias Wilner, musician
