= Nathan S. Jonas =

Jewish-American banker (1868-1943)

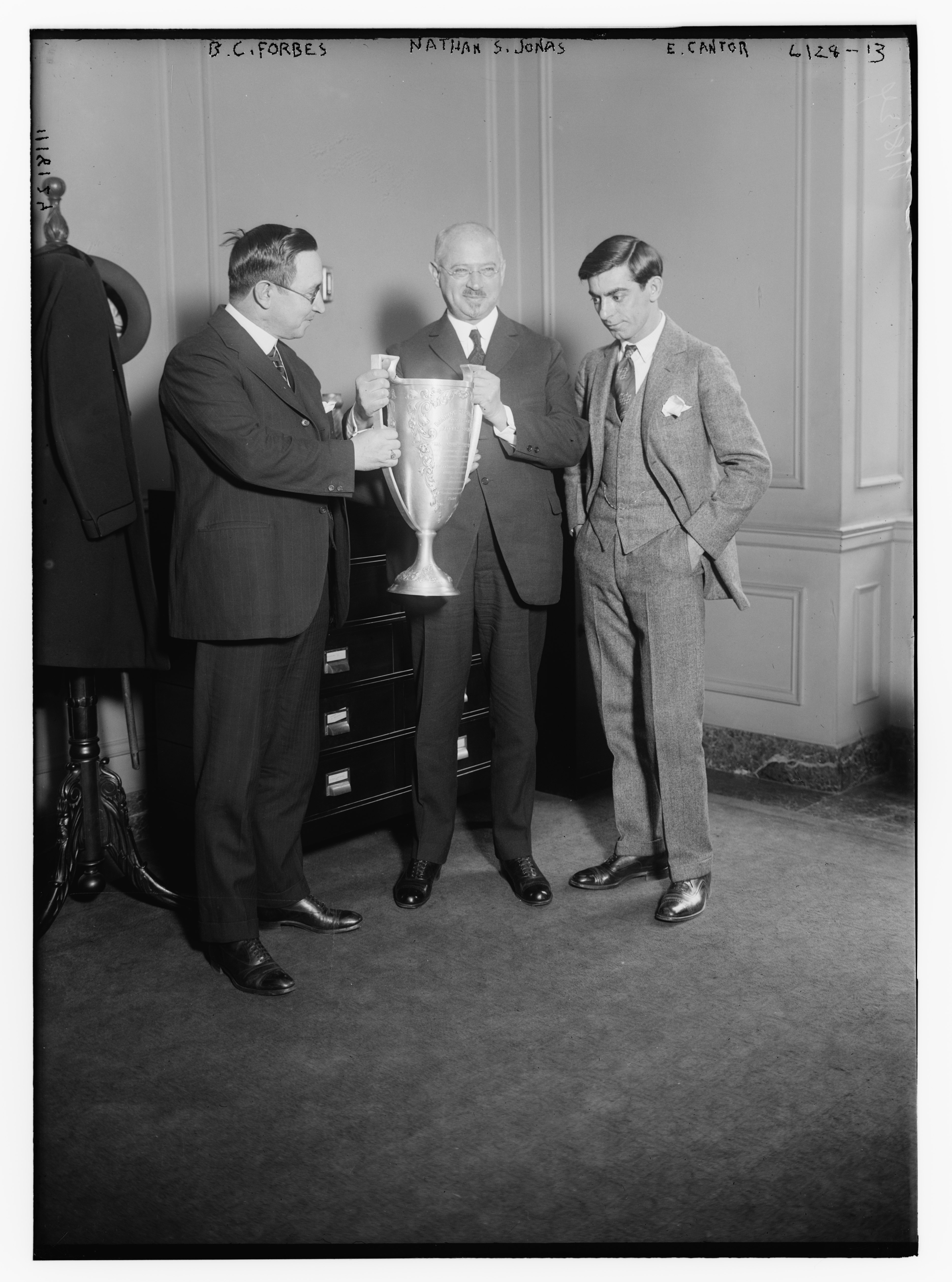

Nathan Solomon Jonas (August 1, 1868 – October 17, 1943) was a Jewish-American banker and philanthropist from Brooklyn.

== Life ==
Jonas was born on August 1, 1868, in Montgomery, Alabama, the son of Jacob Jonas and Bella Mayer. His father was a German immigrant from Düsseldorf who immigrated to America in 1848, became a cigar manufacturer in Montgomery, and served as a Confederate soldier in the American Civil War. His brother was lawyer Ralph Jonas.

Jonas moved to Brooklyn, New York, with his family in 1869. He attended grammar school there, and when he was thirteen he began working as an errand boy for the New York Safe Deposit Company while studying bookkeeping in a commercial school at night. He later became bookkeeper for J. Ullman & Sons, wholesale dealers in baskets and willow ware. When the firm was acquired by Charles Zinn & Co., he worked for them as a traveling salesman. From 1895 to 1905, he was the Brooklyn representative of the Northwestern Mutual Life Insurance Company of Milwaukee, Wisconsin. In 1905, a group of businessmen made him president of a new bank they were organizing, the Citizens' Trust Company. A year later, he helped found the Summer Savings Bank of Brooklyn, becoming vice-president and a trustee of the bank prior to its later merger with the Lincoln Savings Bank. The Citizens' Trust Company purchased the Broadway Bank of Brooklyn in 1912, and in 1914 it acquired the Manufacturers National Bank of Brooklyn. Following the latter purchase, the bank was renamed the Manufacturers-Citizens Trust Company, and in 1915 it was again renamed to the Manufacturers Trust Company. He served as president of the bank until he resigned in 1929, after which he became chairman of the board until he retired in 1931.

Jonas was an influential member of the New York State Chamber of Commerce and was identified with the Brooklyn and Queens Chambers of Commerce. In 1902, Mayor Seth Low appointed him a member of the New York City Board of Education. Mayor George B. McClellan Jr. retained him on the Board, and he continued to serve on it until 1909. Active in civic and philanthropic affairs, he was a founder and president of the Brooklyn Jewish Hospital as well as an organizer and first president of Brooklyn Federation of Jewish Charities. In 1940, he wrote his autobiography, Through the Years. He was a delegate to the 1932 Democratic National Convention and a presidential elector for the 1932 presidential election.

Jonas was a member of the Brooklyn Institute of Arts and Sciences, the New York Horticultural Society, the Freemasons, the Elks, the Iroquois and Unity clubs of Brooklyn, the Soundview Golf Club of Great Neck, the Fresh Meadow Country Club of Flushing, and the Lakeville Golf and Country Club of Great Neck. He helped organize the latter two clubs. During World War I, he was active in various Liberty Loan campaigns and served as treasurer of the United War Work campaign in Brooklyn. He was an honorary trustee of the Union Temple of Brooklyn. In 1893, he married Jennie Strauss. They had two children, Isabel (wife of Jules Edmund Rosenthal) and Jay Seth (who predeceased Jonas).

Jonas died at the Jewish Hospital of Brooklyn from a heart attack on October 17, 1943. Over a thousand people attended his funeral at Union Temple, including officials from the city, state and federal government, judiciary members, and active leaders of the borough philanthropies. Edward Lazansky, former, Brooklyn Bar Association president Adolph Feldblum, and Rabbi Simon S. Tedesche of Union Temple delivered eulogies, with Tedesche officiating the funeral service. It was also attended by, among other people, Brooklyn Democratic leader Frank V. Kelly, Martin's department store president Frez Zeitz and vice-president Harry Zeitz, Emerson Radio Corporation president Benjamin Abrams, Prudential Savings Bank president Fred Goess, Manufacturers Trust Company vice chairman Henry C. Von Elm, Brooklyn Hebrew Orphan Asylum president Maurice Rosenfeld, Jewish Hospital acting president Isidor Leviton, hospital president Captain Alin Rosenson, Dr. Emanuel Libman, Congregation Emanu-El rabbi emeritus Nathan Krass, and New York Supreme Court Justices Charles C. Lockwood, Harry E. Lewis, Meier Steinbrink, Algernon I. Nova, and Philip M. Kleinfeld. He was buried in Maimonides Cemetery in Brooklyn.
