= Union Temple of Brooklyn =

Synagogue building in Brooklyn, New York

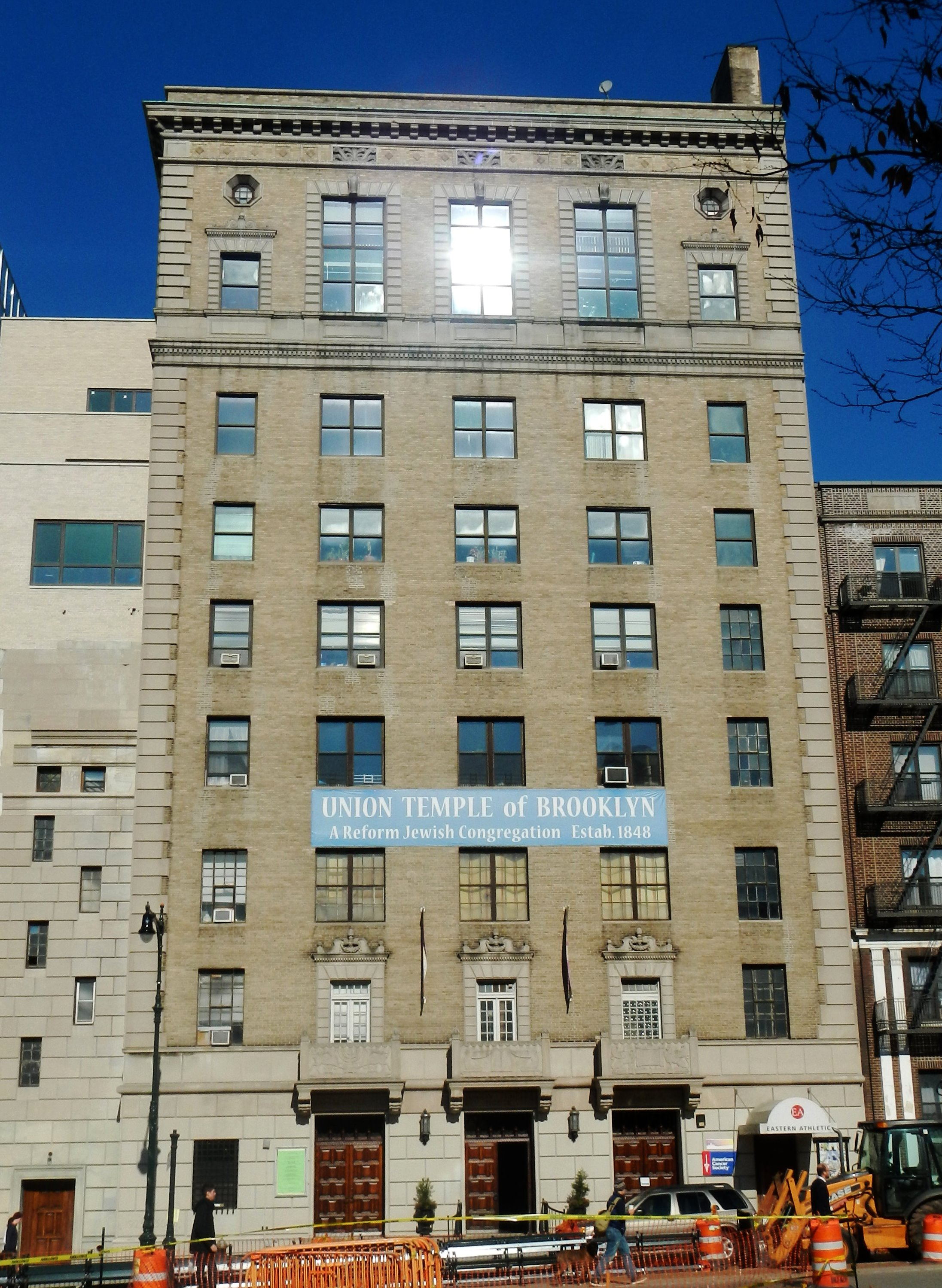

- Location of the former synagogue and NHRP building in New York City

Religion
- Affiliation: Reform Judaism (former)
- Ecclesiastical or organisational status: Synagogue (1921–2021)
- Status: Closed; merged with Congregation Beth Elohim

Location
- Location: 17 Eastern Parkway, Brooklyn, New York City, New York
- Country: United States
- Coordinates: 40°40′24″N 73°58′4.5″W

Architecture
- Architect: Arnold Brunner
- Type: Synagogue
- Style: Neo-Classical
- Established: 1921 (as a congregation)
- Completed: 1929
- Union Temple of Brooklyn
- U.S. National Register of Historic Places
- New York State Register of Historic Places
- Area: Less than 1 acre (0.40 ha)
- NRHP reference No.: 15000232
- NYSRHP No.: 04701.018565

Significant dates
- Added to NRHP: May 18, 2015
- Designated NYSRHP: March 30, 2015

The Union Temple of Brooklyn was a Reform Jewish synagogue located at 17 Eastern Parkway between Underhill Avenue and Plaza Street East in the Prospect Heights neighborhood of Brooklyn, New York City, across the street from the Brooklyn Public Library, the Brooklyn Museum, and the Brooklyn Botanic Garden.

Union Temple was the result of the merger of two nineteenth century congregations, K. K. Beth Elohim and Temple Israel. Most recently, the synagogue was led by Rabbi Stephanie Kolin.

The building was designed by Arnold Brunner and completed in 1929 as the community house for a planned temple next door, which was never built because of the Great Depression; the 11-story building has been used for the congregation's worship since, except, in the past, on High Holy Days, when the Brooklyn Academy of Music was utilized. In 1942, a theatre in the building was remodeled to be a sanctuary.

In 2015 the Union Temple building was listed on the National Register of Historic Places. In 2020 Union Temple engaged in merger talks with Congregation Beth Elohim, resulting in a merger on March 26, 2021.

== K. K. Beth Elohim ==
Founded in 1848 by German and Alsatian Jewish immigrants living in the village of Williamsburgh, K.K. Beth Elohim was the first Jewish congregation established in Brooklyn and the first on Long Island. Prior to its closure, it was a member congregation of the Union for Reform Judaism.

The congregation first worshiped in a private home on Marcy Avenue. In 1860 a former church building on South First Street was purchased and remodeled for use as a synagogue, it was afterwards used as a school offered elementary education in English and German, in both secular and religious subjects. The school closed when public education began in Brooklyn.

A new synagogue was built on Keap Street south of Division Avenue in 1876. Known as the Keap Street Temple, for many years it was the largest synagogue in Brooklyn. It is among the oldest synagogue buildings still standing in the United States.

Raphael Benjamin was rabbi of the synagogue from 1902 to 1905.

== Temple Israel ==
Temple Israel was founded in 1869. Until 1872 services were held in the Y.M.C.A. building on the corner of Fulton Street and Galatin Place in Williamsburg, Brooklyn. In that year the congregation purchased a former church building on Greene Avenue. Temple Israel dedicated a larger and more magnificent new building on the corner of Bedford and Lafayette Avenues in 1891.

Raphael Lasker served as rabbi of the Temple from 1871 to 1876.

== Union Temple ==
Temple Israel and K.K. Beth Elohim merged in 1921, deciding to erect a new temple in the newly fashionable location of 17 Eastern Parkway (Brooklyn). Plans were drawn up by Arnold Brunner for a Neo-Classical temple with an adjacent eleven-story community house. The community house was erected first, and dedicated in 1929. Because of the Great Depression, the planned Temple was never built. Instead, the congregation continued to worship in the Community House. During the High Holy Days the congregation worshiped at the Brooklyn Academy of Music. In 1942, the theater on the ground floor of the Community House was remodeled as a sanctuary, designed after the old synagogue in Essen, Germany burned by the Nazis.

=== Inside ===
A memorial plaque in honor of Mickey Marcus is located in the lobby of the Union Temple of Brooklyn where his funeral service was conducted. It reads:

"Killed in action in the hills of Zion while leading Israeli forces as their supreme commander in the struggle for Israel's freedom—Blessed is the match that is consumed in kindling flame/ Blessed is the flame that burns in the secret fastness of the heart/ Blessed is the heart with strength to stop its beating for honor's sake/ Blessed is the match that is consumed in kindling flame—Dedicated by his fellow members of Union Temple of Brooklyn December 9, 1949."

=== Victim of antisemitic hate speech ===
On November 1, 2018, events at Union Temple were cancelled after "Kill All Jews" and graffiti was found inside. New York mayor Bill de Blasio said it was "the vilest kind of hate." Police accused James Polite, a Brooklyn native.

=== Subsequent use ===
In Union Temple's later years, the congregation was finding other tenants for its historic building.

The German School Brooklyn (GSB), a German government-recognized German international school, was on the facility's fifth floor. The school is not a part of the temple's congregation even though it shared the building. Due to its steady growth, GSB since moved Crown Heights.

As of 2023 the building had become a cultural hub. It was the host for two preschools, fitness centers, artistic performances, weddings, and a variety of events and organizations serving about 2500 people per week. The former sanctuary is rented out as a performance space.

== Notable members ==
- Nathan S. Jonas (1868–1943) – banker and philanthropist
- Sidney Tedesche (1889/1890–1962) – rabbi of Union Temple from 1929–1954; emeritus rabbi from 1954–1962. An expert on the Egyptian Jewish community in Alexandria during the era of Hellenistic Judaism, and a PhD. He published translations of Greek works including 1 Maccabees, 2 Maccabees, and the Book of Esdras.
- Max Rose (born 1986) – US congressman of New York's 11th congressional district from 2019–2021, and a US Army Bronze Star recipient

== See also ==
- National Register of Historic Places listings in Kings County, New York
- Oldest synagogues in the United States
- Brooklyn Hebrew Orphan Asylum
