= Park Slope Jewish Center =

Synagogue in Brooklyn, New York

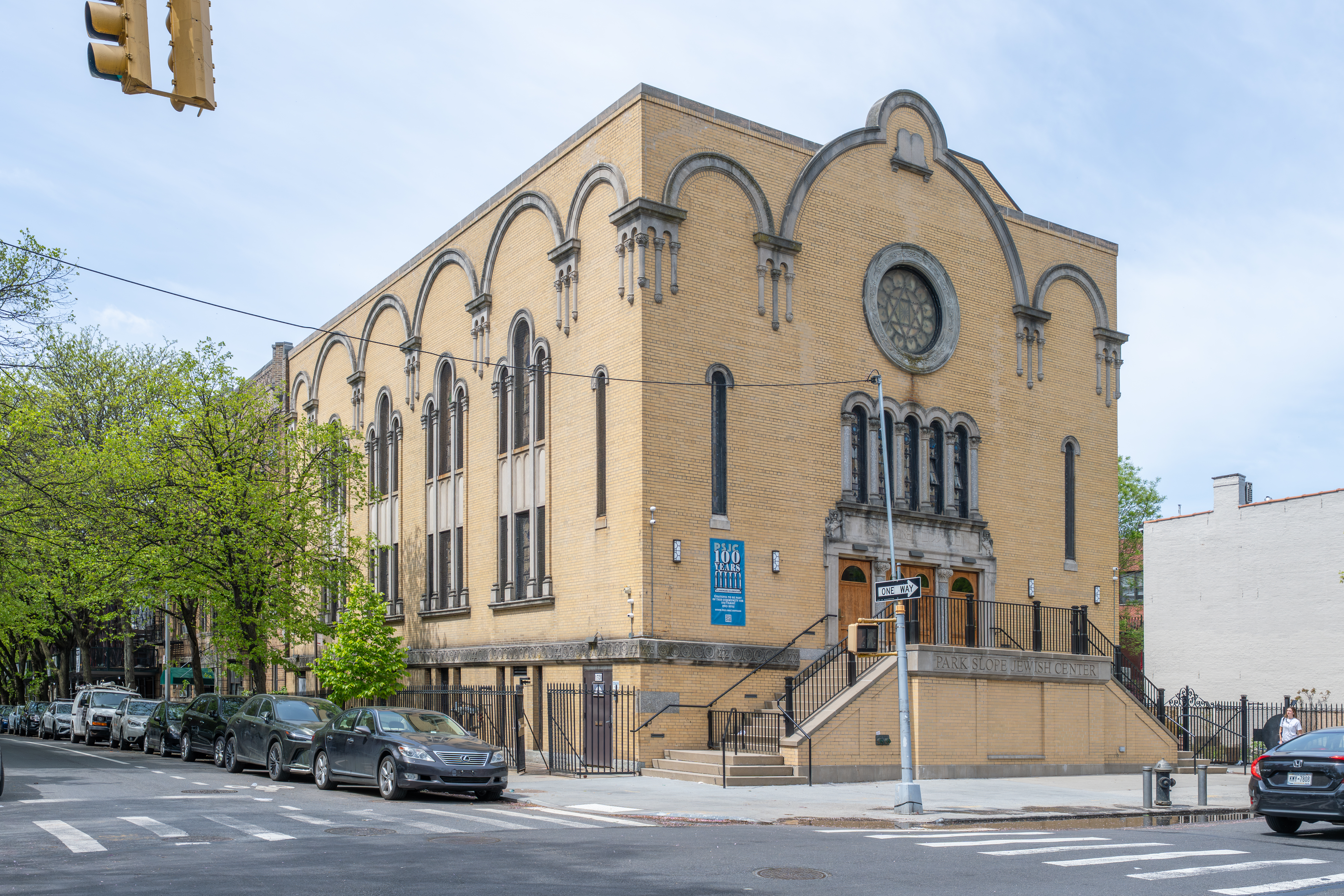
- Park Slope Jewish Center, 2026

- Location in Brooklyn, New York City

Religion
- Affiliation: Conservative Judaism
- Ecclesiastical or organisational status: Synagogue
- Leadership: Rabbi Carie Carter, Rabbi Hayley Goldstein
- Status: Active

Location
- Location: 1320 Eighth Avenue, South Slope, Brooklyn, New York City, New York
- Country: United States
- Coordinates: 40°39′46.7″N 73°58′54″W

Architecture
- Architect: Allen A. Blaustein
- Type: Synagogue
- Style: Romanesque and Baroque elements
- Established: c. 1915 (as a congregation)
- Completed: 1925

Website
- psjc.org
- Park Slope Jewish Center
- U.S. National Register of Historic Places
- New York State Register of Historic Places
- Built: 1925
- NRHP reference No.: 01001442
- NYSRHP No.: 04701.015342

Significant dates
- Added to NRHP: January 11, 2002
- Designated NYSRHP: November 2, 2001

The Park Slope Jewish Center is an egalitarian Conservative synagogue located at 1320 Eighth Avenue in South Slope, Brooklyn, New York City, New York, United States.

Established as a congregation in c. 1915, from 1942 to 1960 they were known as Congregation B'nai Jacob - Tifereth Israel.

== Overview ==
The synagogue was built in 1925 as the Orthodox Congregation B'nai Jacob, and is a 2 1/2-story brick building with Romanesque and Baroque style elements. It features the Star of David on exterior masonry, a rose window, and a domed skylight.

The building was listed on the National Register of Historic Places in 2002.

A $1.75 million renovation and expansion was completed in 2015. Rabbi Carie Carter has served the congregation since 2000.
