= Brooklyn Hebrew Orphan Asylum =

Orphanage in New York City

Coordinates: 40.67608°N 73.92199°W

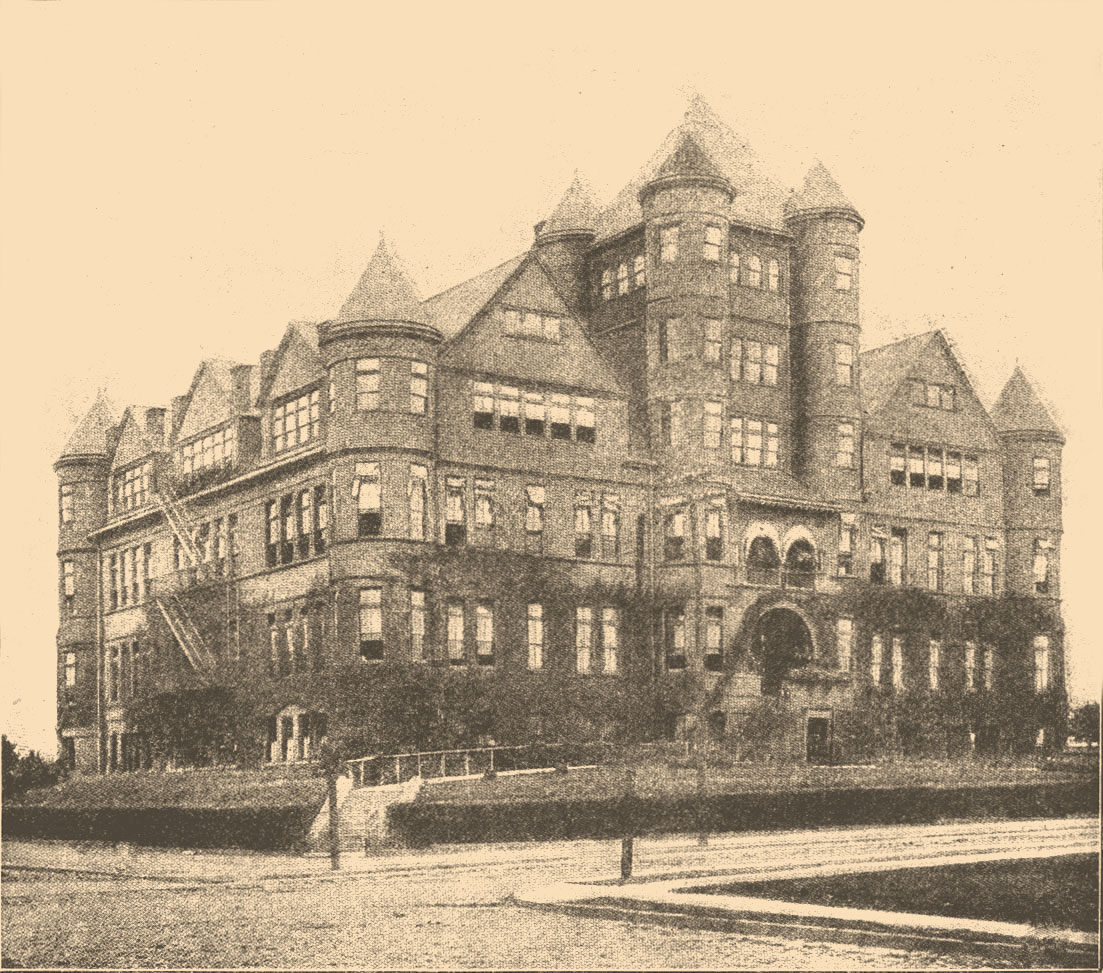
- 373 Ralph Avenue, Brooklyn, New York
- Predecessor: Hebrew Orphan Asylum of New York
- Founders: Temple Israel and K.K. Beth Elohim
- Legal status: Orphanage
- Headquarters: 373 Ralph Avenue
- Location: Brooklyn, United States
- Region served: Brooklyn

The Brooklyn Hebrew Orphan Asylum was an orphanage constructed in Brooklyn, New York. The Brooklyn Hebrew Orphan Asylum branched off from the Hebrew Orphan Asylum of New York when that organization narrowed its support to children in Manhattan. The Brooklyn organization was created by philanthropic members of Temple Israel and K.K. Beth Elohim. Among those who spent part of their childhood there are Hannah Tompkins and eden ahbez.
