= Isaac Landman =

American rabbi

Isaac Landman (October 24, 1880 – September 4, 1946) was an American Reform rabbi, author and anti-Zionist activist. He was editor of the ten-volume The Universal Jewish Encyclopedia.

== Biography ==
Landman was born in Russia on October 4, 1880, to Ada and Louis Landman. He emigrated to the United States in 1890. He graduated from the Reform Hebrew Union College. In 1911, with the assistance of Jacob Schiff, Julius Rosenwald, and Simon Bamberger, he founded a Jewish farm colony in Utah. In 1913 he married Beatrice Eschner. During World War I he was "said to be the first Jewish chaplain in the United States Army to serve on foreign soil".

He was a leader in Jewish–Christian ecumenism. He was editor of American Hebrew Magazine from 1918, served as the delegate of the Union of American Hebrew Congregations to the 1919 Paris Peace Conference.

Landman had also been a prominent opponent of Zionism: when, in 1922, the United States Congress was considering the Lodge–Fish resolution in support of the Balfour Declaration, Landman and Rabbi David Philipson had presented the Reform movement's (then) anti-Zionist position to the House Committee on Foreign Affairs. Landman also printed many opinions against the resolution and Zionism in his American Hebrew Magazine. The bill was eventually unanimously supported by both houses of Congress, and approved by President Harding.

He became rabbi of Brooklyn's Congregation Beth Elohim in 1931. Three years later he began editing the Universal Jewish Encyclopedia, which was published in ten volumes in the 1940s. He died on September 4, 1946.
