= List of University of Cincinnati people =

This is a list of encyclopedic people associated with the University of Cincinnati.

== University presidents ==
The following persons has led the University of Cincinnati and its predecessors as president since 1819:

No.	Image	President	Term start	Term end	Refs.
Presidents of Cincinnati College (1819–1845)
1a		Elijah Slack	1819	1822	
2		Philander Chase	1822	1823	
1b		Elijah Slack	1823	1836	
3		William Holmes McGuffey	1836	1839	
4		Thomas J. Biggs	1839	1845	
5		Rufus King	1860	1869	
6		Robert Buchanan	1867	1869	
Presidents of the University of Cincinnati (1870–present)
7		George H. Harper	1873	1873	
8a		Henry Turner Eddy	1874	1875	
9		Thomas Vickers	1877	1884	
8b		Henry Turner Eddy	1884	1884	
10		Jacob D. Cox	1885	1889	
8c		Henry Turner Eddy	1889	1891 (Note: Resigned to head Rose Polytechnic Institute)	
11a		Wayland R. Benedict	1891	1891	
12a		Edward Wyllys Hyde	1892	1893	
13		William Oliver Sproull	1893	1894	
11b		Wayland R. Benedict	1894	1894	
12b		Edward Wyllys Hyde	1894	1895	
14		Philip van Ness Myers	1895	1896	
12c		Edward Wyllys Hyde	1896	1898	
15		Howard Ayers	September 25, 1899	April 18, 1904	
16 acting		Joseph E. Harry	April 18, 1904	June 30, 1904	
17		Charles W. Dabney	July 1, 1904	August 31, 1920	
18		Frederick C. Hicks	September 1, 1920	January 31, 1928	
acting		Herman Schneider	February 1, 1928	June 5, 1929	
19		Herman Schneider	June 5, 1929	August 31, 1932	
20		Raymond Walters	September 1, 1932	August 31, 1955	
21		Walter C. Langsam	September 1, 1955	August 31, 1971	
22		Warren G. Bennis	September 1, 1971	July 1, 1977	
acting		Henry R. Winkler	July 1, 1977	December 14, 1977	
23		Henry R. Winkler	December 14, 1977	June 30, 1984	
24		Joseph A. Steger	July 6, 1984	September 30, 2003	
25		Nancy L. Zimpher	October 1, 2003	May 31, 2009 (Note: Resigned to head the State University of New York)	
26 interim		Monica Rimai	June 1, 2009	October 31, 2009	
27		Gregory H. Williams	November 1, 2009	August 21, 2012	
interim		Santa J. Ono	August 21, 2012	October 22, 2012 (Note: Resigned to head the University of British Columbia)	
28		Santa J. Ono	October 22, 2012	July 14, 2016	
29 interim		Beverly J. Davenport	July 15, 2016	February 19, 2017	
30		Neville Pinto	February 20, 2017	present	

NOTE: Unlike other universities, the University of Cincinnati includes interim leaders in the official count of university presidents. For example, Santa J. Ono is considered the 28th president instead of 26th, and Neville Pinto is considered the 30th president instead of 27th.

Table notes:

== Notable alumni ==
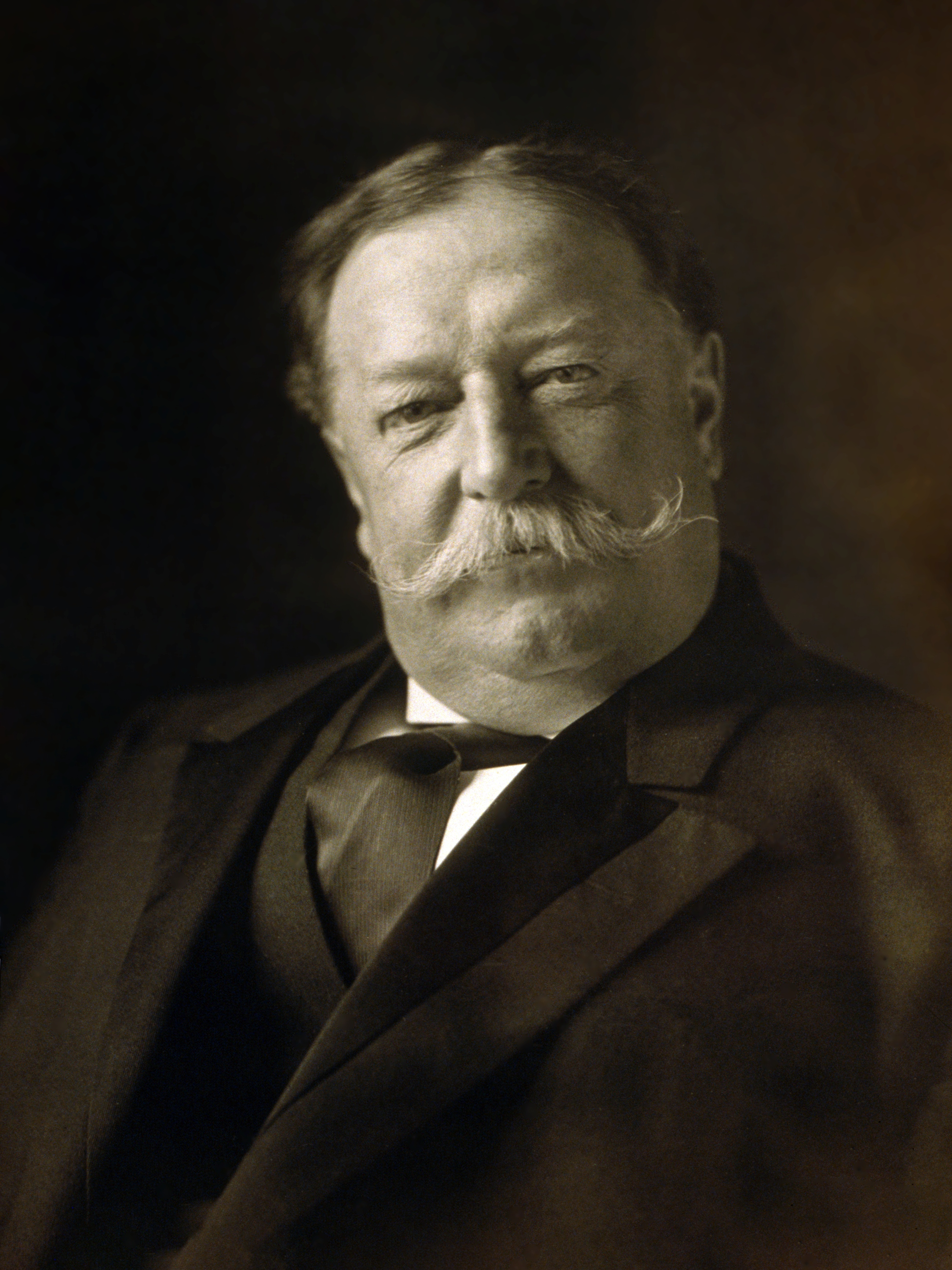
William Howard Taft

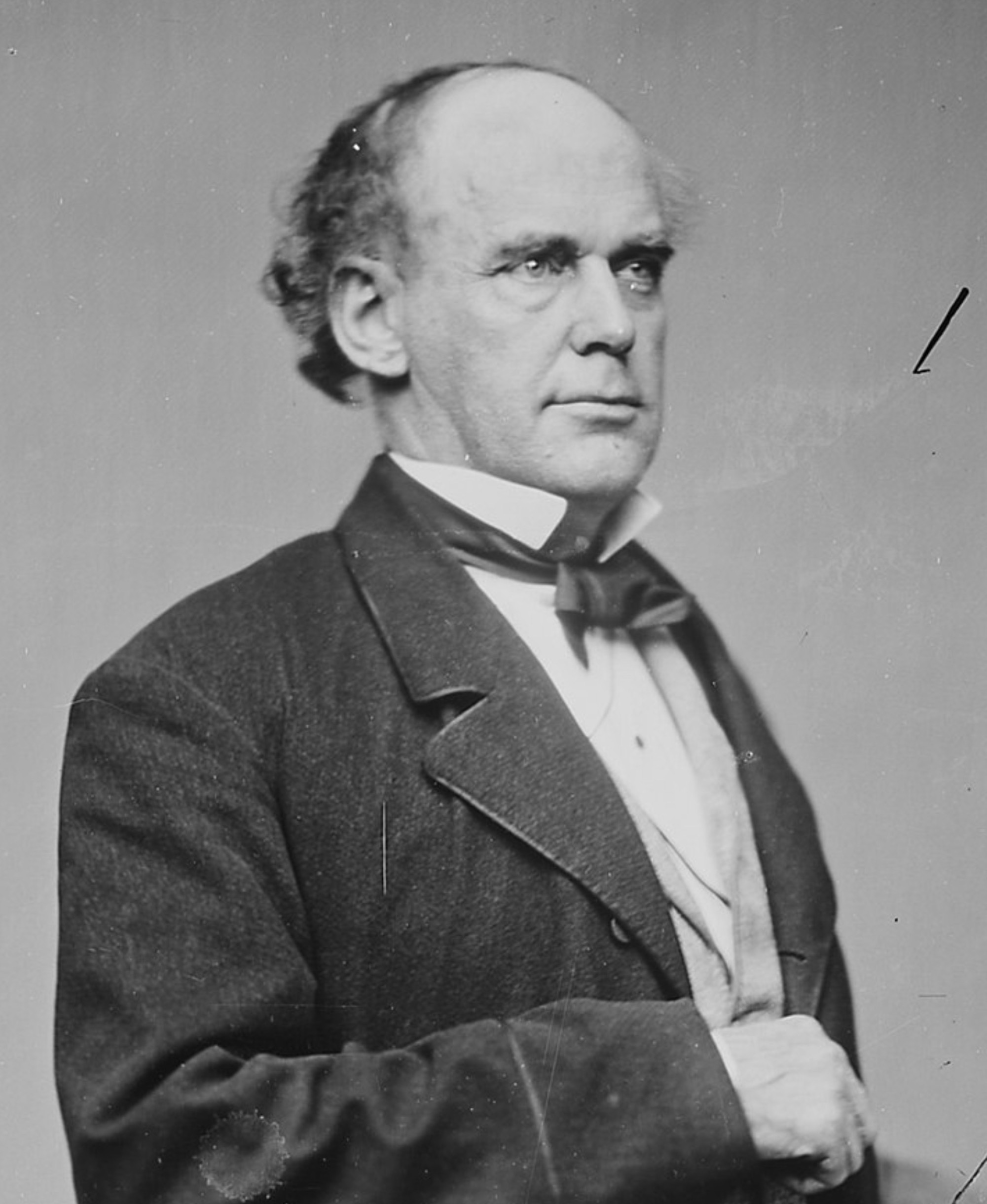
Salmon P. Chase

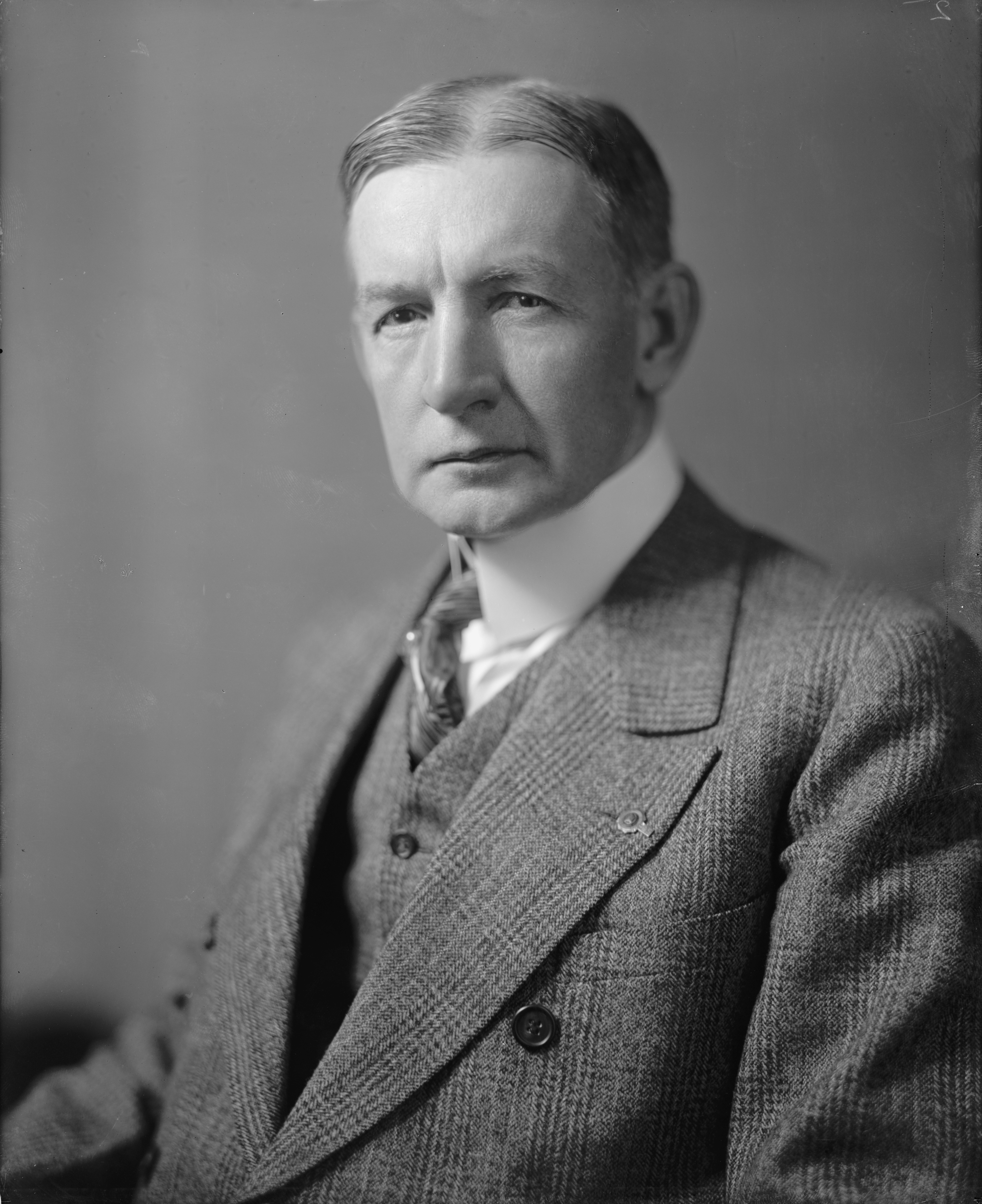
Charles Dawes

Those listed include graduates of the university, as well as attendees.

- David Applebaum, Israeli physician
- Frank P. Austin, celebrity interior designer
- Jeff Austin, musician, Yonder Mountain String Band
- Juan N. Babauta, graduate, governor of United States Commonwealth of Northern Mariana Islands
- Judith Baker, judoka
- Theda Bara, silent-film actress
- John Bardo, educator, president of Wichita State University, chancellor of Western Carolina University
- Shari Barkin, pediatrician
- John Barrett, graduate, CEO and president of Western & Southern Financial Group
- Israel Bettan, rabbi and professor
- Rachel Barton Butler, playwright
- Kathleen Battle, graduate, Grammy Award-winning singer of New York Metropolitan Opera
- Shoshana Bean, musical theater graduate, Broadway actress
- David Bell, author
- Stanley Rossiter Benedict, inventor of Benedict's reagent
- Christopher L. Bennett, author
- Raoul Berger, professor at the UC Berkeley School of Law and Harvard Law School, early theorist of originalism
- Thomas Berger, A&S graduate, author of Little Big Man
- Matt Berninger, lead vocalist and founder of band The National
- David Bernstein, architect
- Theodore Berry, graduate, mayor of Cincinnati 1972–76; member of Alpha Phi Alpha fraternity
- Michael Bierut, DAAP graduate, partner at Pentagram New York
- John Shaw Billings, M.D. 1860, began process to organize world's medical literature, now PubMed
- Eula Bingham, occupational health scientist
- Lee Bowman, graduate, actor in films such as Love Affair, Cover Girl and Bataan
- Barnett R. Brickner, rabbi
- Frank Brogan, chancellor of State University System of Florida; former president of Florida Atlantic University
- Henry T. Brown, chemical engineer; first African American to earn a BS degree in chemical engineering at the University of Cincinnati
- Robert Burck, "naked cowboy" of Times Square in New York City; NYC mayoral candidate
- Lindsey Burke, lawyer and politician
- Liz Callaway, singer and actress
- David Canary, A&S graduate, multiple Emmy-winning actor on All My Children since 1983
- Salmon P. Chase, 23rd Governor of Ohio, U.S. treasury secretary 1861–64, chief justice 1864-73
- Mike Clines, Kentucky politician
- Robin T. Cotton, ENT specialist and professor
- Dennis Courtney, aka Denis Beaulne, Broadway actor (Peter Pan, Starlight Express, director, choreographer
- Chase Crawford, actor and producer
- E. Jocob Crull, Montana politician and colonel, rival of Jennette Rankin (first female member of U.S. Congress)
- Cherien Dabis, filmmaker, screenwriter, The L Word, Amreeka
- David Daniels, singer
- Sujan Dasgupta, PhD in Mechanical Engineering, worked at Bell Labs; author, creator of Bengali detective Ekenbabu
- Charles G. Dawes, law graduate, 30th vice president of the United States, winner of Nobel Peace Prize
- Scott Devendorf, bass guitarist, founder of band The National
- Jonathan Dever, former member of Ohio House of Representatives
- Vinod Dham, graduate, "father" of Pentium computer chip (MS Eng, 77)
- John Price Durbin, chaplain of the Senate, president of Dickinson College
- Jennifer Eberhardt, social psychologist, MacArthur Fellow
- Randy Edelman, music graduate, composer of movie scores, received BMI's Outstanding Career Achievement Award
- Margaret Elizabeth Egan, librarian and communication scholar
- Bess Marie Eversull, first woman to earn a PhD in mathematics from the University of Cincinnati
- Suzanne Farrell, prima ballerina, recipient of Kennedy Center Honors and Presidential Medal of Freedom
- Hattie V. Feger, professor of education at Clark Atlanta University, 1931–1944
- Abraham J. Feldman (1893–1977), rabbi
- Morris M. Feuerlicht, rabbi
- Stephen Flaherty, music graduate, Tony-winning composer (Ragtime, Once on This Island)
- Frederick W. Franz, Jehovah's Witness, president of Watchtower Society
- William S. Friedman, rabbi
- Paul Gilger, architecture graduate, architect, conceived Jerry Herman musical revue Showtune, designed Industrial Light & Magic film studio for George Lucas
- Samuel H. Goldenson, rabbi
- Leon Goldman, pioneer in laser medicine
- Alexander D. Goode, one of Four Chaplains
- Michael Graves, architecture graduate, architect
- Moses J. Gries, rabbi
- Louis Grossmann, rabbi
- Michael Gruber, stage actor, singer, and dancer
- Adolf Guttmacher, rabbi
- Beth Gylys, poet and professor
- Victor H. Haas, first director of NIAID
- Albert Hague, music graduate, composer of score for How the Grinch Stole Christmas, won nine Tony Awards for Redhead in 1959
- Victor W. Hall, U.S. Navy rear admiral
- Hollis Hammonds, artist and academic
- Earl Hamner, graduate, writer, creator of The Waltons
- Walt Handelsman, A&S graduate, Pulitzer Prize-winning political cartoonist
- Dorian Harewood, drama graduate, film and television actor, voice artist
- Randy Harrison, drama graduate, actor, Queer as Folk
- Mary Hecht, BA 1952, American-born Canadian sculptor
- James G. Heller, rabbi and composer
- Maximilian Heller, rabbi
- Bob Herbold, former Microsoft COO
- Louise McCarren Herring, engineering graduate, pioneer of non-profit cooperative credit union movement
- Al Hirt, trumpeter and bandleader
- Ronald Howes, inventor of Easy-Bake Oven
- Sarah Hutchings, composer
- Bruce Edwards Ivins, microbiologist; key suspect in 2001 anthrax terror attacks, leaving five people dead
- Ali Jarbawi, Palestinian politician and academic
- James Kaiser, electrical engineer who developed Kaiser window for digital signal processing, winner of IEEE Jack S. Kilby Signal Processing Medal
- Jerry Kathman, president and CEO of LPK
- Charles Keating, criminal (Keating Five scandal); virulent anti-pornography activist
- Robert Kistner, gynecologist
- Bradley M. Kuhn, M.S. 2001, software freedom activist
- James Michael Lafferty, division CEO in Procter and Gamble, Coca-Cola, and British American Tobacco; former CEO of Fine Hygienic Holding; Olympic track and field coach
- Sean Lahman, historian and sports writer
- Kenesaw Mountain Landis, federal judge and first commissioner of Major League Baseball
- William Lawrence, congressman, first vice president of American Red Cross
- Emil W. Leipziger, rabbi
- Christopher W. Lentz, U.S. Air Force brigadier general
- Charles S. Levi, rabbi
- Clifton H. Levy, rabbi
- Liang Sili, academician of Chinese Academy of Sciences
- Abraham Lubin, hazzan
- Charlie Luken, law graduate, politician and former mayor of Cincinnati
- Alexander Lyons, rabbi
- Judah Leon Magnes, rabbi, chancellor/president of the Hebrew University of Jerusalem 1925–1948
- Beverly Malone, nurse and president of American Nurses Association
- Steven L. Mandel, anesthesiologist
- Jack Manning, actor, stage director, acting teacher
- Markiplier, YouTube personality, director
- Marco Marsan, author
- Kevin McCollum, graduate, Tony-winning Broadway producer (Rent, Avenue Q, The Drowsy Chaperone)
- Guy McElroy (M.A. 1972), art historian and curator
- Martin A. Meyer, rabbi
- Gregory Mixon, (Ph.D. 1989), American historian
- Julian Morgenstern, rabbi, Hebrew Union College professor and president
- Lena Beatrice Morton, literary scholar
- Dylan Mulvaney, actress and social media personality
- Pamela Myers, musical theater graduate, Tony-nominated stage and screen actor
- Morris Newfield, rabbi
- Sandra Novack, author
- Michele Pawk, musical theater graduate, Tony-winning Broadway actress (Hollywood Arms, Cabaret)
- Archimedes Plutonium, (B.A. as Ludwig Hansen, 1972), notable Usenet personality
- Paul Polman, CEO of Unilever
- Jennie Porter, first black person to receive a Ph.D. from the University of Cincinnati and became the first black female public school principal in Cincinnati
- James B. Preston, neurophysiologist
- Augustus Price, nuclear scientist, first African American radar man in the U.S. Navy
- Faith Prince, musical theater graduate, Tony-winning Broadway actress (Guys and Dolls)
- Jacob S. Raisin, rabbi
- Max Raisin, rabbi
- Lee Roy Reams, musical theater graduate, Tony-nominated actor, dancer
- Michael E. Reynolds, champion of the "earthship" sustainable construction movement
- Abraham B. Rhine (1877–1941), rabbi
- Dennis L. Riley (born 1945), politician in New Jersey General Assembly, represented 4th Legislative District 1980–90
- Diana Maria Riva, drama graduate, screen actor
- Anne Mason Roberts (1910–1971), HUD official in the 1960s
- Michael Robinson, activist for civil right and human rights
- Mitch Rowland, Grammy award-winning songwriter and lead guitarist in Harry Styles' band
- Jerry Rubin, activist
- Harvey C. Russell Sr. (1883–1949), African American educator, and academic administrator
- Nipsey Russell, actor, comedian, game show panelist, Tin Man in film version of The Wiz
- Rajiv Satyal, comedian, host and speaker; named the university's radio-station-turned-media group "BearCast"
- Tobias Schanfarber, rabbi
- Linda Schele, art and education major, expert on Mayan inscriptions and hieroglyphics
- Jean Schmidt, congresswoman from Ohio, 2005–13
- Robert P. Schumaker, creator of AZFinText, a news-aware high-frequency stock prediction system
- Teddi Siddall, drama graduate, screen actor
- Abram Simon, rabbi
- Yvette Simpson, law graduate, 2011–2017 Cincinnati city councilwoman
- George Speri Sperti, inventor
- Joseph B. Strauss, engineering graduate, designed Golden Gate Bridge
- Thomas Szasz, psychiatrist and author of The Myth of Mental Illness
- Bob Taft, law graduate, 1999–2007 governor of Ohio
- William Howard Taft, law graduate, 27th president of the United States, Supreme Court chief justice
- Mary Lee Tate, painter, teacher
- Christian Tetzlaff, professional violinist
- Charles V. Theis, hydrogeologist; first geology PhD graduate of UC
- Paul Tibbets, pilot of B-29 plane that dropped atom bomb over Hiroshima
- Dwight Tillery, politician, former mayor of Cincinnati
- Gerald Bard Tjoflat, senior United States circuit judge of the U.S. Court of Appeals for the Eleventh Circuit
- Tom Tsuchiya, sculptor, most notable for the bronze plaques for the National Baseball Hall of Fame
- Tom Uttech, painter
- Anne Valente, novelist and short-story writer
- Rodney Van Johnson, education graduate, actor (soap opera Passions)
- Sigismund von Braun, German diplomat, older brother of Wernher von Braun
- David H. Waldeck, chemist
- Rhoza A. Walker, educator, writer, psychologist
- Chris Wanstrath, co-founder and former CEO of GitHub
- David J. Williams, Director of Architecture, musician
- Frank Lunsford Williams (1864–1953), head teacher and educator in St. Louis, businessman, community leader
- Clarence A. Winder, civic leader, mayor of Pasadena, California in 1950s
- Louis Wolsey, rabbi
- Perry Yaney, physicist
- George Zepin, rabbi
- Martin Zielonka, rabbi

=== Athletics ===
Hall of Famer Sandy Koufax

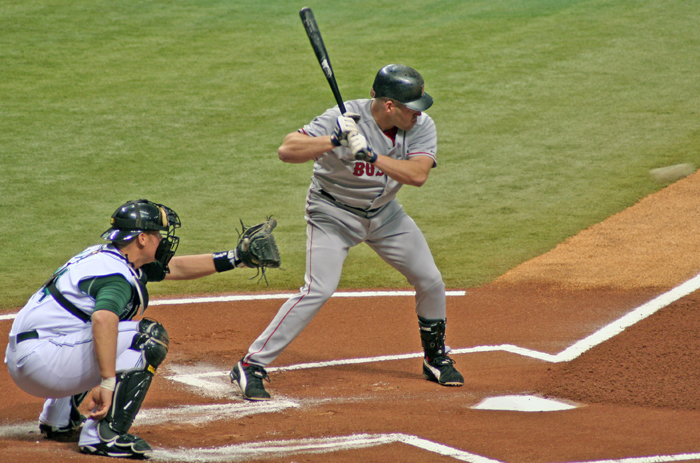
Kevin Youkilis

- Jim Ard, basketball player for 1976 NBA champion Boston Celtics, sixth overall selection of 1970 NBA draft
- Skeeter Barnes, Major League Baseball player for Cincinnati Reds, Montreal Expos, St. Louis Cardinals and Detroit Tigers
- Connor Barwin, NFL defensive end for Los Angeles Rams, selected 2nd round (46th overall) in 2009 NFL draft
- Bob Bell, NFL defensive end for Detroit Lions and St. Louis Cardinals
- Corie Blount, basketball player, Chicago Bulls, first round pick in 1993 NBA draft
- Ron Bonham, basketball player, 1962 NCAA champion with Cincinnati Bearcats, 2-time NBA champion with Boston Celtics
- Vaughn Booker, NFL defensive end for Kansas City Chiefs, Green Bay Packers and Cincinnati Bengals
- Jowon Briggs, NFL defensive tackle for Cleveland Browns
- Ed Brinkman, All-Star baseball player, Washington Senators and Detroit Tigers
- Tony Campana, MLB player for Chicago Cubs
- Jim Capuzzi, NFL defensive back and quarterback, played for Green Bay Packers
- Brent Celek, NFL tight end for Philadelphia Eagles, selected 5th round (162nd overall) in 2007 NFL draft, Super Bowl LII Champion
- Antonio Chatman, NFL wide receiver, played for Cincinnati Bengals and Green Bay Packers
- Trent Cole, NFL defensive end for Philadelphia Eagles 2005–14, selected 5th round (146th overall) in 2005 NFL draft
- Zach Collaros, CFL quarterback, 3-time Grey Cup champion (2012, 2019, 2021)
- Cris Collinsworth, law graduate, Emmy-winning sports commentator, NFL wide receiver
- Bryan Cook, NFL safety for Kansas City Chiefs, 2-time Super Bowl Champion (LVII, LVIII)
- Greg Cook, graduate, NFL quarterback for Cincinnati Bengals
- Pat Cummings, NBA player, New York Knicks, Milwaukee Bucks, Dallas Mavericks
- Ralph Davis, basketball player, 17th pick of 1960 NBA draft
- Zach Day, MLB pitcher
- David DeJulius (born 1999), basketball player for Maccabi Tel Aviv of the Israeli Basketball Premier League
- Connie Dierking, basketball player, fifth overall selection of 1958 NBA draft
- Annette Echikunwoke, hammer thrower, 2024 Olympic silver medalist
- Jacob Eisner (born 1947), Israeli basketball player
- Jason Fabini, NFL offensive tackle, New York Jets
- Nate Fish, baseball player and coach
- Danny Fortson, basketball player, 10th overall pick of 1997 NBA draft
- Rich Franklin, professional mixed martial artist, former UFC middleweight champion, V.P. of Asian MMA organization ONE Championship
- Andre Frazier, NFL linebacker, played for Cincinnati Bengals and Pittsburgh Steelers, 2-time Super Bowl Champion (XL, XLIII)
- Sauce Gardner, NFL cornerback, New York Jets, selected 1st round (4th overall) in 2022 NFL draft
- Yancy Gates (born 1989), basketball player for Ironi Nahariya of Israeli Premier League
- Antonio Gibson, USFL NFL safety, Philadelphia Stars and New Orleans Saints
- Vanessa Gilles, soccer player, 2020 Olympic gold medalist
- Mardy Gilyard, CFL wide receiver
- Marcellus Greene, NFL and Canadian Football League player
- Tyjuan Hagler, football linebacker for NFL's Indianapolis Colts
- Ian Happ, MLB player for Chicago Cubs
- Josh Harrison, MLB player for Pittsburgh Pirates
- Jim Herman, professional golfer, plays on the PGA tour, 3 professional wins
- Paul Hogue, basketball player, 2-time NCAA champion with Cincinnati Bearcats, 2nd overall pick of 1962 NBA draft
- Candice Holley, basketball player
- Jim Holstein, pro basketball player, college head coach
- Kevin Huber, NFL punter, played for Cincinnati Bengals
- Miller Huggins, Hall of Fame baseball player and manager; managed champion New York Yankees teams of 1920s
- George Jamison, NFL linebacker, played for Detroit Lions
- DerMarr Johnson, basketball player
- Lewis Johnson, graduate, track & field broadcaster
- Ed Jucker, basketball player, coach of Cincinnati Bearcats' 2-time national champions
- Rich Karlis, NFL placekicker, played for Denver Broncos
- Brendon Kay, football player
- Tinker Keck, NFL safety football player for New York Giants, XFL Super Bowl Champion football player
- Jason Kelce, NFL center for Philadelphia Eagles, Super Bowl LII Champion
- Travis Kelce, NFL tight end for Kansas City Chiefs, 3-time Super Bowl Champion (LIV, LVII, LVIII)
- Sean Kilpatrick (born 1990), NBA player for Chicago Bulls, and for Hapoel Jerusalem of the Israeli Basketball Super League
- Sandy Koufax, Hall of Fame baseball pitcher, 4-time World Series champion
- Steve Logan, basketball player
- Kenyon Martin, basketball player for New York Knicks, top pick in 2000 NBA draft
- Jason Maxiell, former NBA power forward, played for Detroit Pistons
- Urban Meyer, former head football coach for the Florida Gators and Ohio State Buckeyes; winner of the 2007, and 2009 BCS Championship with Florida and the 2014 CFP Championship with Ohio State
- Joe Morrison, NFL running back and wide receiver for New York Giants
- Haruki Nakamura, NFL safety for Baltimore Ravens, Carolina Panthers
- Elbie Nickel, NFL tight end, played for Pittsburgh Steelers
- Ray Nolting, NFL running back, played for Chicago Bears
- Jim O'Brien, NFL placekicker for Baltimore Colts, Super Bowl V champion
- Tom O'Malley, NFL quarterback, played for Green Bay Packers
- Brig Owens, NFL defensive back, played for Washington Redskins
- Ruben Patterson, NBA player, Portland Trail Blazers, Milwaukee Bucks
- David Payne, 110m hurdler, 2008 Olympic silver medalist
- Isaiah Pead, NFL running back, played for St. Louis Rams, Pittsburgh Steelers, and Miami Dolphins
- Tony Pike, NFL quarterback, played for Carolina Panthers
- Desmond Ridder, NFL quarterback for Arizona Cardinals
- Oscar Robertson, Hall of Fame basketball player, NBA champion and MVP
- Tom Rossley, former football head coach at SMU, offensive coordinator for Green Bay Packers
- Kelly Salchow, former Olympic rower (2004 and 2008 Olympic Games), women's quadruple sculls
- Kenny Satterfield, professional basketball player, 2001–12
- Kerry Schall, competed on reality show The Ultimate Fighter 2, professional MMA fighter
- Reckless Ben, slackliner and YouTuber
- Tyler Scott, NFL wide receiver for Chicago Bears
- Lance Stephenson, basketball player for Los Angeles Lakers
- Andrew Stewart, football player
- Clint Stickdorn, football player
- Bill Talbert, tennis player, 5-time U.S. Open champion, International Tennis Hall of Fame
- Tom Thacker, basketball player, NCAA and NBA champion, top pick of 1963 NBA draft
- Jordan Thompson, Olympic gold medalist volleyball player and member of the United States national team
- Tony Trabert, tennis player, Wimbledon and U.S. Open champion, International Tennis Hall of Fame
- Jack Twyman, basketball player, College Basketball Hall of Fame, 6-time NBA All-Star
- Brandon Underwood, NFL safety, Super Bowl XLV champion
- Nick Van Exel, basketball player, 1998 NBA All-Star
- LaDaris Vann, football player
- Roland West, basketball player
- James White, NBA guard/forward for New York Knicks, NBA champion
- Bob Wiesenhahn, basketball player, 1961 NCAA champion with Cincinnati Bearcats, 11th overall pick of 1961 NBA draft
- John Williams (born 2002), NFL guard, Green Bay Packers
- John Williamson (born 1986), basketball player for Maccabi Kiryat Gat B.C. of the Israeli Basketball Premier League
- Eric Wilson, football player
- Mary Wineberg, 2008 Olympic gold medalist, 4 × 400 m relay
- George Winn, NFL running back
- Derek Wolfe, NFL defensive end, Baltimore Ravens, Denver Broncos
- D. J. Woods, Canadian Football League wide receiver, Ottawa Redblacks
- Mike Woods, All-American and NFL player
- Tony Yates, basketball player for two-time national champion Cincinnati Bearcats, head coach 1983-89
- Kevin Youkilis, 3-time All-Star, Gold Glove winner, 2-time World Series champion, MLB player 2004–13
- Curtis Young, NFL defensive end, Green Bay Packers

== Notable faculty ==
- Neil Armstrong (until death), astronaut, professor of aerospace engineering
- Kamala Balakrishnan, immunologist, professor of transplantation medicine
- Carl Blegen, first scientific explorer of Troy
- W. Sean Davidson, biochemist and structural biologist
- Tanya Froehlich, pediatrician
- Karen L. Gould (born 1948), president of Brooklyn College
- Michael Griffith, author
- Kay Kinoshita, physicist
- Lee Ann Liska, hospital administrator
- Santa Ono, biomedical scientist, 28th president of University of Cincinnati, 15th president of University of British Columbia, 15th president of the University of Michigan
- Neil Rackham, author of Spin Selling
- George Rieveschl, inventor of diphenhydramine (Benadryl)
- Albert Sabin, developed the oral live polio vaccine
- Vernon L. Scarborough, Mesoamerican archaeologist, professor, and anthropology department head
- Herman Schnieder, father of co-operative education
- Donald Shell, inventor of Shell sort
- Gabriel P. Weisberg, art historian
- J. Richard Wuest, Pharmacist, Developed colored auxiliary labels
