= Kevin Youkilis =

American baseball player (born 1979)

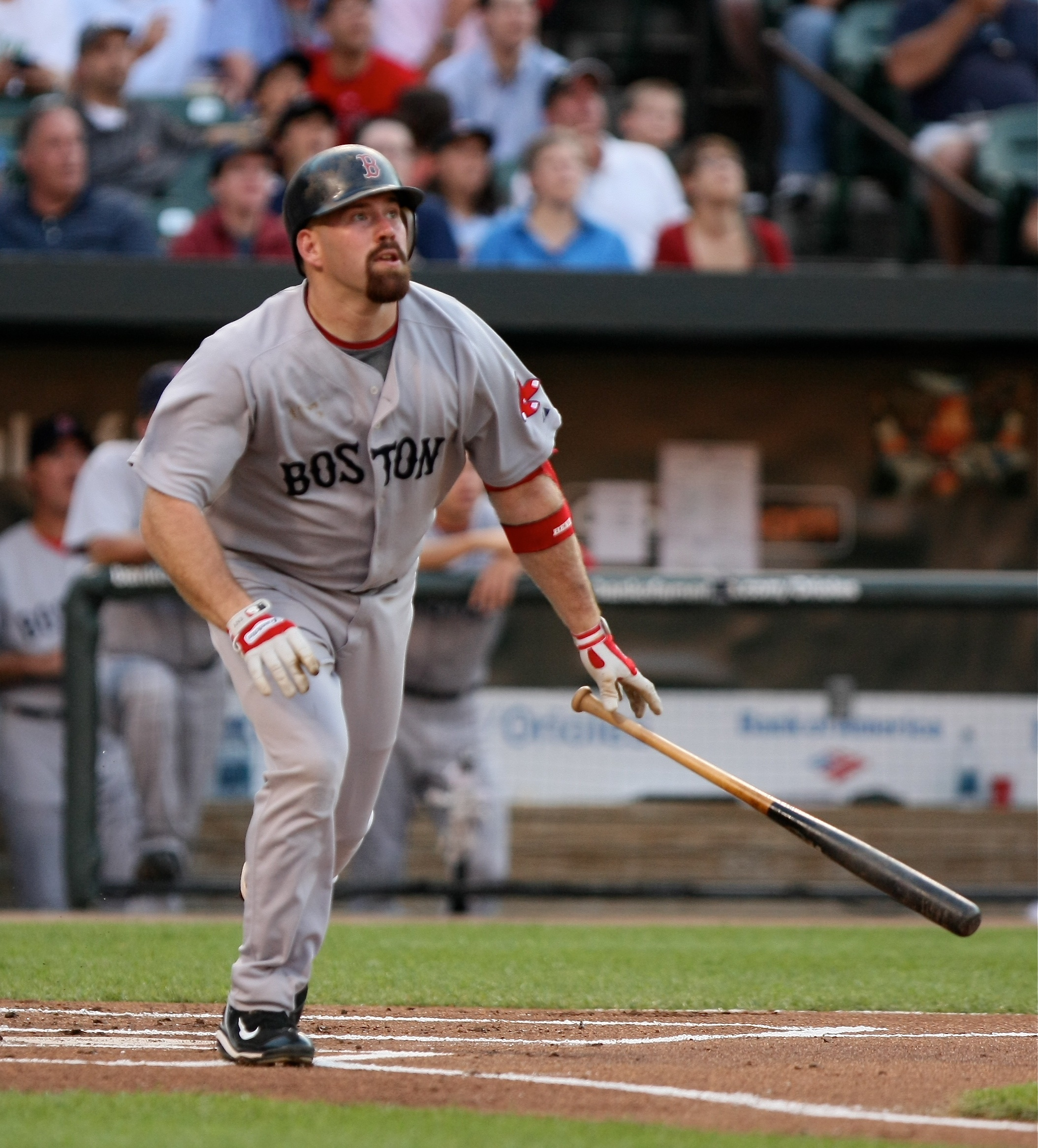
- Youkilis with the Boston Red Sox in 2009
- First baseman / Third baseman
- Born: March 15, 1979 (age 47); Cincinnati, Ohio, U.S.
- Batted: Right Threw: Right

Professional debut
- MLB: May 15, 2004, for the Boston Red Sox
- NPB: March 28, 2014, for the Tohoku Rakuten Golden Eagles

Last appearance
- MLB: June 13, 2013, for the New York Yankees
- NPB: April 26, 2014, for the Tohoku Rakuten Golden Eagles

MLB statistics
- Batting average: .281
- Home runs: 150
- Runs batted in: 618

NPB statistics
- Batting average: .215
- Home runs: 1
- Runs batted in: 11
- Stats at Baseball Reference

Teams
- Boston Red Sox (2004–2012); Chicago White Sox (2012); New York Yankees (2013); Tohoku Rakuten Golden Eagles (2014)

Career highlights and awards
- 3× All-Star (2008, 2009, 2011); 2× World Series champion (2004, 2007); Gold Glove Award (2007); AL Hank Aaron Award (2008); Boston Red Sox Hall of Fame

Kevin Edmund Youkilis (/ˈjuːkəlɪs/; born March 15, 1979), nicknamed "Youk" /ˈjuːk/, is an American former professional baseball first baseman and third baseman, who primarily played for the Boston Red Sox. A native of Cincinnati, Ohio, he was drafted by the Red Sox in 2001, after playing college baseball at the University of Cincinnati. He played in Major League Baseball (MLB) for the Red Sox, Chicago White Sox, and New York Yankees. He later served as a special assistant to Theo Epstein of the Chicago Cubs.

Known for his ability to get on base, while he was still a minor leaguer, Youkilis was nicknamed "Euclis: The Greek God of Walks" in the best-selling book, Moneyball: The Art of Winning an Unfair Game. A Gold Glove Award-winning first baseman, he once held baseball's record for most consecutive errorless games at first base (later broken by Casey Kotchman). He is also a three-time MLB All-Star, two-time World Series Champion, and winner of the 2008 Hank Aaron Award.

An intense performer on the playing field, Youkilis was known for his scrappiness, grittiness, dirt-stained jerseys, home-plate collisions, and his strange batting stance. He excelled despite a physique that led many observers to underestimate his athletic ability. He was called "roly-poly" by his high school coach, "pudgy" by his college coach, a "fat kid" by general manager Billy Beane, and a "thicker-bodied guy" by the Red Sox scout who recruited him. As Jackie MacMullan wrote for the Boston Globe: "He does not look like an MVP candidate; more a refrigerator repairman, a butcher, the man selling hammers behind the counter at the True Value hardware store." Youkilis was named to the Sporting News' list of the 50 greatest current players in baseball, ranking No. 36 on the list in 2009, No. 38 in 2010, and No. 35 in 2011.

Internationally, Youkilis has played for Team USA in the 2009 World Baseball Classic and served as the hitting coach for Team Israel under manager Ian Kinsler at the 2023 World Baseball Classic.

In 2021, Youkilis was a pregame and postgame analyst for Red Sox broadcasts on NESN. Starting in 2022, he became a color commentator during Red Sox games, working alongside Red Sox play-by-play announcer Dave O'Brien.

== Background and early life ==
Youkilis' Jewish great-great-great-grandfather, a native of 19th-century Romania, moved to Greece at the age of 16 to avoid conscription at the hands of the notoriously anti-Semitic Cossacks. He became homesick, however, and returned to Romania after a couple of years, although he changed his surname from "Weiner" to "Youkilis" to avoid conscription and imprisonment.

Youkilis was born in Cincinnati, the son of Carolyn (née Weekley) and Mike Youkilis, a wholesale jeweler. His father was born to a Jewish family, while his mother, a native of West Virginia, converted to Judaism after her marriage. Youkilis has described his father as a "well-known third baseman in the Jewish Community Center fast-pitch softball league."

Youkilis is Jewish and had a bar mitzvah at a Conservative synagogue. At the age of 15, he had an uncredited one-line speaking role in the romantic comedy film Milk Money.

He attended Sycamore High School (class of 1997) in the northeastern suburbs of Cincinnati, where he played third base, shortstop, first base, and the outfield for the school team (the Aviators) and Nuckols Baseball, which also had Aaron Cook as a pitcher, and won the Amateur Athletic Union National Championship in 1994. He was a four-year letter winner, a two-time All-Greater Miami Conference (1996 and 1997) and All-City (1996 and 1997) player, and All-State his senior season as he led the team with a .475 batting average and finished second all time in home runs. While at Sycamore High School, he was the only player to homer off his future Red Sox teammate Aaron Cook.

Youkilis was inducted into the Sycamore Athletic Hall of Fame in 2008. In 2017, the school honored him by retiring his jersey number, number 13.

== College ==
When he graduated from high school in 1997, Youkilis was 6 feet 1 inch (1.85 m) and weighed about 227 pounds (103 kg). He was recruited by two Division I schools: Butler University and his ultimate choice, the University of Cincinnati —an institution that was the alma mater of both his father and Youkilis' longtime idol, Sandy Koufax, and had just finished a 12–46 season. UC coach Brian Cleary spotted Youkilis at a winter camp. "I looked at him and said, Well, we need somebody", said Cleary. "I'd love to tell you I saw something no one else did, but he was just better than what we had."

While majoring in finance, Youkilis excelled as a player for the Cincinnati Bearcats from 1998 to 2001. "I take no credit", said Cleary. "He coaches himself. He knows his swing. Any time we said anything to him, he was already a step ahead. He made the adjustments he had to make. I just think he's a really smart guy who had a great feel for what he had to do." In his junior year in 2000, he was a second-team All-American and first-team All-Conference USA, as he set school records by hitting three home runs in one game and 19 for the season, and drawing 63 walks in 60 games; still, he went undrafted. "He was kind of a square-shaped body, a guy [who] in a uniform didn't look all that athletic", Cleary said. "He wasn't a tall, prospect-y looking guy. He looked chubby in a uniform. … It wasn't fat. He was strong. [But] I think the body did scare some people away."

During the period between his junior and senior years, he played in the Cape Cod League for the Bourne Braves, where he was named a league all-star, and finished sixth in the league in batting average. In his senior year in 2001, he repeated as second-team All-American. He set UC career records for home runs (56), walks (206), slugging percentage (.627), and on-base percentage (.499) with a batting average of .366. "He had a great eye … he hardly ever struck out looking", said Brad Meador, UC's associate head coach. "When he did, you knew the ump missed the call." Cleary, noting how driven Youkilis was to succeed, told his father: "Your son's going to be a millionaire some day. I don't know if it's in baseball, but he's going to make some money one of these days."

Yet, when asked what he liked about Youkilis, former Boston scout Matt Haas said: "At first glance, not a lot. He was unorthodox. He had an extreme crouch—his thighs were almost parallel to the ground. And he was heavier than he is now. But the more I watched him, the more I just thought, 'Throw the tools out the window. This guy can play baseball.'"

In 2001, at Haas' urging, the Boston Red Sox drafted Youkilis in the eighth round (243rd overall), to the chagrin of Billy Beane, who had hoped that he would be able to draft him in a later round. ESPN reported that: "questions about his defense and power with wood kept him out of the top part of the draft." He signed for a mere $12,000 signing bonus. "Kevin would have played for a six-pack of beer", his father said.

"Teams didn’t appreciate performance as much then as they do now", observed Red Sox VP of Player Personnel Ben Cherington eight years later. "His college performance was off the charts. If he [were] in the draft this year, he'd be at least a sandwich pick, if not a first rounder. His performance was that good, in college and on the Cape. Now, teams appreciate what that means. There's no way he’d last that long now."

In 2007, he was inducted into the University of Cincinnati James P. Kelly Athletics Hall Of Fame. In 2015, the University of Cincinnati retired his No. 36 jersey number.

In 2018, Youkilis took his final exams and graduated the University of Cincinnati with a business degree.

In 2019, he was named to the inaugural Conference USA Hall of Fame class.

== Minor leagues (2001–2004) ==
In 2001, Youkilis made his professional debut as a third baseman with the Lowell Spinners, a Short-Season A Class franchise in the New York–Penn League. He went on to lead the league with a .512 OBP, 52 runs, and 70 walks (against just 28 strikeouts), while hitting for a .317 batting average (third in the league) in 59 games. He also reached base safely by hit or walk in 46 consecutive games (the third-longest such streak in the minor leagues). Peter Gammons wrote that August: "Remember this name: Kevin Youkilis, who resembles Steve Balboni." Honored by the Spinners with a "Youkilis bobblehead night", Youkilis said: "It's an honor—you know you've made it when you get a bobblehead of yourself." Promoted from Lowell towards the end of the season, he played five games with the Augusta GreenJackets of the South Atlantic League, a Low-A Class league. He was named Red Sox Minor League Player of the Year.

In 2002, Youkilis appeared in 15 games for Augusta, in 76 games for the Sarasota Sox (40 of them at first base), and in 44 games for the Trenton Thunder. He hit .310, with eight home runs and 80 RBI for the year, and he was voted Trenton's "Player of the Year." His .436 on-base percentage was the fifth-highest in the minors in 2002, and his 80 walks were seventh-most. In recognition of his performance, the Boston Red Sox named Youkilis their 2002 Minor League Player of the Year.

After the 2002 season, Boston's then-assistant general manager, Theo Epstein, sent Youkilis to the Athletes' Performance Institute in Tempe, Arizona, where he engaged in an intensive six-week training regimen. Youkilis then moved his off-season home to Arizona, and attended the Institute in the 2004–08 off seasons as well.

In 2003, Youkilis started the season with the Portland Sea Dogs. In 94 games, he led the Eastern League with a .487 on-base percentage (best all-time for the team through 2007), and was third in the league with a .327 batting average (second-best all-time for the team through 2007). 86 walks (against just 40 strikeouts), and a .953 OPS, and tied for third with 16 hit by pitch. Later, he earned a spot on the Eastern League All-Star team, the Baseball America AA All-Star team, and on the U.S. roster for the 2003 All-Star Futures Game. After Portland, Youkilis moved up to play for the Pawtucket Red Sox, the Boston Red Sox Class-AAA franchise. During his time with Pawtucket, Youkilis managed to complete a streak he started while in Portland: he reached base in 71 consecutive games, tying future teammate Kevin Millar's minor-league record for consecutive games reaching base. His 104 walks were the third-highest number recorded in the minors in 2003. Asked, however, about the focus in position-playing baseball on five-tool players, Youkilis quipped, "I don't even know if I have a tool."

Writing for ESPN, John Sickels evaluated him as follows in mid-2003:

Youkilis is an on-base machine. He never swings at a bad pitch, and is adept at working counts and out-thinking the pitcher. Unlike some guys who draw lots of walks, Youkilis seldom strikes out. He makes solid contact against both fastballs and breaking pitches. Youkilis' swing is tailored for the line drive, and he may never hit for much home run power. But he hits balls to the gaps effectively, and could develop 10–14 home run power down the road. Youkilis does not have very good speed, though he is a decent baserunner. His defense at third base draws mixed reviews. His arm, range, and hands all rate as adequate/average. He doesn't kill the defense at third base, but he doesn't help it much, either, and is likely to end up at first base down the road.

Youkilis spent the 2003–04 winter in Mexico, playing for Navojoa of the Mexican Pacific League. In 2004, he appeared in 32 games for Pawtucket, hitting .258 with three home runs, and a .347 on-base percentage, before being called up to the Red Sox on May 15.

In his minor league career through 2005, he batted .299 with a .442 OBP while playing 340 games at third base, 59 at first base, and two at second base.

== Major leagues (2004–2014) ==
=== Boston Red Sox ===
==== 2004 ====
"Sometimes this is more than a game. It's life, here in Boston."

— Youkilis, on the dedication of the Red Sox fans

On May 15, 2004, Youkilis was called up for the first time. "I didn't sleep much", Youkilis said. "I got about four hours of sleep. … They told me the night before I was playing.... I got in there, and man, I was just amped up and excited." During his first major-league game in Toronto, with his parents watching from the second row behind the dugout, Youkilis (in his second at bat) homered against 1996 Cy Young Award winner Pat Hentgen, becoming just the seventh player in team history to hit a home run in his first game. As a prank, the team initially gave Youkilis the silent treatment when he returned to the dugout after his homer. "This one will go down probably as the greatest day of my life", he said.

Later, Youkilis was swept up in the team's ritual annual hazing, in which he and other rookies were made to wear skimpy Hooters waitress outfits, orange satin shorts and tight, clingy white tank tops, for the team trip from Canada through US Customs in Florida. "I walked into the locker room, and all my clothes were gone", Youkilis said. "There was just a Hooters outfit and shoes." When Red Sox regular starting third baseman Bill Mueller was placed on the disabled list, Youkilis became the everyday third baseman until Mueller returned on July 2 and was named the American League (AL) Rookie of the Month for May, after leading AL rookies with nine walks and a .446 OBP as he batted .318 with 7 RBI, and 15 runs in 13 games. Noting ways that his life had suddenly changed, he said: "I'm staying in the best hotel I've ever stayed in, and my paycheck has quadrupled." In mid-July, he was sent back down to AAA, however, to make room for Ramiro Mendoza, though he was brought up again towards the end of the month.

On September 24, which was Yom Kippur, Youkilis appeared in the dugout in uniform, but declined to participate in the game out of deference to the religious holiday. Youkilis was named the club's Rookie of the Year by the Boston chapter of the Baseball Writers' Association of America. For the season, in 44 games, he saw an average of 4.67 pitches per plate appearance, first among major leaguers with at least 90 plate appearances. As Youkilis observed, "Fighting off pitches, fouling off pitches, laying off pitches, making it so the opposing pitcher can't breathe; that's my job." He was on the roster for the Red Sox for the 2004 American League Division Series (ALDS), making his sole appearance in Game 2 against the Anaheim Angels. "It's been an unbelievable ride", Youkilis said. "It's a great first year, a year you probably can't top. Hopefully, it ends like a Cinderella story." He was removed from the roster for the next round, the American League Championship Series (ALCS), and was on the roster but did not play in the World Series.

==== 2005 ====
While virtually nobody else knew it, Youkilis broke his toe during spring training in 2005, and was back playing again in a matter of days. It was "in Vero Beach", Youkilis said. "I was trying to make the team."

On the Red Sox Opening Day roster for the first time in his career in 2005, Youkilis found himself on the way back down to Pawtucket on April 13 as the team needed to activate Curt Schilling, and Youkilis happened to still have minor league options; but told that he would be back, Youkilis decided to keep his Boston apartment and commute to Pawtucket. Up and down all season as the Red Sox made use of his options, he got a call-up—prompted by Bill Mueller having back spasms in batting practice—one August day as he was in Pawtucket's clubhouse before a game. Without changing out of the same white pants that he wore for both Boston and Pawtucket home games, he packed his car, drove the 40 miles (64 km) to Boston, walked into the Red Sox clubhouse, changed his jersey and cleats, and was ready to play.

He ultimately played 43 more games for Pawtucket in 2005 before being called up permanently. On September 18, he fractured the tip of the ring finger of his right hand fielding a ground ball, and did not play again until October 2, the final day of the regular season. In 2005 with Boston, Youkilis hit .278 with a .400 on-base percentage in 79 at-bats in 44 games during five stints with the team. He saw an average of 4.68 pitches per plate appearance, the most of any Red Sox player with at least 50 at-bats. He made 23 appearances at third base, nine at first base, and two at second, and batted at least once from all nine spots in the batting order.

==== 2006 ====
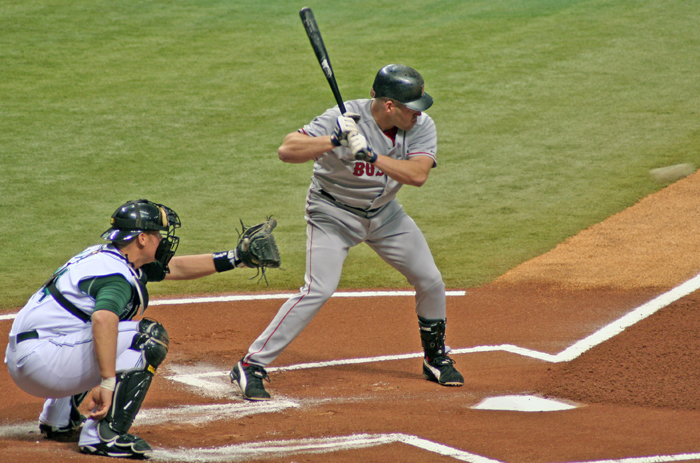
Youkilis batting against the Tampa Bay Devil Rays in April 2006

In 2006, his first full season in the majors, Youkilis became a regular first baseman (with 127 games at first). Until that time, he was primarily a third baseman, though he did play nine games at first base with the Red Sox in 2005, and 56 games at first base in his minor league career. Also in 2006 he played in the outfield for the first time in his professional career, 18 games in left field. Despite his inexperience in the outfield, Youkilis did not commit an error while in the outfield; he did, however, commit eight errors while playing the infield.

Youkilis tied for the major league lead in sacrifice flies (11), and led the AL with 4.43 pitches per plate appearance and by hitting line drives 24% of time that he put balls in play. Also that year, Youkilis finished second in the AL in pitches seen (3,009) and percent of pitches taken (63.8), 4th in OBP with runners in scoring position with two outs (.524), 7th in bases on balls (91; the six players ahead of him averaged 41 home runs and 14 intentional walks, while Youkilis hit only 13 homers and was not intentionally walked once), tied for 7th in "bases taken" (22; advanced on fly balls, passed balls, wild pitches, balks, etc.), 8th in doubles (42) and batting average with runners in scoring position with two out (.375), 9th in walk percentage (13.8%), and 10th in times on base (259). He scored 100 runs, hit for a .325 batting average with runners in scoring position, and hit four first inning leadoff home runs. He did this despite struggling in the second half of the season with plantar fasciitis and a problematic abdominal muscle.

==== 2007 ====
Youkilis had a career-high 23-game hitting streak starting on May 5, 2007, and ending on June 2, 2007, in which he hit .426 (43–for–101) with 13 doubles, six home runs, 21 RBI, and a .468 OBP. At one point during the hitting streak, he had nine straight games with at least two hits (tying a Red Sox record set by Jim Rice in 1978), and became the first Red Sox hitter since Trot Nixon to hit an inside-the-park home run. During the hitting streak, on May 20, he hit what would be the shortest homer by a Sox player during the season—a 321-foot homer around the Pesky Pole. The home run would not have cleared the fence at any of the other 29 ballparks in baseball. Although the hit streak ended on June 2, he did walk three times in an 11–6 win over the Yankees.

His manager Terry Francona said, "He's taking more of what the pitchers give him, using the whole field. He's going to work the count about as good as any hitter in baseball. Last year if he got a two-strike breaking ball, he might swing and miss. This year he's fouling it off, or taking it to right field."

On June 1, Yankees pitcher Scott Proctor hit Youkilis in the head with a pitch; Proctor was ejected from the game. On August 30, Yankees pitcher Joba Chamberlain threw a pair of 98 mph pitches over Youkilis's head; Chamberlain was ejected, and later also suspended two games for "inappropriate actions." "That's the second time", Youkilis observed. "Scott Proctor hit me in the head. Coincidence? I don't know. It doesn't look good."

On June 25, 2007, Youkilis played in his 120th consecutive game at first base without an error, breaking the prior Red Sox record set in 1921 by Stuffy McInnis. On September 7, he played in his 179th consecutive game at first base without an error, which broke the prior AL record set in 1973 by Mike Hegan.

On September 15, Yankees pitcher Chien-Ming Wang struck Youkilis on his right wrist with a pitch, resulting in a deep tendon bruise that kept him out until September 25, when he returned with the aid of a cortisone shot. In 2007, Youkilis was sixth in the AL with 15 hit by pitch (HBP).

Youkilis's error-less streak at the end of the regular season was 190 games; while he was charged with an error in the sixth inning of an October 16, 2007, playoff game against the Cleveland Indians, postseason games are not included in the record. Youkilis said, "I'm not worried about making the error. I'm worried about trying to help the team win and trying to get an out any way we can." Leading the league with a perfect 1.000 fielding percentage, and an AL-record 1,079 error-less chances at first, Youkilis won the 2007 AL Gold Glove award for first basemen.

While he batted .288 for the season, with men on base, he hit .340 with a .435 OBP. He was 6th in the league in pitches per plate appearance (4.27) and in hit by pitch (15).

In the first inning of Game 1 of the ALDS against the Angels he hit his first post-season home run. It was his first homer since returning from being hit by Wang, and Youkilis said his wrist "felt a lot better as the days have progressed. I think the best thing about it is that it's playoff time, and adrenaline helps the most." In the 7-game ALCS against the Indians he hit three more home runs, had 14 hits (tying the LCS record jointly held by Hideki Matsui and Albert Pujols since 2004), and scored 10 runs (bettering Matsui's 2004 ALCS record) while batting .500 (another new ALCS record, bettering Bob Boone's .455 in 1986) with a .576 OBP and a .929 slugging percentage.

Still, in the World Series against Colorado, he did not start the team's away games. Francona faced a dilemma when playing without a DH in the NL park of having to bench either Youkilis, 120-RBI man Mike Lowell, or 117-RBI man David Ortiz, as he had to choose from among them which two would play first base and third base. Bob Ryan of The Boston Globe called it "the most difficult decision any American League manager has had to make in the 34-year history of the DH". Youkilis said, "It doesn't bother me. I want to play, but I totally understand the situation. Look, I'm doing everything I've always wanted to do. I'm playing in a World Series. I'm playing every day. I'm happy. I just want to win.... If I have to take a seat, that's just the way it has to be." Youkilis hit two doubles (both in Game 1) and had three walks in only 12 plate appearances in the 4-game win over Colorado, as he was not in the starting lineup for the away games. Dismissing questions as to whether he was upset about being benched for the last two games of the World Series, Youkilis said, "Move on and go to another team if you’re worried about your playing time, and think you deserve to play over somebody else."

Youkilis was selected the 2007 recipient of the Jackie Jensen Award for spirit and determination by the Boston BBWAA chapter.

==== 2008 ====
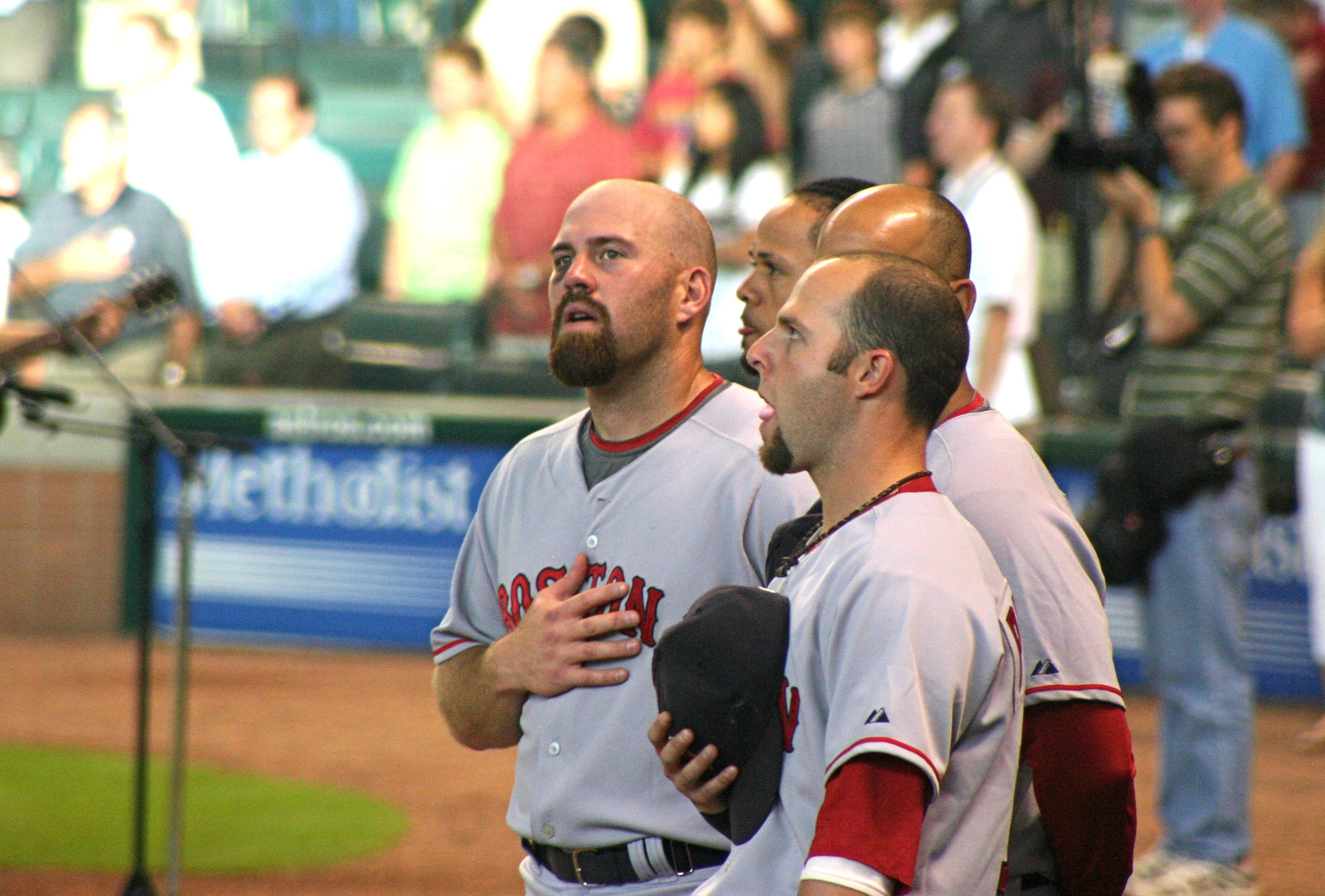
Youkilis (left) in Houston with then-teammate Dustin Pedroia, June 2008

In 2007, Youkilis had earned $424,500, the fourth-lowest salary on the club. In February 2008, he signed a one-year contract for $3 million, avoiding salary arbitration. In March 2008, his role as the designated player representative of the Red Sox became known during the resolution of a player-management dispute regarding non-payment of coaches and staff for the Red Sox trip to Japan.

On April 2, 2008, on an unassisted game-ending play against the Oakland A's, Youkilis broke the Major League record for most consecutive error-less games by a first baseman, previously held by Steve Garvey, at 194 games. In his 205th game without an error on April 27, Youkilis also established a new major league record for first basemen, when he fielded his 1,701st consecutive chance without an error, passing the old mark of 1,700 set by Stuffy McInnis from 1921 to 1922. His streak, which started on July 4, 2006, was snapped at 238 games (2,002 fielding attempts) on June 7, 2008, against the Seattle Mariners.

He was named AL Player of the Week for May 5–11, after batting .375 while leading the AL with five home runs, and tying for the American League lead with 10 RBI.

In an early June game at Fenway Park, one camera reportedly showed Manny Ramirez taking a swing at Youkilis, and the two had to be separated by teammates in the Red Sox dugout. "I think they were just exchanging some views on things", manager Terry Francona said. "We had a lot of testosterone going tonight." Asked about the incident the following year, Youkilis said: "We have two different approaches to the game. Winning and losing isn’t life and death to Manny."

He was the AL's starter at first base on the 2008 AL All-Star team that played the 79th Major League Baseball All-Star Game at Yankee Stadium, voted in by the fans with 2,858,130 votes in his first year on the ballot. Youkilis became the sixth Red Sox first baseman to start an All-Star Game at first base, following Jimmie Foxx (1938; 40), Walt Dropo (1950), Mickey Vernon (1956), George Scott (1966), and Mo Vaughn (1996).

In late July, Manny Ramirez was traded away by the Red Sox. Youkilis took over the cleanup spot of the lineup.

In 2008, Youkilis led the AL in at bats per RBI (4.7), was third in slugging percentage (.569) and sacrifice flies (9), fourth in RBI (115), extra base hits (76), and OPS (.958); fifth in hit by pitch (12); sixth in batting average (.312) and on-base percentage (.390); seventh in doubles (43) and in times advanced from first to third on a single (14); eighth in total bases (306), 10th in at-bats per home run (18.6), and 12th in home runs (29). He was also second in extra base hit percentage (12.2% of all plate appearances) and tied for seventh in times advanced from first to third on a single (14).

Youkilis also batted .356 against relief pitchers, .358 with men on base, and .374 with runners in scoring position. He drew seven intentional walks during the 2008 season, the first season he had garnered any, and also led the AL with a .353 batting average after the sixth inning.

Youkilis finished third in the balloting for the 2008 AL MVP Award, receiving two first-place votes (one from Evan Grant of The Dallas Morning News), while his teammate Dustin Pedroia won and Justin Morneau came in second. Only Youkilis and Morneau were named on all ballots.

In the ALCS Game 5 vs. the Tampa Bay Rays, the Red Sox were down by seven runs in the bottom of the seventh inning. Youkilis scored the winning run for the Red Sox to complete the second-largest comeback in MLB postseason history. Before Game 4 of the 2008 World Series, he was named the winner of the AL Hank Aaron Award for the best offensive performance of the 2008 season.

==== 2009 ====
Youkilis signed a four-year, $41.25 million contract with the Red Sox on January 15, 2009. The deal also included a team option (at $14 million, with a $1.25 million buyout) for 2013. Later that year, he was voted #36 on the Sporting News list of the 50 greatest active baseball players, voted on by a panel that included members of the Baseball Hall of Fame.

Youkilis batted cleanup for Team USA in the 2009 World Baseball Classic, tying for the lead among all WBC players in home runs (3) and runs (9), and tying for second on the team in RBIs (6) and walks (6), through the first two rounds. He had to leave the team with a left ankle sprain, however, before the WBC semifinals.

Youkilis hit a walk off home run against the Yankees on April 24, 2009. "He has skills, man", said David Ortiz. "I don't know how he do it. He just do it." He was subsequently placed on the disabled list a few days later, but returned to play on May 20. "It's frustrating not being able to play", he said. "Watching baseball is not something I like to do."

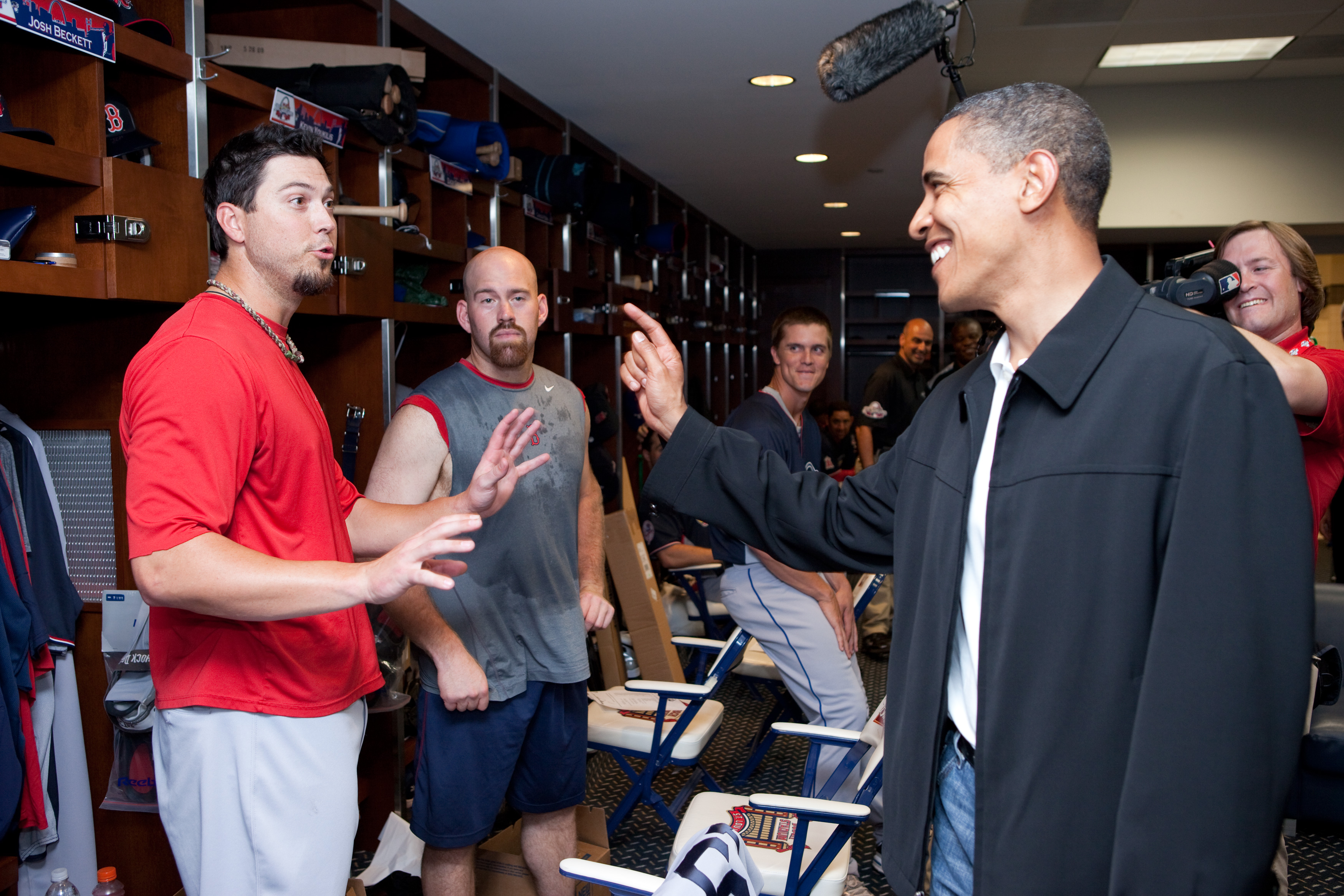
Youkilis (center), Josh Beckett (left), and Barack Obama before the start of the Major League Baseball All-Star Game, July 2009

Youkilis was picked to be a reserve on the AL 2009 All-Star team by Tampa Bay and AL manager Joe Maddon, after coming in second in the fan vote to Mark Teixeira, 3,309,050–3,069,906.

On August 6, 2009, with the Red Sox suffering numerous injuries, Youkilis played left field for the first time since he played 18 games there in 2006. On August 8, he again played left field, and made a couple of twists and turns on a fly ball hit by Johnny Damon before committing an error.

On August 11, 2009, after 6' 5" pitcher Rick Porcello of the Detroit Tigers hit him in the back with an 89 mph pitch, Youkilis immediately charged Porcello on the mound. Youkilis threw his helmet at the fast back-pedaling Porcello, and Porcello tackled Youkilis, both went down, and both benches cleared. Both players were tossed from the game, and each received a five-game suspension.

Hearing that his friend and former minor league teammate Greg Montalbano had died of testicular cancer at the age of 31 late on August 21, Youkilis dedicated his next game to his friend's memory. After inscribing "GM" in marker on his cap, he hit two home runs in the game against the Yankees, while driving in six runs. Both times as he crossed home plate, he looked up and pointed to the sky. "That was for him", Youkilis said. "There are some crazy things that have happened in my life. You … feel like there's somebody out there somewhere pushing balls out for you, and doing great things."

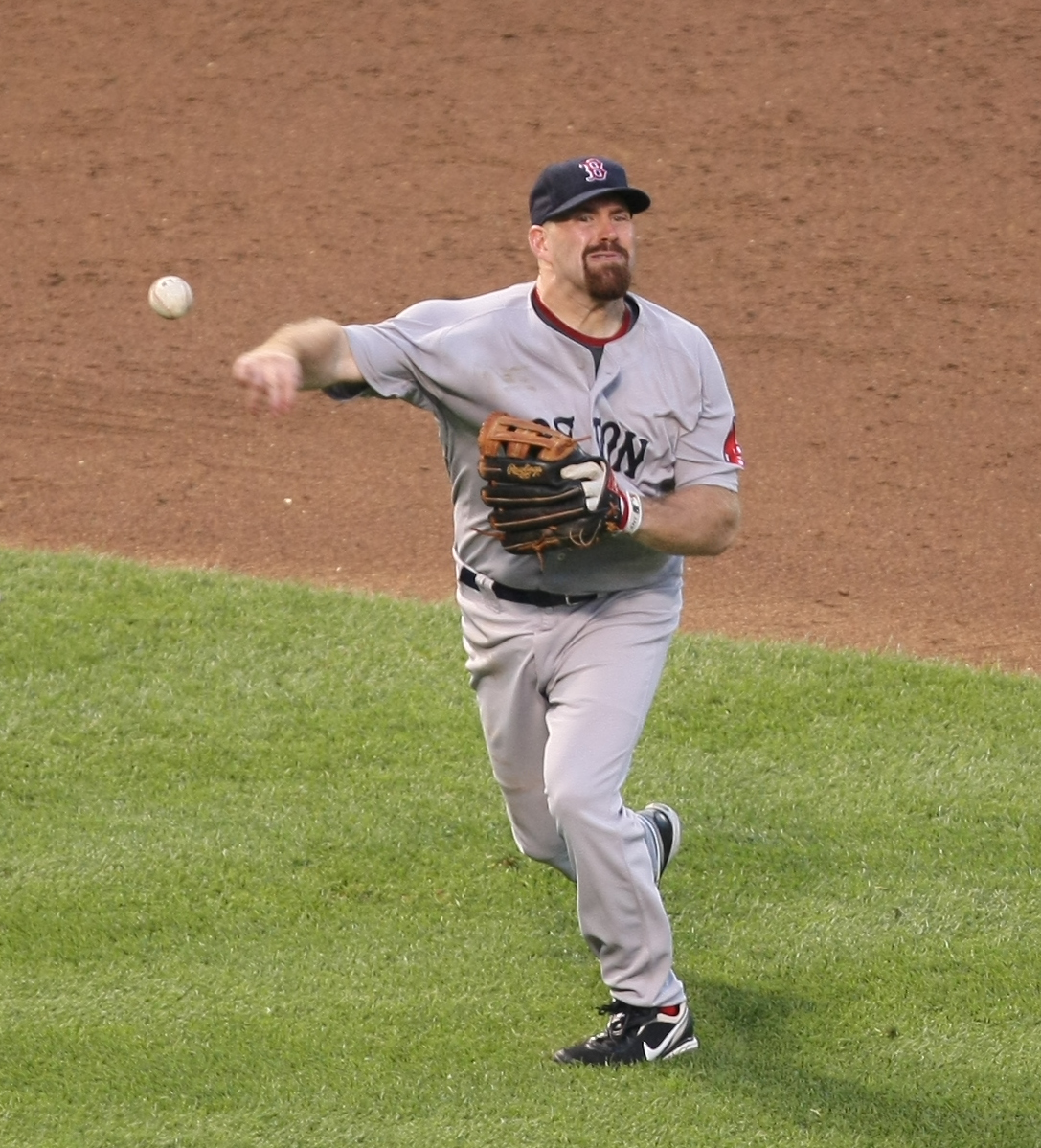
Youkilis with the Red Sox in 2009

In 2009, Youkilis was second in the AL in OBP (.413) and OPS (.961), fourth in hit by pitch (16), fifth in slugging percentage (.548), and batted .305 overall and .362 with runners in scoring position. He also led the AL in pitches per plate appearance (4.42), was sixth in batting average on balls in play (.363), and 10th in walk percentage (13.6%). "Statistically, if you consider 2008 and 2009, you could make the case there has been no better player in the league [in that time]", said Red Sox EVP Epstein. Of the players with 1,000 plate appearances in the AL over the 2008–09 seasons, none had a higher OPS than Youkilis (.960).

In the field, while Youkilis split his time primarily between first base and third base and therefore did not qualify for the fielding percentage title at either, his .998 fielding percentage in 78 games at first matched that of the league leader Lyle Overbay, and his .974 fielding percentage in 63 games at third base was better than league-leader Melvin Mora's .971.

Youkilis finished sixth in balloting for the 2009 AL MVP Award, receiving two second-place votes. He was selected as the Red Sox most valuable player (winner of the 2009 Thomas A. Yawkey Memorial Award) in voting by the Boston Chapter of the Baseball Writers' Association of America.

==== 2010 ====
In 2010, Youkilis was again named to Sporting News' list of the 50 greatest current players in baseball, ranking No. 38 on the list. A panel of 21 MLB executives was polled to arrive at the list.

On May 18, 2010, Youkilis hit his 100th career home run off CC Sabathia.

On August 2, Youkilis' season was cut short by a right thumb abductor muscle tear, which he had played through for two weeks. At the time of his injury, he was tied for 3rd in the major leagues in runs scored (77), and led all major leaguers with a .798 slugging percentage against left-handed pitchers. He was 3rd in the AL in on-base percentage (.411), tied for 5th in walks (58), tied for 7th in extra-base hits (50), 8th in slugging percentage (.564), and 9th in total bases (204). He had surgery to repair the tear on August 6.

The injury limited him to only 102 games for the season, his fewest since his 2005 sophomore year. Slowed by his injury, he had only 362 at-bats, but batted .307/.411/.564 with 19 home runs and 62 RBI. For the years 2008–10, his .964 OPS ranked second in the major leagues, behind Albert Pujols (1.074).

==== 2011 ====
During the offseason the Red Sox acquired All-Star first baseman Adrián González, and with the imminent departure of Adrián Beltré, Youkilis agreed to the make the switch back to third base.

In 2011, Youkilis was again named to Sporting News' list of the 50 greatest current players in baseball, ranking No. 35 on the list. A panel of 21 MLB executives was polled to arrive at the list.

Youkilis was named a reserve for the 82nd All-Star Game. At the All-Star break, he was third in the league in doubles (26), fourth in on-base percentage (.399), sixth in RBIs (63), seventh in OPS (.911), and ninth in walks (49). For the season, he led all AL third basemen in fielding percentage, at .967. However, he batted only .258, his lowest MLB season average of his career.

The Red Sox suffered a collapse late in the 2011 season, losing their playoff positioning. A source among the Red Sox claimed that Josh Beckett, Jon Lester, and John Lackey spent games they did not pitch in the clubhouse eating fried chicken and drinking beer; some Red Sox teammates speculated that Youkilis was the source of this information, alienating him from his teammates.

==== 2012 ====
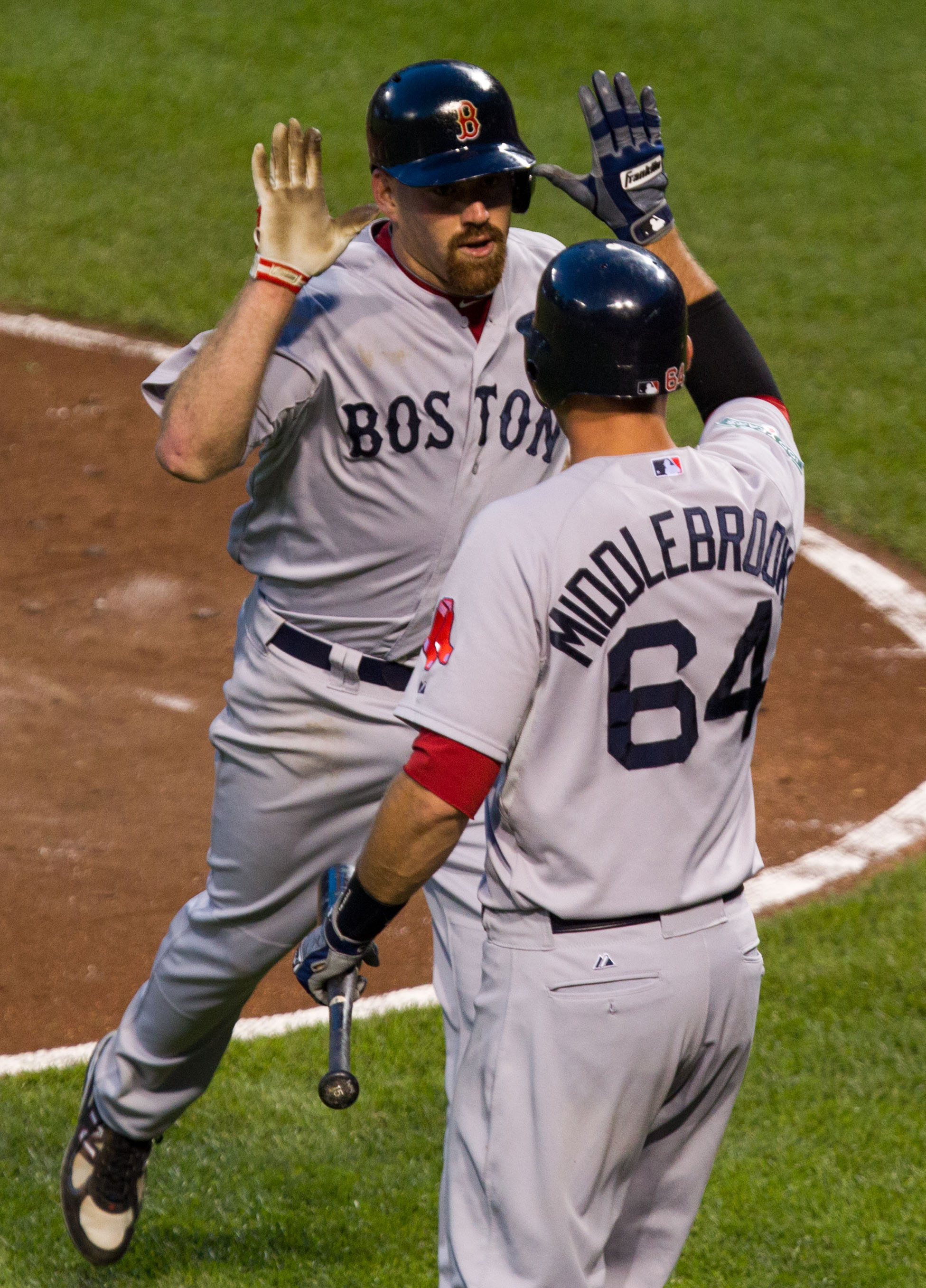
Youkilis being congratulated by Will Middlebrooks

On April 15, 2012, Red Sox manager Bobby Valentine publicly questioned Youkilis' motivation and physical ability to succeed. Viewing rookie Will Middlebrooks as the superior third baseman, Valentine began to play Middlebrooks over Youkilis. The Red Sox traded Youkilis to the Chicago White Sox on June 24 for pitcher Zach Stewart and utility man Brent Lillibridge. The Red Sox agreed to pay $5.5 million of Youkilis' salary to help close the deal. In the seventh inning of that day's game, Ben Cherington, the Red Sox General Manager, informed Valentine that a transaction was pending. Youkilis hit a triple in his last at bat, and received a long standing ovation while tipping his helmet to the crowd after being taken out for pinch runner Nick Punto.

=== Chicago White Sox (2012) ===
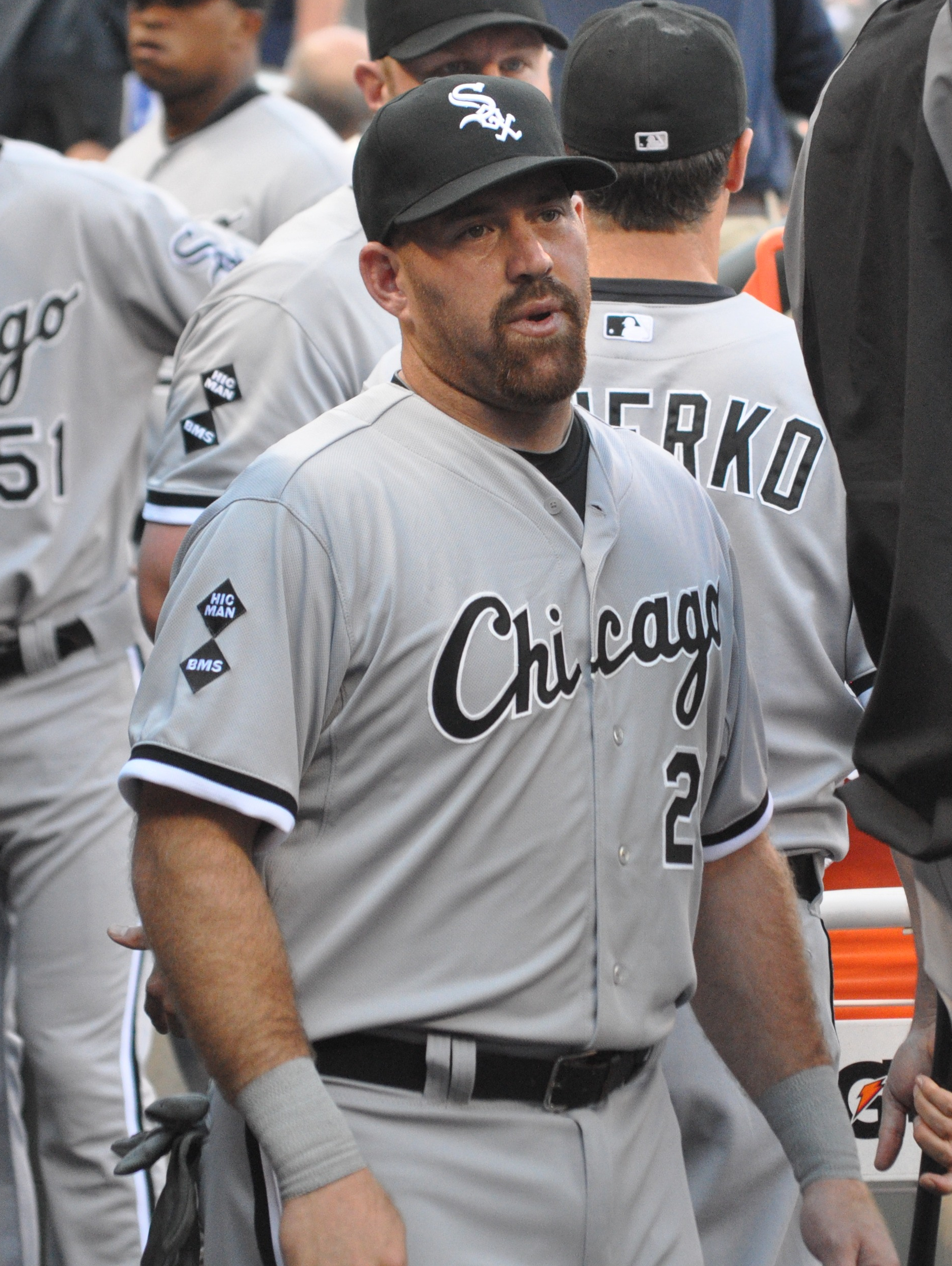
Youkilis with the Chicago White Sox

The next day, Youkilis started for the White Sox, playing against the Minnesota Twins. He went 1–for–4 with a single in the 4–1 loss. He hit his first home run as a member of the White Sox on July 3, against the Texas Rangers off of Roy Oswalt. He also went 3–6 with 4 RBIs in that game. On July 9, 2012, Youkilis was named the American League Player of the Week, after batting .478 with three home runs and 10 RBI in a 5–1 span for the White Sox. White Sox manager Robin Ventura reported that Youkilis was a competitor with a "grinder mentality", who fit in well with his White Sox teammates.

On July 16, Youkilis returned to Boston with the White Sox. During his first at bat, the Fenway Park crowd gave him a loud, extended cheer, causing Youkilis to step out of the batter's box and acknowledge fans. He went 3–for–4 with two doubles in the game.

For the season, he batted .235/.336/.409 with 19 home runs and 60 RBI, and tied for the major league lead in hit by pitch, with 17. He became a free agent after the 2012 season.

=== New York Yankees (2013) ===
On December 11, Youkilis accepted a one-year contract worth $12 million to play third base for the New York Yankees. Though Youkilis had not been popular with members of the Yankees and their fans, Robinson Canó and Alex Rodriguez publicly supported the signing, and Joba Chamberlain reached out to Youkilis in an attempt to smooth over their past differences. The deal became official on December 14. Youkilis was diagnosed with a lumbar spine sprain when the 2013 season began and was placed on the 15-day disabled list on April 30, 2013. He was activated and returned on May 30, 2013. He was placed back on the disabled list on June 14, 2013, after re-injuring his back. Youkilis then underwent surgery to repair a herniated disk in his back on June 20, 2013, and was expected to miss 10–12 weeks. However, he missed the remainder of the 2013 season. In only 28 games played, Youkilis hit a career-low .219 with two home runs and eight RBI.

=== Tohoku Rakuten Golden Eagles (2014) ===
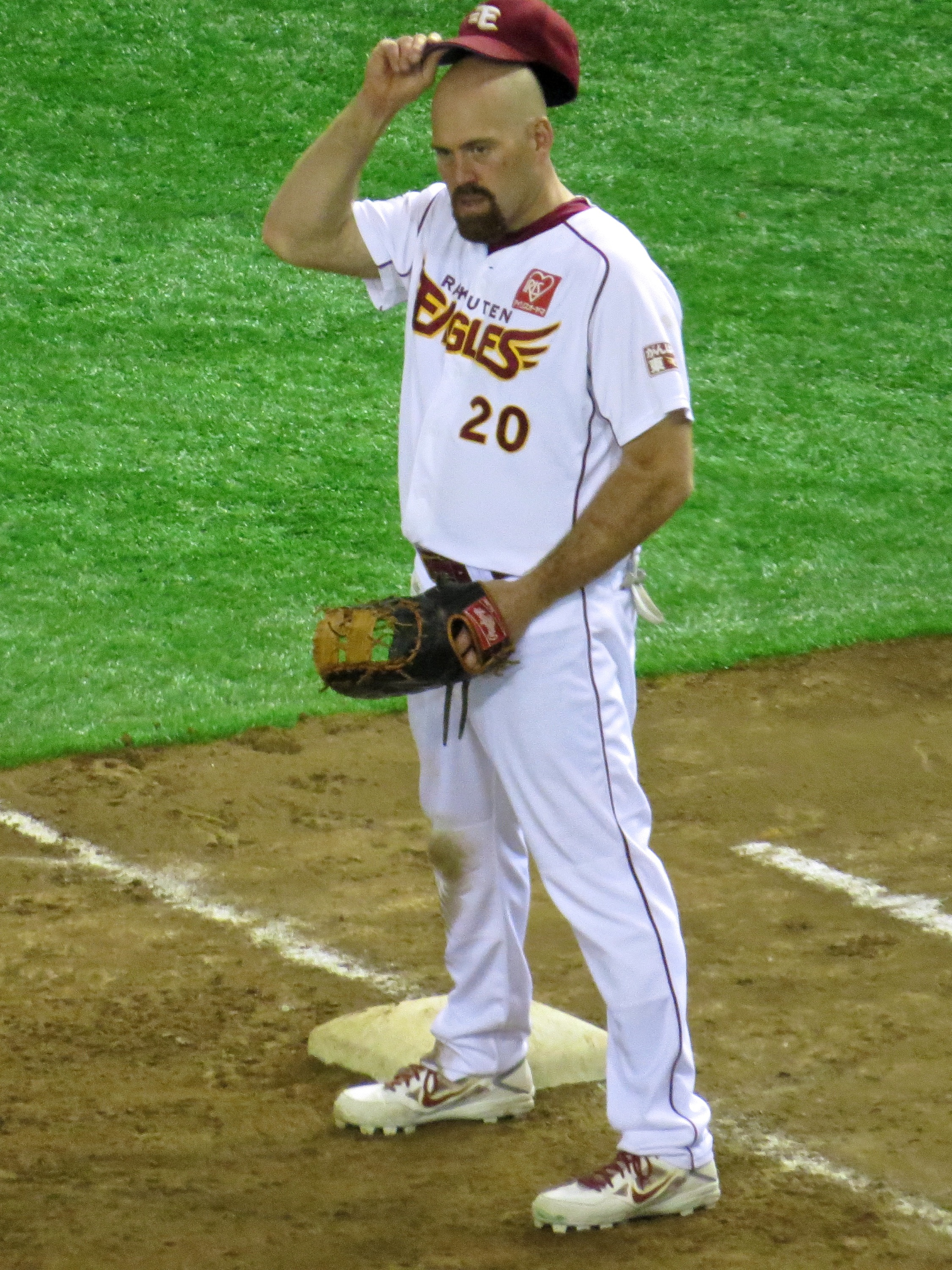
Youkilis with Rakuten

Youkilis agreed to a one-year, $4 million contract with the Tohoku Rakuten Golden Eagles of Nippon Professional Baseball for the 2014 season. He missed part of the season due to plantar fasciitis. In 21 games, Youkilis batted .215 with one home run and 11 RBI.

=== Career statistics ===
In 1,061 games over 10 seasons, Youkilis posted a .281 batting average (1,053-for-3,749) with 653 runs, 254 doubles, 18 triples, 150 home runs, 618 RBI, 539 bases on balls, 104 hit by pitch (as of 2020, 85th all-time), a .382 on-base percentage, and a .478 slugging percentage. He finished his career with a .9975 fielding percentage at first base (as of 2020, 2nd all-time, 0.001 behind Casey Kotchman), and a .991 fielding percentage overall. In 29 postseason games, he batted .306 (34-for-111) with 22 runs, nine doubles, six home runs, 17 RBI and 13 walks.

== International career ==
Youkilis competed for Team USA in the 2009 World Baseball Classic. He slashed .182/.357/.591 with three home runs in six games before being sidelined in the second round due to Achilles tendinitis, which sent him back to Red Sox spring training.

Youkilis joined Team Israel as the hitting coach, under manager Ian Kinsler, for the 2023 World Baseball Classic.

== Life after baseball ==
On October 30, 2014, Youkilis announced his retirement from baseball. In February 2015, Youkilis was hired by his former GM Theo Epstein as a scout and development consultant for the Chicago Cubs.

In August 2016, Youkilis, along with his brother Scott, purchased the Los Gatos Brewing Company, and re-opened it as the Loma Brewing Company, a brewpub in Los Gatos, California. The brewery was subsequently named as the 2017 California Commercial Beer Brewery of the Year.

In 2018, Youkilis was inducted into the Boston Red Sox Hall of Fame.

In 2022, Youkilis began working as an analyst on Red Sox broadcasts for the New England Sports Network. Youkilis left the network following the 2024 season.

== Moneyball ==
Michael Lewis's 2003 best-seller Moneyball: The Art of Winning an Unfair Game focuses on Oakland Athletics' General Manager Billy Beane's use of Sabermetrics as a tool in the evaluation of potential prospects. In the book, Lewis discusses then-prospect Youkilis in detail, and refers to him as "Euclis, the Greek God of Walks", a moniker that has stuck. Beane put more stock in empirical evidence than in scouts' hunches, and did not care that Youkilis was pudgy (or, as Lewis put it in the book, "a fat third baseman who couldn't run, throw, or field"), but just loved his ability to get on base (helped in no small part by the ballplayer's 20/11 vision). The book brought minor leaguer Youkilis his first national recognition.

"I've seen Youkilis in the shower, and I wouldn't call him the Greek god of anything."

— former Red Sox manager Terry Francona, referring to his nickname, the "Greek God of Walks"

Lewis also revealed that Beane repeatedly tried to trade for Youkilis before Youkilis reached the major leagues, but his attempts were blocked by then-Red Sox GM Theo Epstein.

Asked by a reporter what he thought of the nickname, Youkilis quipped, "It's better than being 'the Greek God of Illegitimate Children.'" But according to his father, "Kevin disliked that 'Greek God of Walks' stuff." "It was frustrating to hear fans say, 'Get a walk!'" Youkilis said. "I'll take a walk—a walk's as good as a hit—but don't you want me to hit a home run or something?"

== Religion and community service ==
=== Career highlights as a Jewish baseball player ===
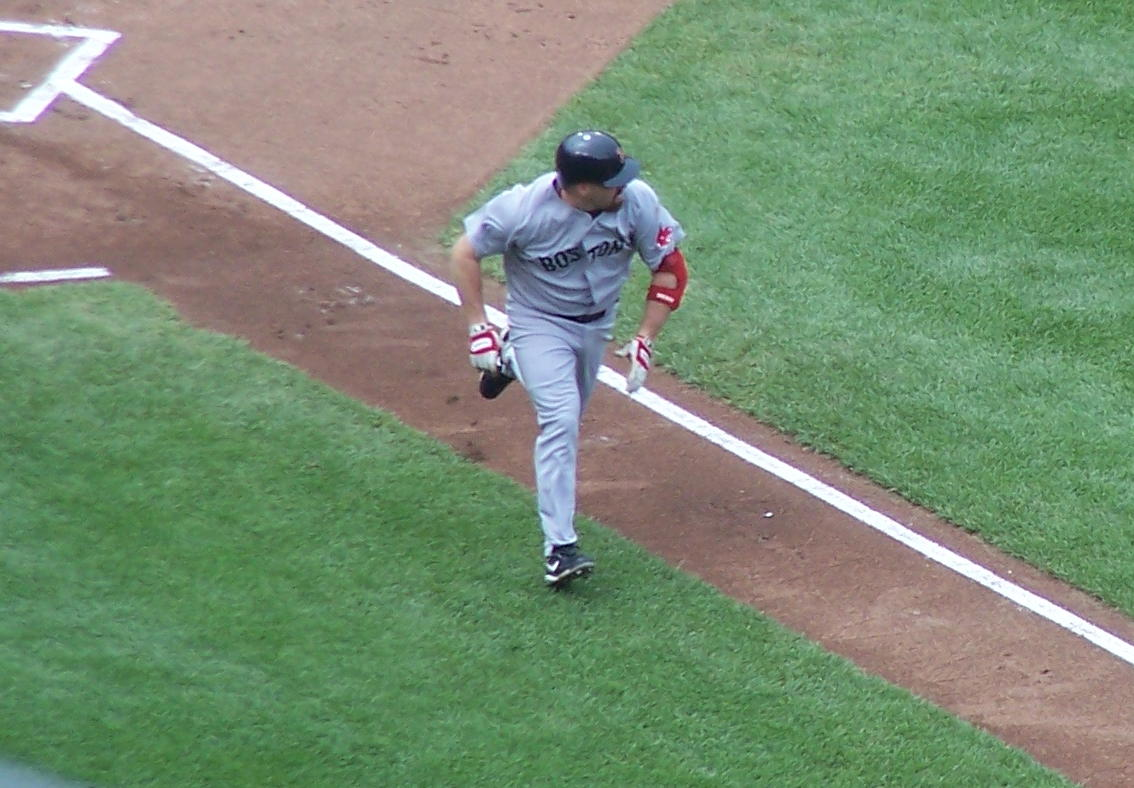
Youkilis watches a base hit through the left side of the Baltimore Orioles infield

On August 8, 2005, while playing for the Red Sox, Youkilis took the field in the 9th inning along with Adam Stern and Gabe Kapler, setting a record for the most Jewish players on the field at one time in AL history, and the most in Major League Baseball history since four Jewish players took the field for the New York Giants in a game in 1941.

Youkilis was featured in the 2008 Hank Greenberg 75th Anniversary edition of Jewish Major Leaguers Baseball Cards, published in affiliation with Fleer Trading Cards and the American Jewish Historical Society, commemorating the Jewish Major Leaguers from 1871 through 2008. He joined, among other Jewish major leaguers, Ryan Braun, Brad Ausmus, Ian Kinsler, Brian Horwitz, Gabe Kapler, Jason Marquis, Jason Hirsh, John Grabow, Craig Breslow, and Scott Schoeneweis.

He was one of three Jewish players in the 2008 All-Star Game, joining Braun and Kinsler, and one of three Jewish players on the Team USA 2009 World Baseball Classic team, joining Braun and Grabow. Kinsler says that "Youkilis always says something to me on the bases. 'Happy Passover,' he'll throw something at me."

Youkilis was named the Jewish MVP for 2008, beating out fellow All-Stars Braun and Kinsler. He was voted the top Jewish baseball player of the decade 2000–09 in online balloting, beating out Shawn Green and Braun. Through the 2018 season, his .382 on base percentage placed him fifth on the career all-time list of Jewish major leaguers (directly behind Al Rosen), his .478 slugging percentage placed him sixth (behind Shawn Green), his 254 doubles and 618 career RBI placed him 7th (behind Mike Lieberthal for doubles, and behind Al Rosen for RBIs), his 150 home runs tied him for seventh with Lieberthal (behind Al Rosen), and his 539 walks placed him eighth behind Ryan Braun.

In Jews and Baseball: An American Love Story, a 2010 documentary film narrated by Dustin Hoffman, Youkilis noted:

It's something that I probably won’t realize until my career is over, how many people are really rooting for me and cheering for me. And it's not just because I went 3-for-4, or had a great game. It's just the fact that I represent a lot of Jewish people and a lot of the Jewish heritage, and the struggles that a lot of our people have had.

He expressed interest in playing for Israel at the 2013 World Baseball Classic, if healthy. Since the 2013 qualifier was during the regular season, he was unable to compete, but he announced that he would play for the team if they made it past the qualifying round.

In an embarrassing formatting oddity, it was noticed in 2007 that multiple baseball websites such as Baseball-Reference.com and Baseball Prospectus had been using "youkike" as part of their URLs for webpages featuring Youkilis. This unintended quirk affected those sites that used an automatic URL-creating algorithm which combined the first five letters of a player's surname with the first two letters of his first name. Following the discovery, the sites manually adjusted the URLs to remove the inadvertent ethnic slur.

At one point, the University of Cincinnati expressed interest in renaming its Marge Schott Stadium to "Kevin Youkilis Field at Marge Schott Stadium," after Youkilis. However, Youkilis, sensitized by the fact that he is Jewish, declined to be associated with late Cincinnati Reds owner Marge Schott, who was known for her racist and anti-Semitic statements. Youkilis recalled his father saying to him: "Kevin that is a tremendous honor that they would think of doing this. The only problem is that our family name will never coexist with that other individual. I will never let our family name be next to someone that was filled with such hatred of our Jewish community." In 2020, Bearcats pitcher Nathan Moore along with Youkilis called for the university to remove Schott's name from the stadium. In June of that year the university's board of trustees voted unanimously to remove Schott's name from the stadium, effective immediately.

=== Philanthropy ===
Kevin Youkilis Hits For Kids is a charitable organization established by Youkilis in 2007. Youkilis's foundation focuses on raising support and awareness for the health, advocacy, safety, and medical healing of children across Massachusetts, in his hometown of Cincinnati, and beyond. Rallying the support of volunteers, local business, and the heart of Red Sox Nation, Kevin Youkilis Hits for Kids teams with existing, community-based children's charities and medical research efforts that lack sufficient funding and awareness. One organization that Hits for Kids works with is the Joslin Diabetes Center's Pediatric Health Services. He has a special sensitivity about youth suicide, since his college roommate, a close and supportive friend of his since high school, committed suicide on Thanksgiving during his sophomore year. To this day, he said, "I sit back at night and wonder what I could've done."

"In my religion, the Jewish religion, that's one of the biggest things that's taught, is giving a mitzvah, forming a mitzvah", said Youkilis. "I was always taught as a kid giving to charity. You're supposed to give a good amount of charity each and every year. … It's just a great thing when you can make a kid smile that's going through some hard times in life … I wish more people, not just athletes, would give people just a little bit of their time. It doesn't take much … It can make a huge difference."

After the first game of the ALDS, Youkilis re-shaved his head for good luck in a sign of solidarity with cancer patient Mitt Campbell. Following the team's 2007 World Series victory, Youkilis shaved his goatee for a $5,000 donation by Gillette to his foundation.

All profits from his charity wine "SauvignYoouuk Blanc", released in 2008, support Hits for Kids.

== Family ==
In November 2008, Youkilis and Enza Sambataro held a wedding ceremony in Cabo San Lucas, Mexico, though the couple never formalized their wedding. The ceremony was attended by Red Sox teammates Mike Lowell, David Ortiz, and Dustin Pedroia. Sambataro, a Newton, Massachusetts native, was CEO of Youkilis's charity, Hits for Kids, until the couple split up in 2010.

In February 2012, the Boston Herald reported that Youkilis was engaged to Julie Brady, the sister of National Football League quarterback Tom Brady. Two months later, the couple were quietly married in New York City, and a pregnancy was rumored at that time. Twelve months after the Boston Herald article, the wedded couple, along with their infant son, were featured in a 30-minute program on the YES Network. The family lives in Los Gatos, California. Youkilis is also the uncle of softball star Maya Brady.

== In popular culture ==
Youkilis made an appearance in season 1, episode 8 of the Travel Channel show Man v. Food. The episode was recorded at Boston's Eagle's Deli and featured Youkilis rooting against host (and New York Yankees fan) Adam Richman in an eating challenge. In 2011, he appeared in the music video for the Dropkick Murphys song "Going Out in Style".

== Awards and distinctions ==
- 1999 All-American Collegiate Player
- 2000 Conference USA All-Star (IF)
- 2001 2nd-team College All-American (3B)
- 2001 Conference USA All-Star (IF)
- 2001 Red Sox Minor League Player of the Year
- 2002 Trenton Player of the Year
- 2002 Red Sox Minor League Player of the Year
- 2003 Futures Game All-Star
- 2003 Eastern League All-Star (Utility)
- 2003 Baseball America AA All-Star Team
- 2003 International League Post-Season All-Star
- 2004 AL Rookie of the Month: May
- 2007 World Series Champion (Boston Red Sox)
- 2007 AL Gold Glove (1B)
- University of Cincinnati James P. Kelly Athletics Hall Of Fame (inducted 2007)
- 2006–08 Most consecutive errorless games by a first baseman (238 games)
- 2008 AL All-Star Starter (1B)
- Sycamore Athletic Hall of Fame (inducted 2008)
- 2009 AL All-Star Reserve (1B)
- 2009 Red Sox MVP
- 2011 AL All-Star Reserve (3B)
- University of Cincinnati retired his No. 36 jersey number (2015)
- Sycamore High School retired his No. 13 jersey number (2017)
- Boston Red Sox Hall of Fame (inducted 2018)
- Conference USA Hall of Fame (inducted 2019)

== See also ==
- List of Jewish Major League Baseball players
- List of University of Cincinnati people
- List of Boston Red Sox awards

== References and notes ==
Awards
Preceded by Gerald Laird	AL Rookie of the Month; May 2004	Succeeded by Bobby Crosby
Preceded by Jack Cust	AL Player of the Week; May 5–11, 2008	Succeeded by José Guillén
Preceded by David Ortiz	AL All -Star First Baseman Starter; 2008	Succeeded by Mark Teixeira
