= Steven L. Mandel =

American anesthesiologist

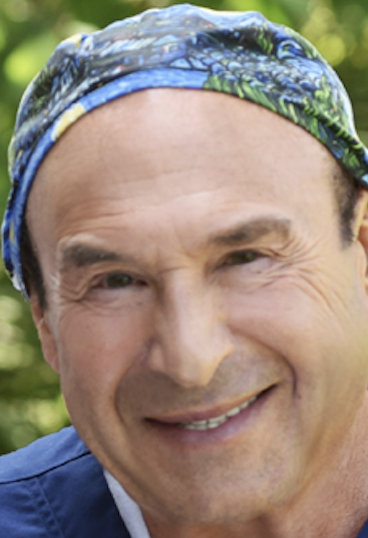
Dr. Steven Mandel

Steven L. Mandel is an American anesthesiologist and advocate for the use of ketamine in the treatment of mental health.

== Career ==
Mandel is an anesthesiologist, who began his career working in cosmetic surgery offices in California. Following the death of a family member to suspected suicide, anxiety and PTSD he went on to co-found Ketamine Clinics Los Angeles, which he established in 2013 with his son Sam Mandel. At his clinic, Mandel administers sub-anesthetic doses of ketamine for patients with chronic depression, suicidal ideation, via intravenous infusions. He has also advocated for scientific inquiry into other psychedelics and their potential use as mental health treatments. He is also the founder and first president of the American Society of Ketamine Physicians, Psychotherapists and Practitioners (ASKP3).

== Education ==
Mandel received a graduate degree in psychology from the University of Cincinnati Graduate School, his MD from the University of Southern California Keck School of Medicine, and did residencies in anesthesiology at the Massachusetts General Hospital and UCLA.
