= Joseph Edward Harry =

American educator (1863–1949)

- Born: October 1, 1863; Harford County, Maryland, U.S.
- Died: August 12, 1949 (aged 85); New York City, New York, U.S.
- Education: Johns Hopkins University (BA, PhD)
- Occupation: Educator
- Years active: 1880–1939
- Spouse: Cora Day (m. 1890)

Joseph Edward Harry (October 1, 1863 – August 12, 1949) was acting president of the University of Cincinnati in 1904. Harry was dean of the college of arts and Sciences from 1901 to 1906 and was dean of the graduate school in 1916.

== Early life ==
Joseph Edward Harry as born on October 1, 1863, in Harford County, Maryland, to Maria Jane and David Harry. He graduated from the State Normal School of Maryland in 1880. He graduated from Johns Hopkins University with a Bachelor of Arts in 1886 and a Doctor of Philosophy in 1889, studying under Basil L. Gildersleeve. His dissertation was "A Rhetorical Study of the Leptinian Orations" (1889). His postgraduate studies were in Germany in 1887.

== Career ==
Harry taught at a country school from 1880 to 1881. He was a professor of Greek and German at Georgetown College in Kentucky from 1889 to 1900. He also served as the college's athletic director and introduced football to the college. Harry was hired by University of Cincinnati president Howard Ayers to be part of the reorganization committee that led to the dismissal of almost two-thirds of the faculty. He helped establish the classics department at the college and was professor of Greek from 1900 to 1916. He was dean of the college of liberal arts from 1904 to 1906 and dean of the graduate school from 1906 to 1916. He was acting president of the college in 1904. Harry advocated for Cincinnati's park system and would lecture about "The City Beautiful", a plan for a Greek amphitheater between Clifton Heights and Western Hills.

Harry was a writer in New York City and worked for the U.S. Postal Office as a censor from 1916 to 1919. He lectured at the Sorbonne University in Paris from 1919 to 1922. He traveled and write at various colleges from 1922 to 1926. He was a professor of classics at St. Stephen's College (later Bard College, then a division of Columbia University) in 1926 to 1928. He was Hoffman Professor of Greek Language and Literature from 1928 to 1939. Harry became a trustee of the American Iona Society in 1925. He was a member of the American Philosophy Association, the American Oriental Society, the Archaeological Institute of America, and the International Congress of Archaeologists. He was secretary of the Greek section of the Congress of Arts and Sciences at the Louisiana Purchase Exposition in 1904.

== Published works ==
In 1915, Gildersleeve would describe Harry as "the most fecund conjectural critic in America" in an unpublished letter. He wrote over 300 items. His works including editor of "The Hippolytus of Euripides" (1900) and "Prometheus Bound of Aeschylus" (1905) and writer of "The Greek Tragic Poets". He wrote reviews in The Saturday Review of Literature, The New York World and The Springfield Republican.

== Personal life ==
Harry married Cora Day, daughter of Amos J. Day, of Pylesville, Maryland, on August 27, 1890. He was a Quaker.

Harry died at King's Crown Hotel in New York City on August 12, 1949.

Academic offices
Preceded by Howard Ayers	President of University of Cincinnati; 1904 – 1904	Succeeded by Charles William Dabney
