= Herman Schneider =

American architect and academic (1872–1939)

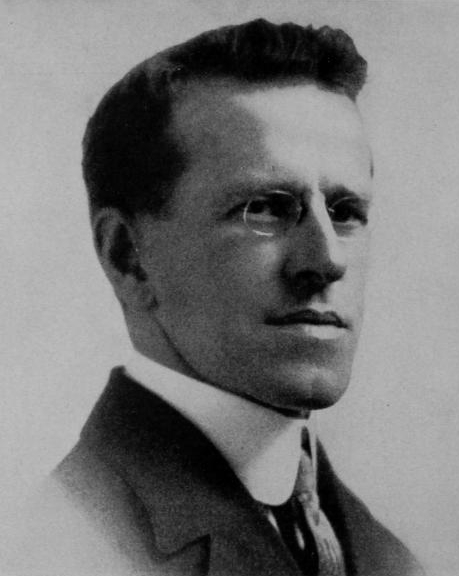
Portrait c. 1911

Herman Schneider (1872 – March 28, 1939) was an American engineer, architect, and educator. He was the main founder of cooperative education in the United States and president of the University of Cincinnati.

== Biography ==
While at Lehigh University at the beginning of the 20th century, he concluded that the traditional classroom was insufficient for technical students. Schneider observed that several of the more successful Lehigh graduates had worked to earn money before graduation. Gathering data through interviews of employers and graduates, he devised the framework for cooperative education (1901). About that time, Carnegie Technical School, now Carnegie Mellon University, opened and thereby minimized the need for Schneider's co-op plan in the region around Lehigh University. However, in 1903 the University of Cincinnati appointed Schneider to their faculty, and later, in 1906, allowed him an experimental year to implement his plan. Following that year, the University of Cincinnati gave him full permission for the co-op program.

His idea was that industry had the best equipment, and that it was very expensive for the University of Cincinnati to purchase equipment that would quickly become outdated. Further, there was the expense of maintaining the building. He surmised that it would take four or more years for a student trained in engineering to become familiar with an employer's needs. At that time there were industrial, mechanical and civil engineering programs.

Schneider, beginning from the rank of assistant professor, rose through the rank of dean of engineering (1906–1928) to become president (1929–32) of the University of Cincinnati, based largely upon the strength of the co-op program. Throughout his career, he was an advocate for the co-op framework. His thirty years of service to the University of Cincinnati are partly credited for that institution's worldwide fame.

Cincinnati's example was soon followed by Northeastern University using co-op in their engineering program, in 1922 extending it to the College of Business Administration and other new colleges. By 1919, Antioch College had adapted the co-op practices to their liberal arts curricula, for which reason many called co-op the "Antioch Plan".

In 1926, Dean Schneider invited those interested in forming an Association of Co-operative Colleges (ACC) to the University of Cincinnati for the first convention. The idea took hold, and was followed by three more annual conventions. In 1929, the Society for the Promotion of Engineering Education, now called American Society for Engineering Education (ASEE), formed the Division of Cooperative Engineering Education, incorporating the membership of the ACC. Also in 1926 the General Motors Institute (GMI) was opened following this model to train new General Motors hires. This school was later renamed Kettering University.

In 1965, The Cooperative Education and Internship Association (CEIA) created "The Dean Herman Schneider Award" in honor of the contributions made by Dean Schneider in cooperative education. The award is given annually to an outstanding educator from faculty or administration.

Schneider was unable to get those at the University of Pittsburgh to accept his ideas, for he was only an assistant professor. He wrote an article about cooperative engineering, which Charles William Dabney, who was recently appointed University President read. Concurrently Schneider came to Dabney, and wanted to earn a masters or a PhD in order that people would listen to him. Dabney had come from Tennessee, and he had a similar idea that wanted to propose in the Ag School. He was impressed with Schneider's depth of thinking and told him that he did not need additional degrees, he simply needed to be Dean. Thus, he asked Schneider to be patient, for there would soon be a position open. Shortly, the original dean resigned, and Schneider was appointed in his place.

The value was that the engineering school, which had entered into cooperative arrangements with what was to become Milicron, and several other tool and die shops, would hire these men, teach them to use the equipment and then try to design better equipment. For their work they were paid, but the school now could teach twice as many students—giving them the mathematics, drawing, physics, etc., that they would need, and then they would go out and work x months and implement their ideas. The industries liked this because they got engineers upon graduation who could start immediately in solving their problems. Further, they knew that these men would probably keep working on the problem that they had uncovered while they were working at their shops, for which they didn't have to pay—the latter was not advertised, but could be predicted if one picked people who had an engineering mind. Cincinnati had a large number of men trained in Germany, who also were able to design or improve machines. Cincinnati was in the business of making the machine that would make the machine.

Schneider worked hard at his deanship, but Frederick Charles Hicks succeeded Dabney when he left in 1920. A number of similar efforts in fields that would benefit from practical combined with academic work—now called internships—were presented to Schneider. When Hicks left, there was considerable angst. Hicks had been dean of Commerce (Business) and they understood each other's goals. After some persuasion, Schneider became the interim President of the University, reluctantly, be he set to doing the same kind of forward thinking that he had done with Engineering. Times were harder, and the University did not pay very much. Several men looked at the job but saw it as a municipal university, not very highly ranked, and left. Therefore, Schneider finally took the job and was president of the University for several years.

He died on March 28, 1939, in Cincinnati, Ohio, at 67 years old.

Academic offices
Preceded by Frederick Charles Hicks	President of University of Cincinnati; 1929 – 1932	Succeeded by Raymond Walters
