= Tanya Froehlich =

American pediatrician

- Born: Pennsylvania

Academic background
- Education: MD, Yale University School of Medicine; MS, Epidemiology, 2007, University of Cincinnati
- Thesis: ADHD-related executive functions: interactions of a DRD4 polymorphism, lead, and sex (2007)

Academic work
- Institutions: University of Cincinnati

Tanya Elizabeth Froehlich is an American pediatrician. She is a professor of pediatrics and the Jack Rubinstein Endowed Chair of Developmental and Behavioral Pediatrics at the University of Cincinnati and Cincinnati Children's Hospital Medical Center, where she is Director of the Division of Developmental and Behavioral Pediatrics. Froehlich's research has investigated the epidemiology of and environmental contributors to ADHD as well as predictors and correlates of ADHD treatment response. She has a particular interest in identifying and treating what she has termed "complex" ADHD, including ADHD in children with coexisting neurodevelopmental and behavioral disorders. Froehlich's research has been cited over 7,800 times in the scientific literature.

== Early life and education ==
Originally from rural northwestern Pennsylvania, Froehlich earned her bachelor's degree from Columbia University, where she graduated summa cum laude and was elected to Phi Beta Kappa. She then earned her medical degree from Yale University School of Medicine. where she was awarded the New England Pediatric Society Prize and was elected to the medical honor society Alpha Omega Alpha. Froehlich was placed at the Children's Hospital of Philadelphia for her residency. After finishing her residency, she completed both a Developmental and Behavioral Pediatrics fellowship and a National Research Service Award fellowship at the Cincinnati Children's Hospital Medical Center. Froehlich also earned her Master's degree at the affiliated institute, the University of Cincinnati. Her thesis was published in 2007 and titled ADHD-related Executive Functions: Interactions of a DRD4 Polymorphism, Lead, and Sex.

== Career ==
Upon completing her fellowships, Froehlich became a developmental and behavioral pediatrics attending physician and faculty member at Cincinnati Children's Hospital Medical Center. In September 2007, she led a study that found that 8.7 percent of children in the United States met diagnostic criteria for ADHD. The study found that children with ADHD who were socioeconomically disadvantaged and/or lacked health insurance were less likely to receive consistent treatment for their ADHD than their more advantaged peers. To reach this conclusion, she collected data from the National Health and Nutrition Examination Survey and based their ADHD criteria on the Diagnostic and Statistical Manual for Mental Disorders, Fourth Edition. As a result, she received the 2008 Child Health Research Career Development Award. Two years later, Froehlich published a study in the journal Pediatrics that found a direct link between exposure to lead and tobacco smoke and ADHD. Her research team found that eliminating environmental exposure to lead and tobacco smoke could lead to a reduction in ADHD cases in children between the ages of eight and 15. Additionally, Froehlich led subsequent studies documenting a link between higher bisphenol A exposure and increased likelihood of ADHD as well an association between higher pyrethroid pesticide exposure and increased likelihood of ADHD.

Building off of her previous research, Froehlich also began to study ways to help doctors properly prescribe ADHD medication for children. In 2010, she led the first-ever placebo-controlled pharmacogenetic drug trial for ADHD in school-age children (between the ages of 7 and 11) to evaluate variants of the dopamine transporter (DAT) and dopamine receptor D4 (DRD4) genes using both parent and teacher ratings of children's symptoms. The following year, she published a study which concluded that children with specific variants of the dopamine transporter (DAT) and dopamine receptor D4 (DRD4) genes reacted more positively to methylphenidate. Beyond examining genetic predictors of ADHD medication response, Froehlich also focused on how marginalized and disadvantaged youth dealt with ADHD compared to their wealthier companions. In 2013, she led a study which found that psychotropic drug prescriptions for preschoolers were highest amongst boys, white children, and those without private insurance. Froehlich's additional studies have shown a link between children's baseline (pre-medication) behavioral symptomatology (such as symptoms of anxiety, oppositionality, and cognitive disengagement as well as sleep problems) and response to the ADHD medication methylphenidate, suggesting that these factors could be useful in predicting response.

Froehlich was later influential in the development of the American Academy of Pediatrics 2019 Clinical Practice Guidelines for the Diagnosis and Treatment of ADHD. She also co-authored new guidelines for the standard care for children and teens with complex ADHD symptoms, which was published in the Journal of Developmental and Behavioral Pediatrics. When speaking of the new guidelines, she said "unlike the American Academy of Pediatrics ADHD Clinical Practice Guideline, which focuses on more straightforward cases of ADHD, the Society for Developmental and Behavioral Pediatrics guideline focuses on the care of children with ADHD who have complicating coexisting developmental and mental health disorders such as autism spectrum disorders, learning disorders, anxiety, and depression. As such, the SDBP Complex ADHD guideline addresses a long neglected clinical care gap and provides a valuable new resource for pediatric health care providers." She also helped establish a free quality improvement technology to help pediatricians, parents and educators improve the quality of care for those with ADHD.

Froehlich has also served in numerous national leadership positions for the field of Developmental and Behavioral Pediatrics. She served as a member of the board of directors (2018-2024) and president (2022-2023) for the Society for Developmental and Behavioral Pediatrics. For the American Professional Society for ADHD and Related Disorders, she has served as treasurer (2020-2022) and co-chair of the Pediatric-Psychiatry Interface Special Interest Group (2021–present). Froehlich is also a member of the Editorial Board for the Journal of Developmental and Behavioral Pediatrics and was previously a standing member of the National Institute of Child Health and Human Development Biobehavioral and Behavioral Sciences subcommittee/study section (2018-2022). Furthermore, Froehlich is a member of the executive committee and chair of the Attention Disorders Research Node for the national Developmental and Behavioral Pediatrics Research Network (DBPNet).
