= Rhoza A. Walker =

American writer

- Rhoza Walker, from a 1937 newspaper
- Born: Rhoza Anna Walker; January 20, 1916; Cincinnati, Ohio, U.S.
- Died: July 2, 1998 (age 82); Cleveland, Ohio, U.S.
- Other names: Rhoza Walker Bullock, Rhoza Walker Simmons, Rhoza Simmons Bailey
- Occupations: Artist, writer, educator, interior designer, psychologist

Rhoza Anna Walker Bullock Simmons Bailey (January 20, 1916 – July 2, 1998) was an American writer, artist, psychologist, and educator, based in Ohio.

== Early life and education ==
Walker was born in Cincinnati, Ohio, the daughter of George A. Walker and Madeline Bean Walker. While she was in school, she won top prizes in a statewide art contest sponsored by the Kentucky Negro Educational Association. She graduated from the University of Cincinnati, where she was the first Black female winner of the Jones Oratorical Contest in 1937. Also in 1937, she joined rescue efforts during flooding in Cincinnati. She earned a master's degree from the University of Cincinnati in 1940, with a thesis titled "Housing as an Educational Problem for Negroes in Cincinnati." She completed doctoral studies at Case Western Reserve University, in psychology. She was a member of Alpha Kappa Alpha.

== Career ==
Walker considered herself artistic, and expressed her artistic nature in various ways. She acted in plays. She painted neckties and other garments, made metal jewelry and household objects, and created advertising for her husband's dry-cleaning business in Ohio. She wrote poems, essays, stories, and plays, and gave dramatic readings and lectures. She had an interior design business.

Walker also taught school in Cleveland and Dayton, and was a high school guidance counselor. She was education director of the Urban League's Street Academy, addressing the needs of at-risk teens in Cleveland. In her later years she worked at the Fairhill Mental Health Center and Western Reserve Habilitation Center. She was a member of St. James AME Church in Cleveland.

== Publications ==
In addition to articles and poems published in The Crisis, Negro History Bulletin, and other national periodicals, Walker wrote a novel, The Left Bank of Hell, based on the life of Adam Clayton Powell Jr.

- "The Negro Teacher in National Defense" (1942, article)
- "I Believe in Democracy So Much" (1942, poem)
- "We Are Only Pennants" (1942, poem)
- "The Fifth Freedom" (1943, poem)
- "Please, Dear God" (1944, poem)
- "Escape" (1944, poem)
- "Only in America" (1945, poem)
- Red Hog (play)
- "Search for Beulah Mae" (story)
- Brass Winds (collection of poems)
- Steel, Stone and Satin: A Trilogy of Poetry (1968, collection of prose and poems, including "I Am Black America")
- Earth by January (1978)

== Personal life ==
Walker married three times. She married Leon Simmons Jr. in 1952, and Oliver W. Bailey around 1988. She died in 1998, at the age of 82, in Cleveland. Her poems "Only in America", "Please, Dear God", and "I Believe in Democracy So Much" were included in an anthology of African-American women's writing, Bitter Fruit: African American Women in World War II (1999), edited by Maureen Honey.
