= Henry Turner Eddy =

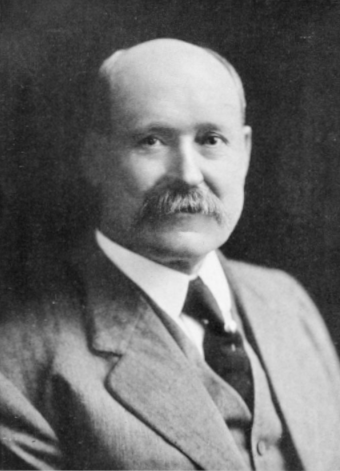
- Born: June 9, 1844; Stoughton, Massachusetts
- Died: December 11, 1921 (aged 77); Minneapolis, Minnesota
- Education: Yale University; Cornell University
- Occupation: Educator
- Spouse: Sebella Elizabeth Taylor (m. 1870)
- Children: 5

Henry Turner Eddy (June 9, 1844 – December 11, 1921) was a United States science and engineering educator. He was president of the University of Cincinnati and the Rose Polytechnic Institute.

== Biography ==
Henry Turner Eddy was born in Stoughton, Massachusetts on June 9, 1844. He was educated at Yale and later took a further scientific course in Berlin and Paris. He married Sebella Elizabeth Taylor on January 4, 1870, and they had five children.

He was elected as a member to the American Philosophical Society in 1877.

In 1872, Turner received the first Ph.D. awarded by Cornell University. After holding a professorship in mathematics, astronomy and civil engineering at the University of Cincinnati 1874–90, and acting as dean of the academic faculty of that institution (1874–77, 1884–89), he became its president in 1890. He was also president of the Rose Polytechnic Institute at Terre Haute, Indiana, from 1891 to 1894, when he accepted the chair of engineering and mechanics at the University of Minnesota. He became dean of the graduate school of the University of Minnesota in 1906, and professor and dean emeritus in 1912.

He died in Minneapolis on December 11, 1921.

== Works ==
- Analytical Geometry (1874)
- Researches in Graphical Statics (1878)
- Thermodynamics (1879)
- Neue Constructionen aus der graphischen Statik (1880)
- Maximum Stresses under Concentrated Loads (1890)
- Theory of the Flexure and Strength of Rectangular Flat Plates Applied to Reinforced Concrete Floor Slabs (1913)
- Concrete-Steel Construction (1914)

He wrote numerous scientific and technical papers. In 1893 in Chicago, he read a paper Modern Graphical Developments at the International Mathematical Congress held in connection with the World's Columbian Exposition.

== Notes ==
Academic offices
Preceded by George W Harper	President of the University of Cincinnati; 1874 – 1875	Succeeded by Thomas Vickers
