= Frederick Charles Hicks =

Frederick Charles Hicks (January 1, 1863 – September 7, 1953) was an American professor of economics, later President of the University of Cincinnati from 1920 to 1928.

== Biography ==
Born in St. Clair County, Michigan, he graduated at the University of Michigan in 1886, with a PhD in 1890. After teaching at public schools of Michigan and Indiana, he was professor of economics at the University of Missouri from 1892 to 1900, when he moved to the University of Cincinnati, of which he became president in 1920. During his term as president, a number of buildings were constructed, including Swift Hall (1925).

== Personal life ==
On September 18, 1890, he married in Chicago to Verna E. Sheldon.

Academic offices
Preceded by Charles William Dabney	President of the University of Cincinnati; 1920 – 1928	Succeeded by Herman Schneider
