= Kay Kinoshita =

Experimental particle physicist

- Scientific career
- Fields: Physics
- Institutions: University of Cincinnati

Kay Kinoshita is an experimental particle physicist. She is a professor at University of Cincinnati.

Kinoshita completed her undergraduate studies in physics at Harvard University in 1976 and her PhD at University of California, Berkeley in 1981. She then returned to work at Harvard, before becoming a full professor at Virginia Tech in 1993.

She is currently a professor at University of Cincinnati and was head of the Physics department 2009-2016. She is investigating topics such as dark matter.

She was a 2020 Fellow of the American Physical Society for "innovative contributions to the study of b-quarks and for leadership in accelerator searches for magnetic monopoles."
