= Gregory Mixon =

American author and professor of history

Gregory Lamont Mixon is an American author and professor of history. He is the associate professor of history at the University of North Carolina, Charlotte.

He received a Ph.D. from the University of Cincinnati in 1989.

His book The Atlanta Riot: Race, Class, and Violence in a New South City examined the 1906 Atlanta race riots. A review in the Georgia Historical Quarterly called it the definitive account of the riot. He also wrote about the African American militias in the Southeastern United States after the American Civil War.

== Bibliography ==
- Show Thyself a Man: Georgia State Troops, Colored, 1865–1905, University Press of Florida (2016)
- The Atlanta Riot: Race, Class, and Violence in a New South City, University Press of Florida (2004)
- The Atlanta Riot of 1906
