= Joseph A. Steger =

American academic (1937–2013)

President of the University of Cincinnati
- In office 1984–2003
- Preceded by: Henry R. Winkler
- Succeeded by: Nancy L. Zimpher

Personal details
- Born: February 17, 1937 Philadelphia, Pennsylvania, U.S.
- Died: May 9, 2013 (aged 76) Cincinnati, Ohio, U.S.

Joseph A. Steger (February 17, 1937 – May 9, 2013) was an American academic. He served as president of the University of Cincinnati from 1984 to 2003. He was succeeded by Nancy L. Zimpher.

Steger had PhD and MS degrees from Kansas State University in Psychophysics and Statistics, and a BA from Gettysburg College in Experimental Psychology.

Academic offices
| Preceded by Henry R. Winkler | President of the University of Cincinnati; 1984 – 2003 | Succeeded by Nancy L. Zimpher |
