= Sam Mandel =

American actor

Sam Mandel is an American actor and co-founder of Ketamine Clinics of Los Angeles.

== Career ==
Mandel cofounded Ketamine Clinics of Los Angeles with his father in 2014 and initially served as COO before becoming CEO. By 2025 the clinic had a 17-person multidisciplinary team that provided services including Ketamine Infusion Therapy, TMS Therapy, and Holistic Psychiatry. He has advocated for the importance of including expertise in anesthesia and mental health alongside the administering of ketamine treatment. Gleb Tsipursky has said of his work that, "Mandel's outlook suggests that the success and acceptance of ketamine could lay the groundwork for integrating other psychedelic medicines into mental health care." He has also served as a public commentator on public health in the news and popular magazines like Allure, NPR, USA Today, and Scientific American.

== Acting career ==
At the start of his career Mandel played a recurring guest star role on Everybody Hates Chris, playing Fisher, a friend of young Chris Rock. He has also acted for the stage. In 2018 he played the lead role of Reuven Malter in the play The Chosen at the Fountain Theatre in Los Angeles, a portrayal that the Los Angeles Times called "gregarious and sincere, inquisitive and enthusiastic".
