= Henry R. Winkler =

American historian (1916–2012)

Henry Ralph Winkler (October 27, 1916 – December 26, 2012) was an American historian. He was president of the University of Cincinnati from 1977 to 1984. Winkler was the only UC graduate to hold the office of president of the university. He was selected to serve as president in December, 1977. Prior to his position at Cincinnati he served as vice president of Rutgers University. He was succeeded at Cincinnati by Joseph A Steger.

Academic offices
Preceded by Warren G. Bennis	President of the University of Cincinnati; 1977 – 1984	Succeeded by Joseph A Steger
