= Howard Ayers =

American biologist

Howard Ayers (May 21, 1861, in Olympia, Washington – October 1933, in Avondale, Ohio) was an American biologist who served as president of the University of Cincinnati from 1899 to 1904. His earliest recorded ancestor was Capt. John Ayers who came from England in 1648 and later settled in Ipswich and Brookfield.

== Academic career ==
Ayers graduated from Harvard University in 1883, and from the University of Freiburg in 1885; he also studied at the University of Strasburg and the University of Heidelberg. He then spent a year in the Department of Zoology at the University of Michigan. He also taught zoology at Harvard and Radcliffe College, and ran the Department of Zoology at the University of Missouri. As well, he served as director of Edward Phelps Allis's Lake Laboratory, and as an investigator at the Marine Biological Laboratory.

In 1899, Ayers was recruited to serve as the president of the University of Cincinnati. In January 1900, he fired the majority of the university's faculty. Philip van Ness Myers, one of the few members of the faculty who Ayers had not fired, called the mass firing a "professional assassination" that "violated every principle of humanity and justice", and resigned. The Journal of Education described it as an example of "autocracy run mad".

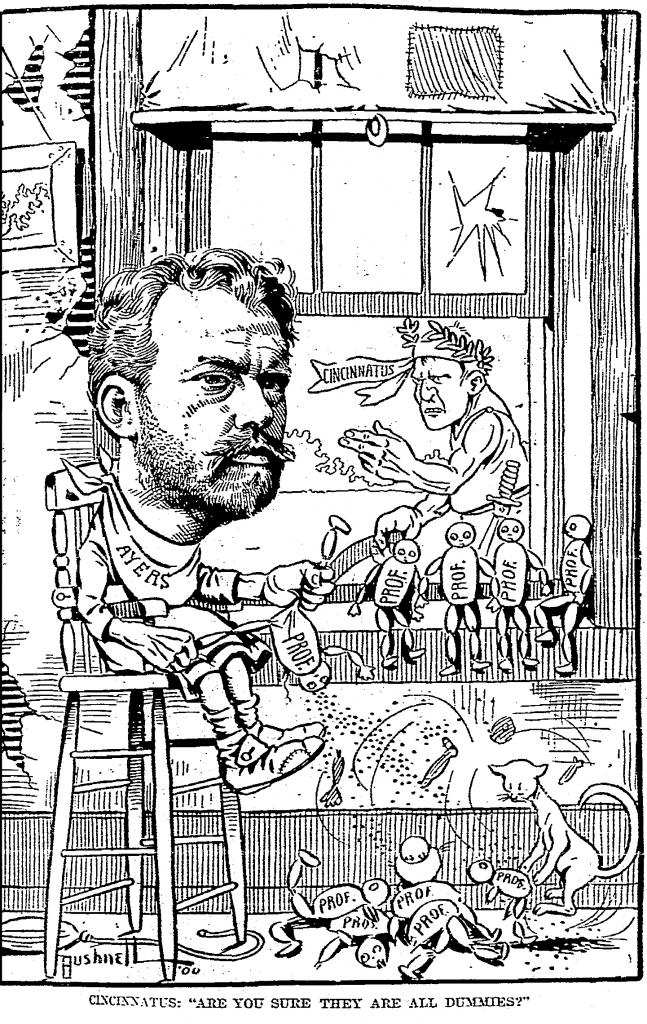
Cartoon by E. A. Bushnell, from the Cincinnati Post, about Ayers and the mass firing

In November 1903, the university's board of trustees declared Ayers' position vacant, adding that he would remain in office until a replacement could be found. Charles William Dabney was selected to replace Ayers beginning in July 1904; however, due to continued conflict, Ayers was fired in April 1904.

Later that month, William Howard Taft and Horace Lurton recommended that Ayers be chosen to replace Dabney as the president of the University of Tennessee, with Taft sending a letter to the board of trustees on behalf of "Dr. Ayers of Cincinnati". The board's reply acknowledged that they had received Taft's recommendation of "Dr. Ayres", and they subsequently elected Brown Ayres; however, University of Tennessee Knoxville Vice Chancellor Betsey Creekmoore has called the notion that the board meant to hire Ayers instead of Ayres a "myth", pointing out that Taft's recommendation of Ayers was in April, and the selection of Ayres was in August — and only came after the board first tried, and failed, to hire C. Alphonso Smith in June.

== Professional memberships ==
Ayers was a fellow of the American Association for the Advancement of Science, and a member of the American Society of Naturalists and the American Morphological Society.

== Personal life ==
In 1886, Ayers married Pauline F.A. Shafer. They had seven daughters, including performer Paula Lind Ayers, and one son, who falsified his age so that he could enlist in the US Army when he was 14, but died of pneumonia before he could be sent into combat in the First World War.
