= Hattie V. Feger =

American educator

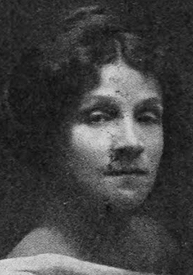
- Hattie V. Feger, from a 1924 publication.
- Born: Hattie Virginia Feger; Louisiana
- Occupation: Educator
- Years active: 1890s-1940s

Hattie Virginia Feger was an American educator. She was on the faculty of Clark Atlanta University in the 1930s and 1940s.

== Early life ==
Feger was from New Orleans, Louisiana. She trained as a teacher at Straight University, with further coursework at Michigan State Normal College and the University of Chicago. She completed a bachelor's degree in 1921 and a master's degree in 1924, both at the University of Cincinnati. Her master's thesis was titled "Teacher Standards in Negro Schools".

While at Cincinnati, she was an organizer and first president of the school's chapter of the Alpha Kappa Alpha sorority. She was a guest of honor at an Alpha Kappa Alpha gathering in Oakland, California, in 1939.

== Career ==
Feger was a teacher in New Orleans as a young woman. In 1893, she attended the World's Columbian Exposition in Chicago. In 1894, she was a founding officer of the Colored Women's Club of New Orleans. She was a member of the city's Phylis Wheatley Club.

Feger was principal of the Miro Street School in New Orleans beginning in 1911. When the school building was destroyed in a 1915 hurricane. She arranged for temporary classrooms in other buildings after the storm passed, and remained principal when a new school building opened in 1916. She left the following school year to attend graduate school, replaced by Fannie C. Williams.

Feger was director of education at the West End Branch of the YWCA in Cincinnati in 1930. She was active in the Atlanta branch of the NAACP in the 1930s. From 1931, Feger was a professor of education at Atlanta University and Spelman College. She served on the Atlanta University Defense Committee during World War II, and retired from the school in 1944.
