= Shari Barkin =

American physician

- Born: Maryland, US
- Spouse: Jeff Frumkin

Academic background
- Education: AB, zoology and education, 1986, Duke University; MD, University of Cincinnati; MSHS, health services research, 1998 University of California

Academic work
- Institutions: Children's Healthcare of Atlanta/Emory University; Vanderbilt University Medical Center; Wake Forest University

Shari L. Barkin is an American pediatrician, physician-scientist, and academic administrator who serves as the George W. Brumley Jr. Professor and Chair of Pediatrics at Emory University School of Medicine, Pediatrician-in-Chief at Children's Healthcare of Atlanta, and executive director of the Pediatric Institute. Barkin is known for leading pragmatic randomized controlled trials addressing childhood obesity and health disparities among underserved populations. In 2021, she was elected a member of the National Academy of Medicine for "pioneering pragmatic randomized controlled trials in community settings, undertaken in collaboration with parents and community partners, and addressing health disparities in pediatric obesity."

== Early life and education ==
Barkin was born and raised in Maryland as the daughter of a doctor and a nurse. She completed her undergraduate degree at Duke University before completing her medical degree at the University of Cincinnati. After her pediatric residency at Children's Hospital Los Angeles, Barkin was selected as a UCLA Robert Wood Johnson Clinical Scholar and completed a fellowship in Health Services Research. During her time in Cincinnati, she was influenced by Norma Wagner who identified her as a "change agent."

Growing up, Barkin danced with The Washington Ballet and hitchhiked across Australia and New Zealand.

== Research ==
Barkin's research focuses on pediatric obesity prevention, behavioral interventions, health equity, and community-based clinical trials. Her work applies an ecological framework that examines children within the context of their families and communities, and explores interactions among behavioral, environmental, developmental, and biological factors that influence childhood health outcomes.

She led the Growing Right Onto Wellness (GROW) Trial, a National Institutes of Health-funded study that has been described as the largest and longest pragmatic randomized controlled trial aimed at obesity prevention among under-served preschool-age children. The trial evaluated family-centered behavioral interventions designed to improve health outcomes and reduce obesity risk among low-income populations.

Barkin also led the first intervention trial conducted through the Pediatric Research in Office Settings (PROS) Network, the research network of the American Academy of Pediatrics. The study involved more than 100 pediatric practices and nearly 5,000 families across the United States, Canada, and Puerto Rico and examined office-based approaches to violence prevention and injury reduction.

Barkin's research has incorporated systems science and computational modeling approaches to understand childhood physical activity and obesity. Her NIH-funded study Reducing Health Disparities in Physical Activity uses agent-based modeling and longitudinal data to examine factors associated with physical activity trajectories among diverse populations.

Barkin is a principal investigator of Virtual Housecalls: Redesigning Pediatric Primary Care Adolescent Obesity Treatment, a National Institutes of Health-funded pragmatic randomized clinical trial launched in 2025. The study evaluates a teleheath-delivered behavioral intervention for adolescents with obesity in pediatric primary care settings and seeks to develop scalable approaches for obesity treatment.

She has also served as a senior advisor to the All of Us Research Program Data and Research Center and has contributed to the National Institutes of Health's Nutrition for Precision Health initiative, which seeks to improve understanding of the relationship between nutrition, health, and disease using data from the All of Us cohort.

Her research has been supported by the National Institutes of Health and other public and private funders. She has authored more than 130 peer-reviewed publications.

== Career ==
Following her residency and fellowship, Barkin accepted an academic position at Wake Forest University. She eventually left Wake Forest to join joined Vanderbilt University Medical Center in 2006.

As the director of the Division of General Pediatrics at the Monroe Carell Jr. Children's Hospital at Vanderbilt, Barkin was elected to serve as vice president of the Society for Pediatric Research in 2014 and president in 2016. Following this, she was named 2018 Pediatrician of the Year by the Tennessee Chapter of the American Academy of Pediatrics. In 2019, Barkin was also honored with the Academic Pediatric Association Research Award for her work in youth violence and obesity.

In 2022, Barkin was appointed chair and Physician-in-Chief of Children's Hospital of Richmond at Virginia Commonwealth University and held the Jessie Ball duPont Foundation Chair in Pediatrics. In 2024, she became Chair of the Department of Pediatrics at Emory University School of Medicine and Pediatrician-in-Chief at Children's Healthcare of Atlanta. She was also named executive director of the Pediatric Institute.

== Leadership and Service ==
Barkin served on the Board on Children, Youth, and Families of the National Academies of Sciences, Engineering, and Medicine from 2009 to 2016. She chaired the Institute of Medicine planning workshop on the epigenetics of early childhood obesity and later chaired the National Academies consensus study Assessing Prevalence and Trends in Obesity: Navigating the Evidence.

Between 2014 and 2018, Barkin served as vice president and subsequently President of the Society for Pediatric Research. From 2020 to 2024, she served on the National Advisory Child Health and Human Development Council of the Eunice Kennedy Shriver National Institute of Child Health and Human Development.

== Honors and awards ==
- 2021 - Elected to the National Academy of Medicine
- 2021 - Levi Watkins Jr. Award for commitment to diversity, Vanderbilt University School of Medicine
- 2019 - Academic Pediatric Association Research Award
- 2018 - Tennessee Pediatrician of the Year, American Academy of Pediatrics
- 2014-2018 - Vice President with succession to President of the Society for Pediatric Research
- 2012 - Distinguished Alumni Award, University of Cincinnati College of Medicine
- 2012 - Kautz Alumni Masters Award, University of Cincinnati
- 2012 - Selected Representative for the National Academy of Sciences, ESRC; International Scientific Symposium: "Social science and epigenetics: opportunities and challenges" Edinburgh, Scotland
- 2012 - Awarded membership American Pediatric Society
- 2011 - Special Achievement Award for developing and leading the Nashville Collaborative, Tennessee Chapter of the American Academy of Pediatrics
- 2011 - Keynote Address: "Timing is Everything: Childhood Obesity from Physiology to Public Health"' PAS/ASPR Opening General Session, Denver, Colorado
- 2009-2016 - Board Member for the National Academy of Sciences Board of Children, Youth and Families
- 2007-2008 - Executive Leadership in Academic Medicine (ELAM) fellow
- 2007 - Named one of "Top Ten Women to Watch" in Nashville Medical News
- 2006 - Scholarship Award to the Center for Creative Leadership (CCL)
- 2002 - Selected as a Pediatric Leader, American Academy of Pediatrics'' Pediatric Leadership Alliance
- 2002 - New Clinical Investigator Award, Wake Forest University Health Sciences
- 2002 - Robert Wood Johnson Generalist Faculty Scholar
- 2001 - Young New Investigator Finalist, Society for Adolescent Medicine

== Personal life ==
Barkin and her husband, Jeff Frumkin, have three children together.
