= Jerry Kathman =

Jerome C. Kathman
- Born: February 6, 1953; Cincinnati, Ohio
- Occupations: President & CEO, LPK
- Predecessor: Mort Libby
- Spouse: Liz Grubow

Jerry Kathman is president and chief executive officer of LPK, the largest independent brand design agency in the world with offices in North America, Europe and Asia. Kathman is recognized within the industry as a leading authority on the role of design in brand building. His global experience has provided Fortune 500 companies with insights into both the opportunities and pitfalls of taking a brand beyond national boundaries.

Kathman sits on the Board of the Design Management Institute and is a faculty member of the In-Store Marketing Institute. He has appeared on CNN and CNBC and has been quoted or published in The New York Times, The Wall Street Journal, Brandweek, Design Management Review, Die Welt (a leading national German newspaper), CB News (a leading French business magazine), and Hong Kong Economic Times. Kathman has authored numerous white papers in academic and professional journals on topical issues in brand design development and management.

== Guest lecturing ==
He lectures regularly to business and academic audiences in North America, Europe and Asia, including Columbia University, University of California at Berkeley, New York University, the Hong Kong Design Centre, Singapore Design Festival, the Design Management Institute, and the In-Store Marketing Institute.
