= Charles William Dabney =

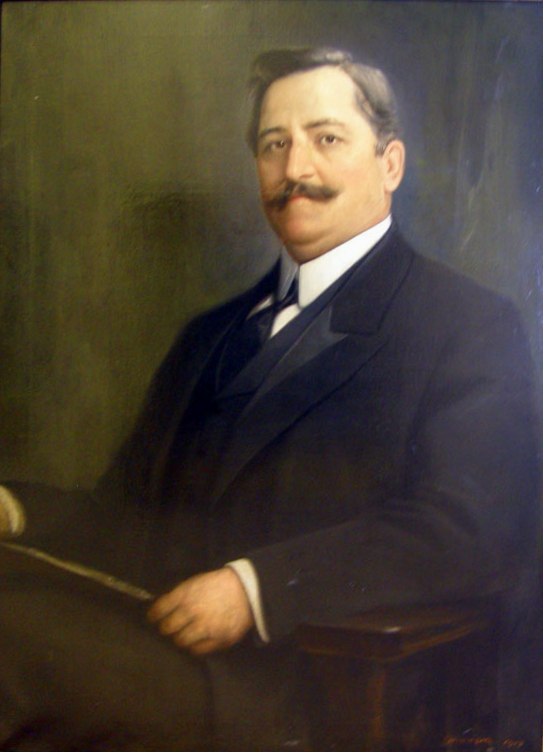
Portrait of Dabney by Lloyd Branson

Charles William Dabney Jr. (June 19, 1855 – June 15, 1945) was an American academic administrator who served as president of the University of Tennessee and the University of Cincinnati. In 1893–1896, he served as an assistant secretary at the United States Department of Agriculture.

== Biography ==
He was born on June 19, 1855, in Hampden-Sydney, Virginia, to Robert Lewis Dabney and Lavinia Morrison. He completed his B.S. at Hampden-Sydney College at age 17. He then attended the University of Virginia and graduated with an M.S. in chemistry in 1877.

He taught for a year at Emory and Henry College and then entered the University of Göttingen in Germany in 1878 and graduated with a Ph.D. in 1880. He returned to the United States where he married Mary Chilton Brent of Fayette County, Kentucky, and they had three daughters. In 1880–1887, he worked as the director of the Agricultural Experiment Station in North Carolina and professor of chemistry at the University of North Carolina.

He became president of the University of Tennessee in 1887 and served in that capacity until 1904. As president, he added six new four-year courses in science, and admitted the university's first female students.

He became president of the University of Cincinnati on January 12, 1904, and served until 1920. In 1893, he was named to be Assistant Secretary of Agriculture by Grover Cleveland.

He died at Mission Hospital in Asheville, North Carolina on June 15, 1945.

== Recognition ==
Dabney received honorary doctorates from Yale, Johns Hopkins, Davidson, and Washington and Lee universities. He was elected a member of the Order of Academic Palms and the Legion of Honour in France. He directed the U.S. government exhibits at the 1895 Cotton States and International Exposition in Atlanta, Georgia, and the 1897 Tennessee Centennial Exhibition.

Dabney Hall, home of the Department of Chemistry at North Carolina State University, was named in his honor.

Academic offices
Preceded by Joseph Edward Harry	President of the University of Cincinnati; 1904 – 1920	Succeeded by Frederick Charles Hicks
