= Blockade (board game) =

2-player strategy board game

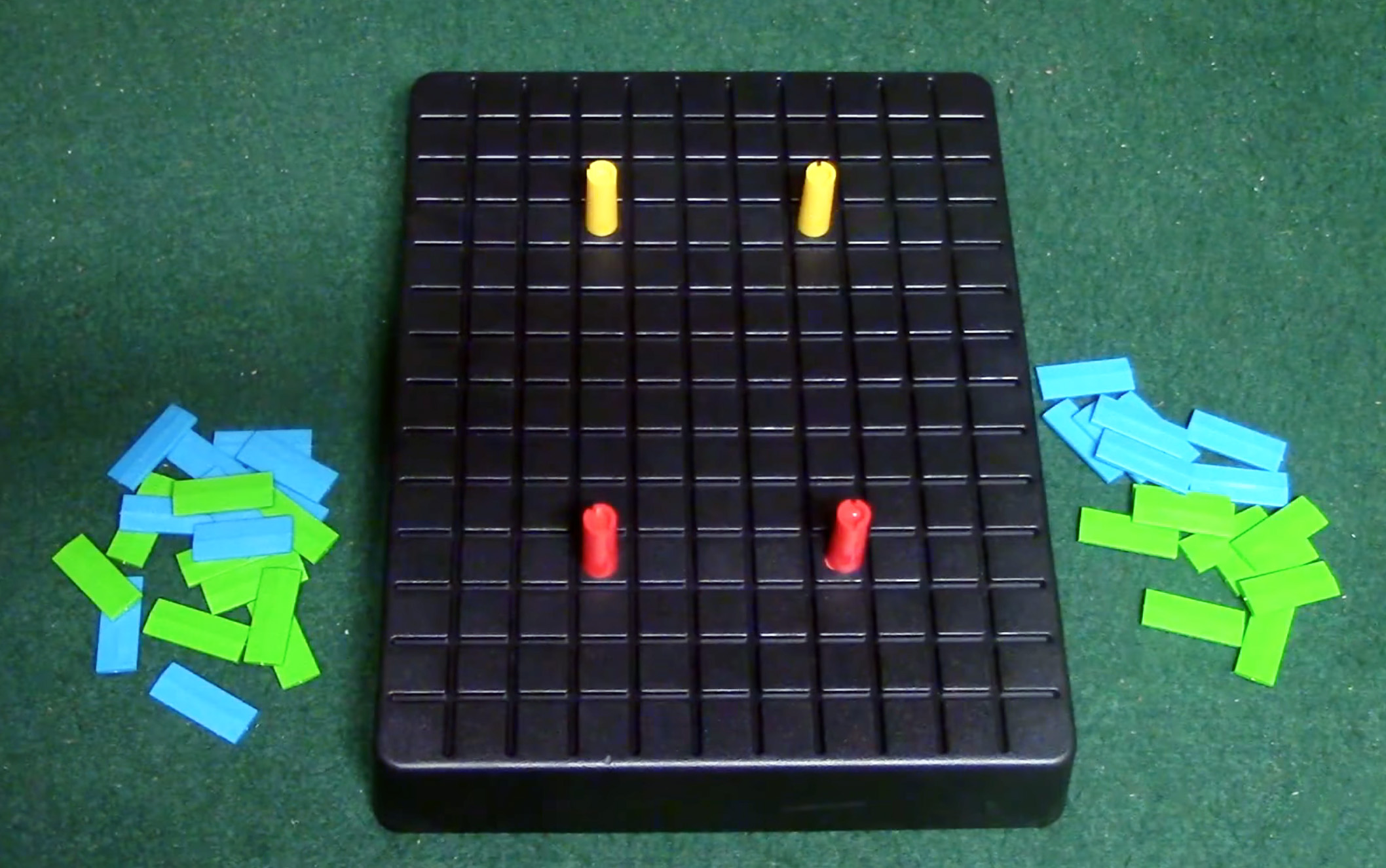
- Players: 2
- Setup time: < 1 minute
- Playing time: 20 minutes
- Chance: None
- Age range: 8+
- Skills: Deduction

Blockade (also known as Cul-de-sac) is a strategy board game for two players. It is played with barriers and 2 mobile playing pieces per player on a grid of 11x14 spaces. The object of the game is to maneuver one's pieces around barriers and into the opponent's starting spaces. The game is long out of production.

== History ==
Blockade was created by Philip Slater in 1975. In the United States, it was published by Lakeside under the name Blockade. In France, Germany, Sweden, and United Kingdom the game was published by Lazy Days under the name Cul-de-sac (French for "dead-end"). Lakeside went bankrupt in 1983 and ceased production.

== Gameplay and rules ==
Each player is given 2 pawns, 9 green walls (placed vertically), and 9 blue walls (placed horizontally). Pawns are placed on their starting locations on each of the four corners of the 11×14 board. The first player's starting location is at [4,4] and [8,4], and the second player's is at [4,11] and [8,11].

The object of the game is for each player to get both their pawns to the starting locations of their opponent. The first to do so wins.

On each turn, a player moves one pawn one or two spaces (horizontally, vertically, or any combination of the two) and places one wall anywhere on the board (useful for blocking off their opponent's move). Walls always cover two squares and must be placed according to their color (vertically or horizontally). Pawns may jump over other pawns that are blocking their path. Once players are out of walls, they keep moving pawns until one wins.

== Reviews ==
- Games #13
- 1980 Games 100 in Games
- Games & Puzzles
- Jeux & Stratégie #6

== See also ==
- Quoridor, a similar more modern game
- Pinko Pallino
- Quantum, a 1975 abstract strategy board game
