= Rachel Hare-Mustin =

American psychologist and academic (1928–2020)

- Occupation: Clinical Psychologist
- Spouse: Gilbert B. Mustin
- Awards: Society for the Advancement of Psychotherapy Lifetime Career Contributions Award (1994); APA Committee on Women in Psychology Leadership Award (1999); APA Presidential Citation (2000); APA Award for Distinguished Theoretical and Philosophical Contributions to Psychology (2003)

Academic background
- Education: Swarthmore College; Wellesley College; Temple University

Academic work
- Institutions: Villanova University; Harvard University

Rachel Thies Hare-Mustin (April 7, 1928 – May 25, 2020) was an American clinical psychologist, known for her strong passion for social justice, civil rights, pacifism, and gender equality. As a scholar, she was known for her research in feminist postmodern theory, gender issues, and professional ethics, and for clinical application of feminist theory to family therapy.

Hare-Mustin and others advocated for changing the Ethical Standards of the American Psychological Association (APA) to explicitly prohibit sexual relations between clinicians and their clients as it constituted unethical behavior. The resolution was passed by the APA Council in 1977.

Hare-Mustin was the first woman to serve as APA Parliamentarian. She took on the position in 1979 and served 15 APA Presidents. Hare-Mustin also served as President of the American Family Therapy Academy from 1990-1991.

== Awards ==
Hare-Mustin received the Society for the Advancement of Psychotherapy Lifetime Career Contributions Award (APA, Division 29) in 1994, for her contributions to women and family therapy. In 1999, she received the APA Committee on Women in Psychology Leadership Award "in recognition of her courageous advocacy, enduring commitment to justice and fairness, dogged persistence, and extraordinary effectiveness". Hare-Mustin was awarded an APA Presidential Citation in 2000 in recognition of her service to the organization. In 2003, she received the APA Award for Distinguished Theoretical and Philosophical Contributions to Psychology in 2003 (APA, Division 24).

== Biography ==
Hare-Mustin was born in New York City on April 7, 1928.

Hare-Mustin had passion for social justice issue before she chose her career in psychology. As she recalled in an interview, "I grew up in Scarsdale, New York, went to Swarthmore College, and was always concerned with social justice issues. When I was in high school, it might be a topic about racial justice, and people would always make jokes about my name when they met Rachel, because I was always talking about racial justice, which sounded like Rachel Justice. And in my family, after I was married, we were very active in the peace movement and then the civil rights movement."

Hare-Mustin completed a B.A. (Psychology) degree at Swarthmore College in 1949 and a M.A. (Psychology) degree at Wellesley College in 1954. By the time she enrolled in doctoral studies, she had had four children and had travelled extensively with her husband, A. Paul Hare, in the Philippines and Africa. Hare-Mustin worked on her doctoral studies part-time, starting at Bryn Mawr College and subsequently moving to Temple University where she completed her Ph.D. in Clinical Psychology in 1969. Hare-Mustin worked at the Philadelphia Child Guidance Clinic at the University of Pennsylvania (1969-1973) and subsequently held faculty positions at Villanova University (1976-1979; 1986-1992), and Harvard University (1980-1985).

After divorcing her first husband, she married Gilbert B. Mustin in 1973.

Hare-Mustin co-edited several books including Making A difference: Psychology and the construction of gender, and Women and psychotherapy: An assessment of research and practice.

== Representative publications ==
- Hare-Mustin, R. T. (1983). An appraisal of the relationship between women and psychotherapy: 80 years after the case of Dora. American Psychologist, 38(5), 593-601.
- Hare‐Mustin, R. T. (1987). The problem of gender in family therapy theory. Family Process, 26(1), 15-27.
- Hare-Mustin, R. T. (1988). Family change and gender differences: Implications for theory and practice. Family Relations, 36-41.
- Hare‐Mustin, R. T. (1994). Discourses in the mirrored room: A postmodern analysis of therapy. Family Process, 33(1), 19-35.
- Hare-Mustin, R. T., & Marecek, J. (1988). The meaning of difference: Gender theory, postmodernism, and psychology. American Psychologist, 43(6), 455-464.
- Hare-Mustin, R. T., Marecek, J., Kaplan, A. G., & Liss-Levinson, N. (1979). Rights of clients, responsibilities of therapists. American Psychologist, 34(1), 3-16.
