= Pinko Pallino =

1995 strategy board game

- Manufacturers: Epta Games
- Designers: Mirko Marchesi
- Publication: Created 1995
- Genres: Abstract strategy games Board game
- Players: 2
- Setup time: 1 Minute
- Playing time: 20 Minutes
- Chance: None
- Age range: 8+
- Skills: Deduction
- Media type: Wood and Steel

Pinko Pallino is a 2-player abstract strategy game designed by Mirko Marchesi and published by Epta Games in 1995.

== Game design ==
A dark wooden plaque is divided into 11 x 11 squares by grooved lines. In total there are 2 pawns and 42 walls. Each player has a steel pawn and 21 steel walls. Pinko Pallino is designed exclusively for 2 players.

== Gameplay and Rules ==
With players on opposite sides of the board, each player places a pawn on the middle square of the near side of the board. The goal is to move this pawn across the board to reach the last row on the opposite side. On each turn a player can either move this pawn one square, or place a wall. When a player runs out of walls to place, they can only move their pawn.

Placed walls remain unmoved until the game ends. The only limit to placing them is that they can never totally enclose either of the pawns: they must leave a way, no matter how long, to reach the far side.

A pawn can move one square in any direction (horizontally, vertically, or diagonally), unless there is a wall in the way.

== History ==
The game was created by Mirko Marchesi in 1995. Pinko Pallino is inspired by the previous game called Blockade by Philip Slater in 1975.

2 years later, the game was licensed to Gigamic for an international edition under the title of Quoridor. Quoridor has a smaller board (9x9), 4 wooden pawns (for 2 or 4 players), 20 wooden fences total (10 each in a 2-player game, or 5 each in a 4-player game) and the abolition of diagonal movement. This decision reduced the cost of the game's production and increased its playability.

== Notation ==
The creator of the game did not provide a notation system. However, the notation of Quoridor can be adapted, which is similar to algebraic chess notation.

- Each square gets a unique letter-number designation. From player 1's perspective columns are labeled a through k (left to right) and rows are numbered 1 through 11 (bottom to top).
- Pawns start at the squares f1 and f11. Each pawn move is defined by the new square occupied by the pawn. For example, if player 1 moves 1 square upwards, namely from f1 to f2, player 1's move is denoted as f2.
- Each wall move is defined by the square closest to a1. For example: a vertical wall between columns e and f and spanning rows 3 and 4 would be given the designation e3v.

== Awards and honors ==
Year	Awards & Honors	Country
March, 1996	Best Original Game by Lucca Games	Italy
March, 1996	Special mention at the award Best of Show by Lucca Games	Italy

== See also ==
- Blockade (board game), predecessor of this game
- Quoridor, a similar board game with smaller board
