= Quoridor =

Two-player or four-player strategy game

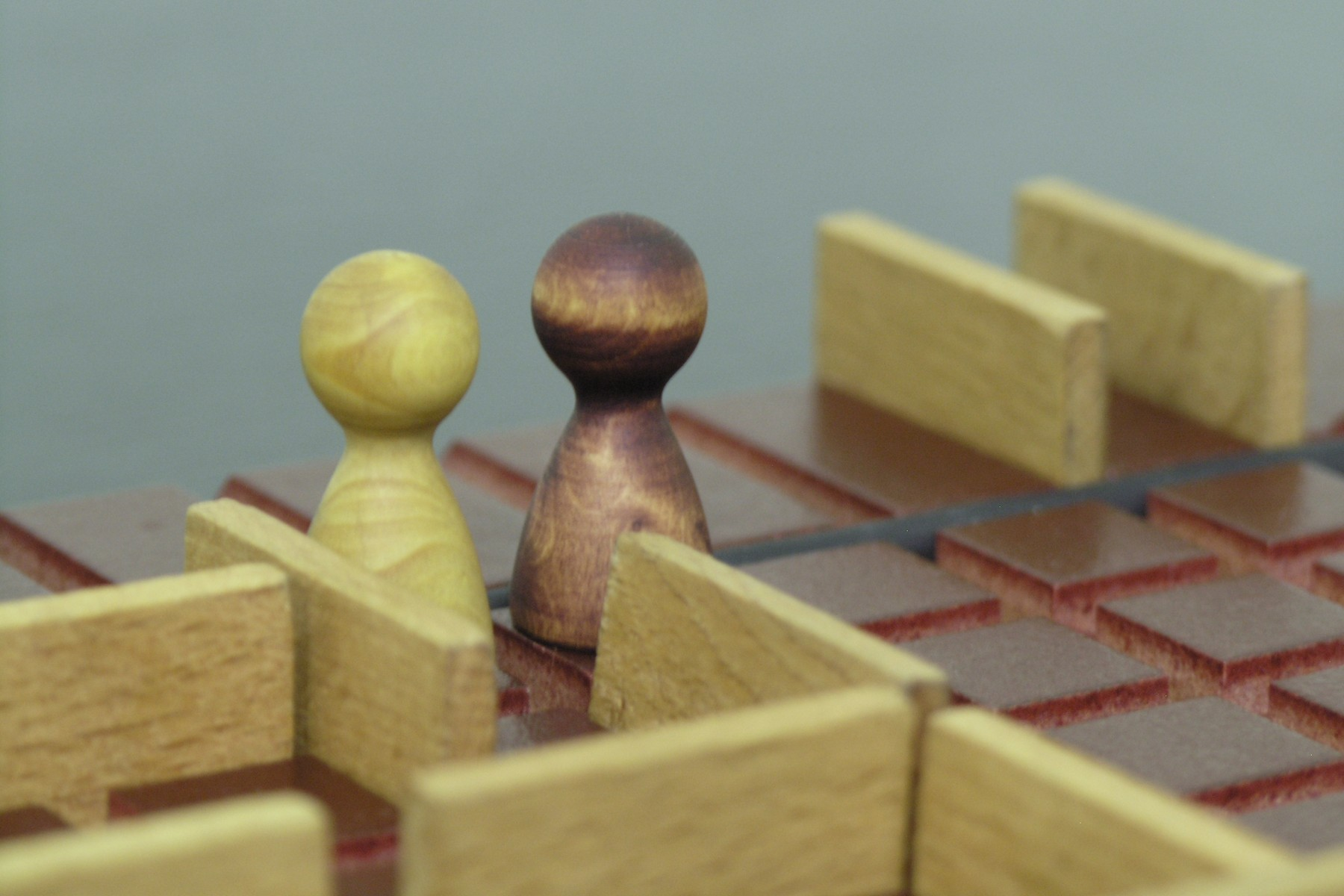
- White and black pawn near walls
- Manufacturers: Gigamic
- Designers: Mirko Marchesi
- Publication: 1997
- Genres: Board game Abstract strategy game
- Players: 2 or 4
- Setup time: <1 minute
- Playing time: 15 - 25 minutes
- Chance: None
- Age range: 8+
- Skills: Deduction
- Materials required: Wood

Quoridor is a two- or four-player intuitive strategy game designed by Mirko Marchesi and published by Gigamic Games. Quoridor received the Mensa Mind Game award in 1997 and the Game Of The Year in the United States, France, Canada and Belgium.

== Rules of the game ==
The starting position for a four-player game. In a two-player game, green and orange are omitted.

Quoridor is played on a game board of 81 square spaces (9×9). Each player is represented by a pawn which begins at the center space of one edge of the board (in a two-player game, the pawns begin opposite each other). The objective is to be the first player to move their pawn to any space on the opposite side of the game board from which it begins.

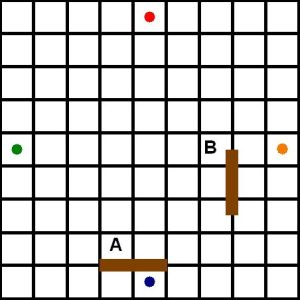
The wall A is legal. Wall B is illegal because it does not face two spaces on each side.

The distinguishing characteristic of Quoridor is its twenty walls. Walls are flat two-space-wide pieces which can be placed in the groove that runs between the spaces. Walls block the path of all pawns, which must go around them. The walls are divided equally among the players at the start of the game, and once placed, cannot be moved or removed. On a turn, a player may either move their pawn, or, if possible, place a wall.

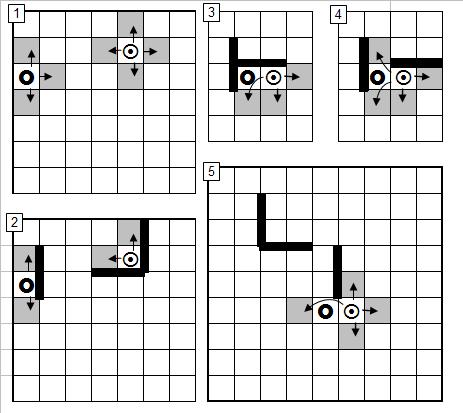
Legal pawn moves according to the location of the opponent and the walls.

Pawns can be moved to any space at a right angle (but not diagonally). If adjacent to another pawn, the pawn may jump over that pawn. If that square is not accessible (e.g., off the edge of the board or blocked by a third pawn or a wall), the player may move to either space that is immediately adjacent (left or right) to the first pawn. Multiple pawns may not be jumped. Walls may not be jumped, including when moving laterally due to a pawn or wall being behind a jumped pawn.

Walls can be placed directly between two spaces, in any groove not already occupied by a wall. However, a wall may not be placed which cuts off the only remaining path of any pawn to the side of the board it must reach.

Though it can be played with three players, doing so is not recommended, because the third player does not have a player on the opposite side and thus has an advantage.

== History ==
Quoridor is based on an earlier game, namely Blockade (also known as Cul-de-sac), invented by Philip Slater in 1975. Mirko Marchesi, a well-known board game designer, created another version of this game, called Pinko Pallino, which was published in 1995 by Epta games. Pinko Pallino was only for two players and was played on an 11×11 game board with a total of 42 walls and slightly different rules.

After initial release, the game aroused interest. By 1997, the five biggest game companies in the world (including Gigamic) American bought the copyright of this game and released it to the world. As a result, Quoridor quickly became popular all over the world. Many European educational institutions (e.g., MindLab) have also selected Quoridor as teaching aids and brought them into the classroom.

=== History of notations ===
Since Gigamic does not provide a notation system, multiple systems have arisen in the history of Quoridor. The ones below appear in chronological order.

- ASCII diagrams: ASCII diagrams are used to create a visual. In earlier stages of the online version of the game, it is played by manually editing the ASCII diagram. Nowadays, they are still used to communicate the boards situation more effectively in online forums. Commonly, they are mixed with another type of notation.
- NESW Notation: Cardinal directions (north, east, south, and west) are used to indicate the pawn movements. When a jump occurs the letter is written twice (e.g. NN, SS). If it is a mid-air jump, two directions will be written (e.g., NE, SW, WS). The grooves in the board are labeled a to h (right to left) in alphabetical order, and 1 to 8 (top to bottom). The wall placements are noted by the intersection points of the grooves followed by the direction (e.g., C4/, F3-). If the wall is vertical a slash /, if the wall is horizontal a dash - is used to indicate so. All letters are in capitals. Some consider NESW notation hard to follow, because if one does not know the pawn's location, it must be traced again from the starting position.
- Glendenning's Notation: In 2005, Lisa Glendenning's thesis proposed a different notation, which is partly influenced by NESW notation. From the first player's view, the squares are labeled a to i (right to left), and 9 to 1 (bottom to top). The 1st player always starts at the top of the board and the 2nd player starts at the bottom. The board never changes its orientation. Wall placements are noted by the northwest square of the wall followed by its orientation.
- Modern Algebraic Notation: Algebraic chess notation has also influenced Quoridor's notation and now a similar notation is used.

== Notation ==
=== Board ===
Each square is denoted using algebraic notation.

From player 1's perspective, columns are a to i from left to right and rows are 1 to 9 from bottom to top.
From player 1's perspective, the near-left square is a1, and the far-right square is i9.

=== Pawns ===
==== Starting positions ====
Two players:

Player 1's pawn starts on e1
Player 2's pawn starts on e9

Four players:

Player 1's pawn starts on e1
Player 2's pawn starts on a5
Player 3's pawn starts on e9
Player 4's pawn starts on i5

==== Moves ====
Each pawn move is defined by the new square occupied by the pawn.

For example, if player 1 moves their pawn from e1 to e2, player 1's move is denoted as e2.

=== Walls ===
Every wall touches four squares. A wall move is denoted by the closest square to a1, with a horizontal h or vertical v orientation.

For example, a vertical wall between columns e and f and spanning rows 3 and 4 is denoted e3v.

=== Formatting ===
A game or series of moves is generally written in one of two ways.

1. In columns, as player groups, preceded by the move number and a period:
  - Two player game:
    1. e2 e8
    2. e3 e7
  - Four player game:
    1. e2 b5 e8 h5
    2. e3 c5 e7 g5
2. Horizontally:
  - Two player game:
    1. e2 e8 2. e3 e7
  - Four player game:
    1. e2 b5 e8 h5 2. e3 c5 e7 g5

Moves may be interspersed with commentary (annotations). When the game score resumes with player 2, player 3 or player 4's move, an ellipsis (...) fills the position of player 1's move, for example:

3. e6h

Player 1 places a wall to lengthen player 2's path.

3... e3h

Player 2 responds by placing a wall to lengthen player 1's path.

=== Defined game positions ===
A Forsyth–Edwards Notation-like record can define a particular game position:

[1] / [2] / [3.1] [3.2] [3.3*] [3.4*] / [4.1] [4.2] [4.3*] [4.4*] / [5]

1. Horizontal wall positions
2. Vertical wall positions
3. Pawn positions:
  1. Player 1 pawn position
  2. Player 2 pawn position
  3. Player 3 pawn position*
  4. Player 4 pawn position*
4. Walls available:
  1. player 1 walls available
  2. player 2 walls available
  3. player 3 walls available*
  4. player 4 walls available*
5. Active player

*Four player only.

==== Two player example ====
d4f4e7 / a2a8 / e4 e6 / 7 8 / 2

==== Four player example ====
d4f4e7 / a2a8 / e4 e6 a4 h6 / 4 3 5 3 / 3

== Game phases ==
A game can be divided into three phases, namely opening, middle game, and endgame. The first five to seven moves can be considered as the opening phase. A typical midgame consist of around ten moves. The endgame starts when one of the players has less than three pieces.

=== Opening ===
In this phase both players make relatively long-term plans. The openings can be divided into two categories, orthodox and unorthodox openings. In orthodox openings the goal is to advance one's pawn to the center. Unorthodox openings are uncommon and use two or more wall moves before one's pawn reaches e4 or e6.

Reed opening: This opening consists in placing, during the first two moves of the game, two walls on the third row in front of the opponent with a single gap in the middle (c3h and f3h). A counter-strategy to the Reed opening is to place two horizontal walls on the third row, one at the extreme left and one at the extreme right, which effectively reduces both players' path counts to one. The game would start as follows: 1.c3h a3h 2.f3h h3h. This opening is attributed to Dr. Scott Reed (Edinburgh, UK). Students of the University of Edinburgh have studied the opening in an AI 2021 course and discovered that it is not a particularly strong opening. The analysis was done using an implementation of the Minimax algorithm and different heuristics.

Shiller opening: Both players advance their pawns three times (1.e2 e8 2.e3 e7 3.e4 e6). Then the first player places one wall vertically in the column closest to him (4.c3v, 4.d3v, 4.e3v, or 4.f3v), providing two paths for the other player while maintaining just one path for herself. The Shiller opening implements the strategy of maximizing the opponent's path count and of minimizing one's own path count. This opening is attributed to Larry Shiller, who is also known as the Voice of Backgammon.

The Stonewall: After both players advance their pawns two times (1.e2 e8 2.e3 e7), one of the players starts building a stonewall with 3.d2h __ or 3. __ g7h. If the first player starts the stonewall the idea is 3.d2h __ 4.f2h __ 5.b2h __ 6.h2v __ (or mirrored version). The goal is to push back the opponents if they advances their pawn further. A common idea is to close the back rank with a vertical wall. (i.e. e1v) So, the opponent cannot make the Stonewall player to go back all the way behind the wall.

Ala opening: Both players advance their pawns three times (1.e2 e8 2.e3 e7 3.e4 e6). then the first player places one wall horizontally behind their pawn (d5h). Next turn the first player places their second fence next to their first fence (f5h) and creates a wall behind them. In their third and fourth turns they places their fences perpendicular to their previous fences (c4v and g4v). By this opening the first player provides two paths at the corners of the board for the other player while maintaining one easy path for themselves.

Standard opening: Both players advance their pawns three times (1.e2 e8 2.e3 e7 3.e4 e6) and the first player plays 4.e3v. There are 2 options for the second player: 4.__ e6v (mirrored variation) or 4.__ d6v (symmetrical variation).

- Rush variation: 4.d5v e6h
  - the goal is to create a big reverse box like shape: 5.e4h f6 6.g4h f5 7. h5v g5
  - counter play = ?

Gap opening: After both players advance their pawns three times (1.e2 e8 2.e3 e7 3.e4 e6)

- mainline: 5.__ g6h
- Anti-gap: 5.__ b3h
- double-gap:

The Sidewall: Both players advance their pawns (1.e2 e8). 1st player places a wall next to 2nd players pawn 2.d7v. The purpose of this strategy is to create two paths, one that continues to move straight ahead, and the second path is to retreat and detour to the other side. Obviously route 1 would be closer to the destination, so second player blocks the shorter path with 2.__ f8 3.e6h. This reaction from second player is considered bad because first player can continue to put walls in the way. (i.e. 3.__ g8 4.g6h h8 5.h7v 5. __ h9 6.h4h i9 7.f4h i8 8.b5h i7 9.a6v c6h) The aim of the strategy is to create redundant moves for the second player in a direction that will inevitably be blocked in the future.

Proper counter-play: Second players' move is 2.__ c7h. With this move a horizontal wall on the left side is placed, exactly 2 spaces from the edge of the board. The goal is to create up to 3 different wall layouts to block the detour to your left.

Quick Box variation: 2.__d1h

Shatranj Opening: Named after an online player, Shatranj. The game starts with the move 1. d1v, which is considered as an unorthodox opening. The goal is to canalize one's path to the last rank. The move 1. e1v has the same idea in mind but flipped.

- Lee Inversion: The first player advances once before placing a vertical wall immediately to one side, connecting to the back wall 1.e1v. Usually, the opponent will then "help" to build a winding path for the player (ie. 1.__ c2h 2.d2 b2h 3.c2 a2v note that at this position 4.c1 is necessary to prevent b1h which lengthens the path 1 to 3 moves). At a critical moment the first player can slam the door by playing the moves f2h and h2h (the Lee Switcharoo), sending the opponent up and around the path he helped create. If the opponent elects not to participate in building the maze, trivially the player can execute a Samson Bowl.^{[?]}

=== Midgame ===
In the midgame both players tries to maximize the possible opponents paths (most commonly 2) and close their back. Closing the back prevents the possibility of making a roundabout. Not closing the back mostly results in a loss.

=== Endgame ===
When both of the players use all walls in the hand, the game can be ended (upon agreement) by simply counting the shortest path length for both players.

== Strategies ==
Between games common patterns can be seen.

=== Mirroring ===
Mirroring can be a powerful strategy if the opponent doesn't know how to respond.

=== Walls ===
The walls are used to direct the game. Their value increases as the game progresses.

The walls become more important in the endgame. If there is a major difference in the number of the walls in hand, generally the player with more walls wins the game. Nonetheless, if the movable area lacks space, this may result in a loss because if none of the moves increases the path length of the opponents' they become useless.

=== Leaving the position (more) complex ===
Shiller opening and Gap opening are the perfect example for this strategy.

=== Spatial advantage ===
The space each player has can give them advantages.

Sidestepping: Within the first three moves the first player moves their pawn horizontally left or right, giving the opponent the opportunity to move forward or place the first wall. The goal is to make a corridor to make the opponent go backwards. However, by doing so, the first player loses their spatial advantage and the second player can force the first player go backwards. Therefore, this is considered as a bad move.

== Derivations of the game ==
There are different board sizes of the game: Pocket < Mini < Standard < Deluxe < Giant

- Quoridor Pocket: A portable version. The regular version of the board and top is made of wood, but the "pocket" is made of plastic.
- Quoridor Mini / Quoridor Travel: A smaller version.
- Quoridor: Known, standard sized game board.
- Quoridor Deluxe: A carved version of wood. The game board is not painted and colored, the wood grain is visible. Size of the board is one size larger than the regular version. The color of the pieces has also been changed.
- Quoridor Giant: The design is the same as the regular version, but the size is about 4 times bigger.

Quoridor Kid: In 2004 Gigamic released the Children's version. The number of squares on the board is 7×7 squares, which is one size smaller than the regular version, and the number of walls is 16 (for two players, each player gets eight walls; for four players, four each). Other rules are the same. The board is round and yellow, where classic figures are replaced with a mice. The top is in the shape of a mouse, and a cheese top is placed in the back of the row on the other side, adding the theme of "a mouse is trying to reach the cheese."

== Awards ==
In 1997, the game was awarded the Mensa Select, a prize given to five board games by the American Mensa every year. It was also by Games Magazine named Game of the Year 1998.

Quoridor: Awards
Year	Awards	Country	Result
1996	Special mention at the award Best of Show (for Pinko Pallino) by Lucca Games	Italy	
1997	Mensa Select: Top 5 Best Games	United States	Won
1997	Gold Award by Parents' Choice	United States	Won
1997	Best Bet of the Canadian Toy Testing Council	Canada	Won
1997	Prix d'Excellence des Consommateurs (Consumer's Toy Award)	Canada	Won
1997	Spielgut	Germany	Won
1997	Grand Prix du Jouet	France	Won
1997	Toy Award	Belgium	Won
1998	Games 100 by Games Magazine	United States	Won
1998	Game of the year by Games Magazine	United States	Won

The Children's version of the game Quoridor Kid won four awards.

Quoridor Kid: Awards
Year	Awards	Country	Result
2006	Creative Child Magazine Preferred choice award	United States	Won
2008	Best Children's Game by Boardgames Australia	Australia	Won
2009	Best children's game	Finland	Won
2009	Best children's game	Sweden	Won

== Competitions ==
Mindsports Olympiad: As part of the Mindsports Olympiad 2020, Quoridor was played.

Pentamind World Championship: In 2018, Quoridor was played among 5 games in the Pentamind tournament.

MINDLAB: Kids between the ages 9–12 can participate in this yearly tournament.

== Miscellanea ==
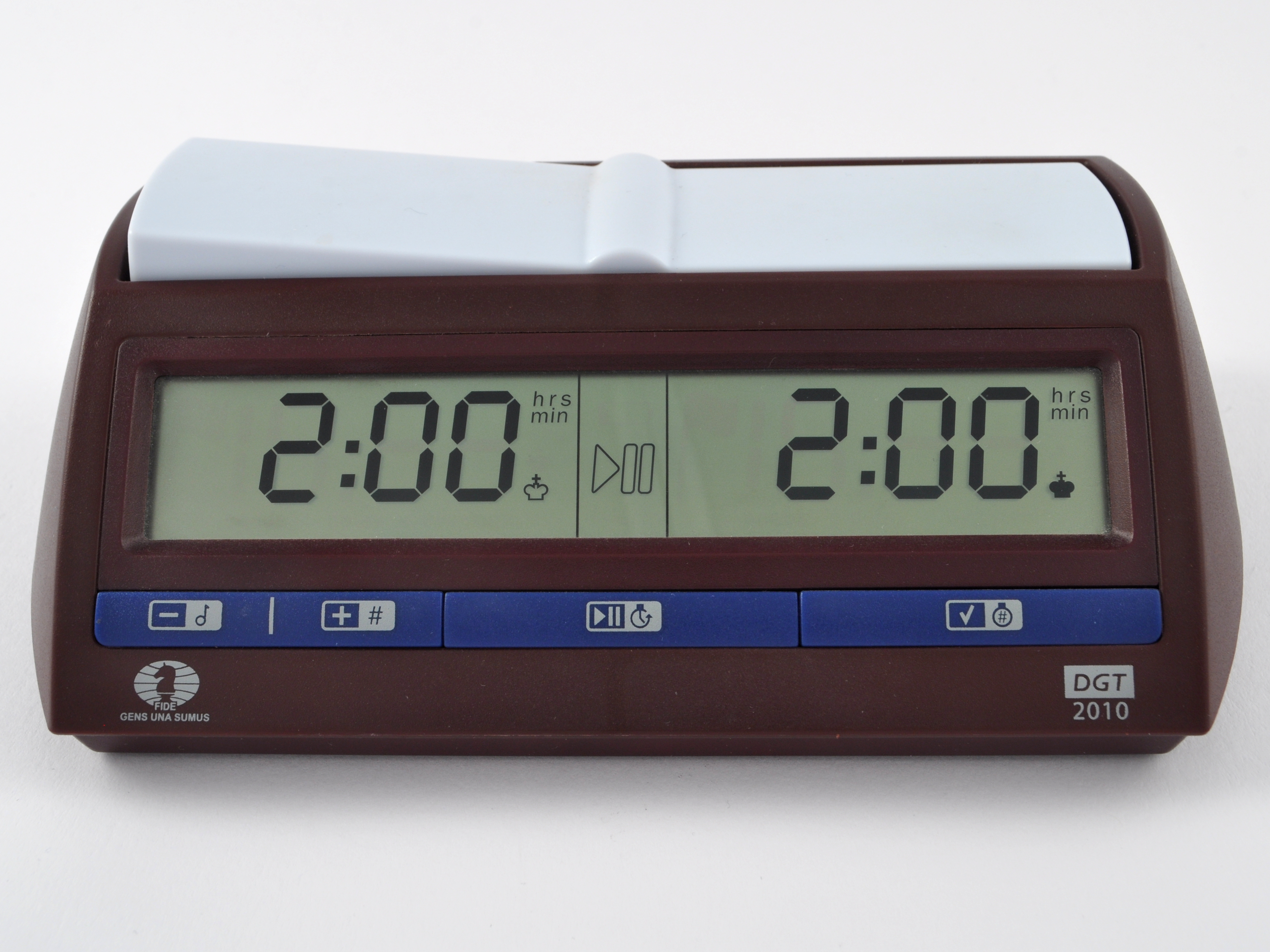
A digital chess clock

=== Time control ===
In competition, Quoridor games are played with a time control. If a player's time runs out before the game is completed, the game is automatically lost.

Time can be controlled using a chess clock that has two displays, one for each player's remaining time. Analog chess clocks have been largely replaced by digital clocks, which allow for time controls with increments.
