= Warren Bennis =

Leadership studies influencer (1925-2014)

- Born: Warren Gamaliel Bennis; March 8, 1925; New York City, New York, U.S.
- Died: July 31, 2014 (aged 89); Los Angeles, California, U.S.
- Occupations: University Professor, Distinguished Professor of Business Administration, Founding Chairman, The Leadership Institute, University of Southern California; Provost, SUNY-Buffalo; President Emeritus, University of Cincinnati; Consultant, various Fortune 500 Companies; Chairman, BOD, Harvard University Kennedy School of Government Center for Public Leadership
- Spouse(s): Clurie Williams Bennis, (m. 1962, div. 1980), Grace Gabe (m. November 29, 1992)
- Children: Katharine Bennis, John Leslie Bennis, Will Martin Bennis

Warren Gamaliel Bennis (March 8, 1925 – July 31, 2014) was an American scholar, organizational consultant and author, widely regarded as a pioneer of the contemporary field of Leadership studies. Bennis was University Professor and Distinguished Professor of Business Administration and Founding Chairman of The Leadership Institute at the University of Southern California.

"His work at MIT in the 1960s on group behavior foreshadowed – and helped bring about – today's headlong plunge into less hierarchical, more democratic and adaptive institutions, private and public," management expert Tom Peters wrote in 1993 in the foreword to Bennis' An Invented Life: Reflections on Leadership and Change.

Management expert James O'Toole, in a 2005 issue of Compass, published by Harvard University's John F. Kennedy School of Government, claimed that Bennis developed "an interest in a then-nonexistent field that he would ultimately make his own—leadership—with the publication of his 'Revisionist Theory of Leadership' in Harvard Business Review in 1961." O'Toole observed that Bennis challenged the prevailing wisdom by showing that humanistic, democratic-style leaders are better suited to dealing with the complexity and change that characterize the leadership environment.

== Military service and education ==
Bennis was born in The Bronx and grew up within a working-class Jewish family in Westwood, New Jersey, before enlisting in the United States Army in 1943. He would go on to serve as one of the Army's youngest infantry officers in the European theater of operations, and was awarded the Purple Heart and Bronze Star.

Following his military service, Bennis enrolled in Antioch College in 1947, where he earned his BA in 1951. In 1952, Bennis was awarded an Honors Certificate from London School of Economics, and Hicks Fellow from MIT. Antioch president Douglas McGregor, considered one of the founders of the modern democratic management philosophy, would take Bennis on as a protégé, a scholarly relationship that would prove fruitful when both later served as professors at the MIT Sloan School of Management. Bennis earned his PhD from MIT in 1955, majoring in Social Sciences and Economics. There, Bennis would hold the post of chairman of the Organizational Studies Department.

== Career ==
Within the area of management, Bennis sought to move from theory to practice in 1967, taking the post of provost of the State University of New York at Buffalo and the presidency of the University of Cincinnati in 1971. He authored two books on leadership during his presidency: The Leaning Ivory Tower, 1973, and The Unconscious Conspiracy: Why Leaders Can't Lead, 1976.

Bennis chose to return to the life of a teacher, consultant and author following a heart attack in 1979, joining the faculty of the University of Southern California. Most of the best-known of his 27 books followed, including the bestselling Leaders and On Becoming A Leader, both translated into 21 languages. An Invented Life was nominated for a Pulitzer Prize. More recent books, Organizing Genius, 1997, Co-Leaders, 1999, and Managing The Dream, 2000, summarize Bennis's interests in leadership, judgment, organizational change and creative collaboration. Geeks & Geezers, 2002, examines the differences and similarities between leaders thirty years and younger and leaders seventy years and older. He was inducted into Omicron Delta Kappa in 2002 while at USC.

Bennis spent time as an adviser to four United States presidents and several other public figures, and has also consulted for numerous FORTUNE 500 companies.

He spent time on the faculties of Harvard and Boston University and taught at the Indian Institute of Management Calcutta (IIM-C), INSEAD and IMD. In addition to his posts at USC, Bennis served as chairman of the Advisory Board of the Center for Public Leadership at Harvard University's Kennedy School. He was a visiting professor of leadership at the University of Exeter (UK) and a senior fellow at UCLA's School of Public Policy and Social Research.

== Impact ==
The Wall Street Journal named him one of the top ten most sought speakers on management in 1993; Forbes magazine referred to him as the "dean of leadership gurus" in 1996. The Financial Times referred to him in 2000 as "the professor who established leadership as a respectable academic field." In August, 2007, Business Week ranked him as one of the top ten thought leaders in business.

His work On Becoming a Leader, originally published in 1989, lays the foundation that a leader must be authentic, i.e. author of one's own creation; a combination of experience, self-knowledge, and personal ethics. This need for an effective leader to remain true to their self-invention would be further expanded upon by others into what has become known as the authentic leadership approach.

Bennis created the Warren Bennis Leadership Institute (WBLI) at the University of Cincinnati, where he was the 22nd president. The WBLI teaches core values in becoming a leader, based on the idea that leaders are made.

== Bibliography ==
Warren Bennis has written approximately 30 books, many with co-authors. Here is a selection:

- 1974, The Leaning Ivory Tower (ISBN 0875891578)
- 1985, The Planning of Change (ISBN 0030895189)
- 1992, Visionary Leadership: Creating a Compelling Sense of Direction for Your Organization
- 1993, Beyond Bureaucracy: Essays on the Development and Evolution of Human Organization
- 1993, The Unreality Industry: The Deliberate Manufacturing of Falsehood and What It Is Doing to Our Lives
- 1997, Beyond Counterfeit Leadership: How You Can Become a More Authentic Leader
- 1997, Beyond Leadership: Balancing Economics, Ethics and Ecology (ISBN 155786960X)
- 1997, Organizing Genius: The Secrets of Creative Collaboration (ISBN 0201570513)
- 1997, Why Leaders Can't Lead: The Unconscious Conspiracy Continues (ISBN 1555421520)
- 1998, The Temporary Society co-authored with Philip Slater (2nd edition)
- 1999, Co-Leaders: The Power of Great Partnerships
- 1999, Managing People Is Like Herding Cats: Warren Bennis on Leadership (ISBN 096349175X)
- 2000, Managing the Dream: Reflections on Leadership and Change (ISBN 0738203327)
- 2000, "Best Practices in Leadership Development" (ISBN 0787952370)
- 2002, Geeks & Geezers : How Era, Values, and Defining Moments Shape Leaders (ISBN 1578515823)
- 2003, Leaders: Strategies for Taking Charge (ISBN 0887308392)
- 2005, Reinventing Leadership: Strategies to Empower the Organization (ISBN 9780060820527)
- 2008, Transparency: How Leaders Create a Culture of Candor co-authored with Daniel Goleman and James O'Toole (ISBN 0470278765, ISBN 978-0-470-27876-5)
- 2009, Judgment: How Great Leaders Make Winning Calls co-authored with Noel Tichy (ISBN 1591841534, ISBN 978-1-59184-153-1)
- 2009, On Becoming a Leader (20th Anniversary Edition/3rd edition) (ISBN 0738208175)
- 2010, Still Surprised: A Memoir of a Life in Leadership co-authored with Patricia Ward Biederman (ISBN 9780470432389)

Academic offices
Preceded by Walter C. Langsam	President of the University of Cincinnati; 1971 – 1977	Succeeded by Henry R. Winkler
