= Noel Tichy =

Noel M. Tichy is an American management consultant, author and educator. He has co-authored, edited or contributed to over 30 books. While teaching at the MBA program at the University of Michigan (Ross School of Business), Tichy along with Jim Danko and Paul Danos, first instituted " the defining attribute" of the program: Multidisciplinary Action Projects in which students work on an actual corporate business issue. In 2009, the Washington Post named Control Your Destiny or Someone Else Will which he co-authored with Stratford Sherman as one of the Top 10 leadership books. As the director of global development at GE's Crotonville, from 1985 to 1987 he instituted the action learning programs which helped make it "one of the premiere corporate learning centers in the world."

He has been named one of the top "Management Gurus". He is an advocate of leaders being teachers as well as managers. He is the co-author along with Warren Bennis of Judgment: How Winning Leaders Make Great Calls. The New York Times review stated that they "write about 'empowering frontline people,' but they seem hung up on finding that single Great Leader. " His book Succession says that most organization's leadership succession plans are merely check-the-box activities which are not appropriately executed and outlines seven common failures. The New York Times says that his book is "sometimes angry" and uses case studies to make his points. Tichy has been an adviser for over 30 CEO transitions, including General Motors.

Tichy is a professor at the University of Michigan Business School. He has an undergraduate degree from Colgate University (1986) and graduates and Ph.D. from Columbia University. He taught at Yale in 1972 and was a professor at Columbia University from 1972 to 1980 before becoming a professor at the University of Michigan in 1981.

== Select bibliography ==
- Organization design for primary health care: The case of the Dr. Martin Luther King Jr. Health Center (Praeger special studies in U.S. economic, social, and political issues) (1977), Praeger
- Managing Strategic Change: Technical, Political, and Cultural Dynamics (1983), John Wiley & Sons, ISBN 978-0-471-86559-9
- Strategic Human Resource Management – with Charles Fombrun and Anne Devanna (1984), Wiley, ISBN 978-0-471-81079-7
- The Transformational Leader – with Mary Anne Devanna, (1990) Wiley, ISBN 978-0-471-62334-2
- Control Your Destiny or Someone Else Will – with Stratford Sherman (1993), HarperCollins, ISBN 978-0-06-075383-2
- Globalizing Management: Creating and Leading the Competitive Organization – with Vladimir Pucik and Carole K. Barnett (1993), Wiley, ISBN 978-0-471-30491-3
- Control Destiny: Reengineer a Corporation (1994), HarperCollins Publishers, ISBN 978-0-88730-745-4
- The Leadership Engine – with Eli Cohen (1997)
- Corporate Global Citizenship: Doing Business in the Public Eye – with Andrew R. McGill and Lynda St. Clair (1997), Lexington Books, ISBN 978-0-7879-1095-2
- The Ethical Challenge: How to Lead with Unyielding Integrity – with Andrew McGill (2003), John Wiley & Sons, ISBN 978-0-7879-6767-3
- Judgment: How Winning Leaders Make Great Calls – with Warren Bennis (2007), Penguin Publishing Group, ISBN 978-1-59184-293-4
- The Cycle of Leadership HarperBusiness; 1st edition (August 2002), HarperBusiness, ISBN 978-0066620565
- Judgment on the Front Line: How Smart Companies Win by Trusting Their People, with Chris DeRose. New York: Penguin Group, 2012.
- Succession: Mastering the Make-or-Break Process of Leadership Transition (2014), Penguin, ISBN 978-0-698-15166-6
