= Raymond Walters =

Raymond Wadsworth Walters (August 25, 1885 – October 25, 1970) was an American academic. He was president of the University of Cincinnati for a term longer than any other president, from 1932 to 1955. Walters compiled annual college enrollment surveys which were widely reported across the nation to show changes in college enrollments.

Walter's published works include a book on the life of Stephen Foster (specifically an account of his years spent in Cincinnati) titled "Youth's Golden Gleam".

Academic offices
| Preceded by Herman Schneider | President of University of Cincinnati; 1932 – 1955 | Succeeded by Walter C. Langsam |
