= Walter C. Langsam =

American historian (1906–1985)

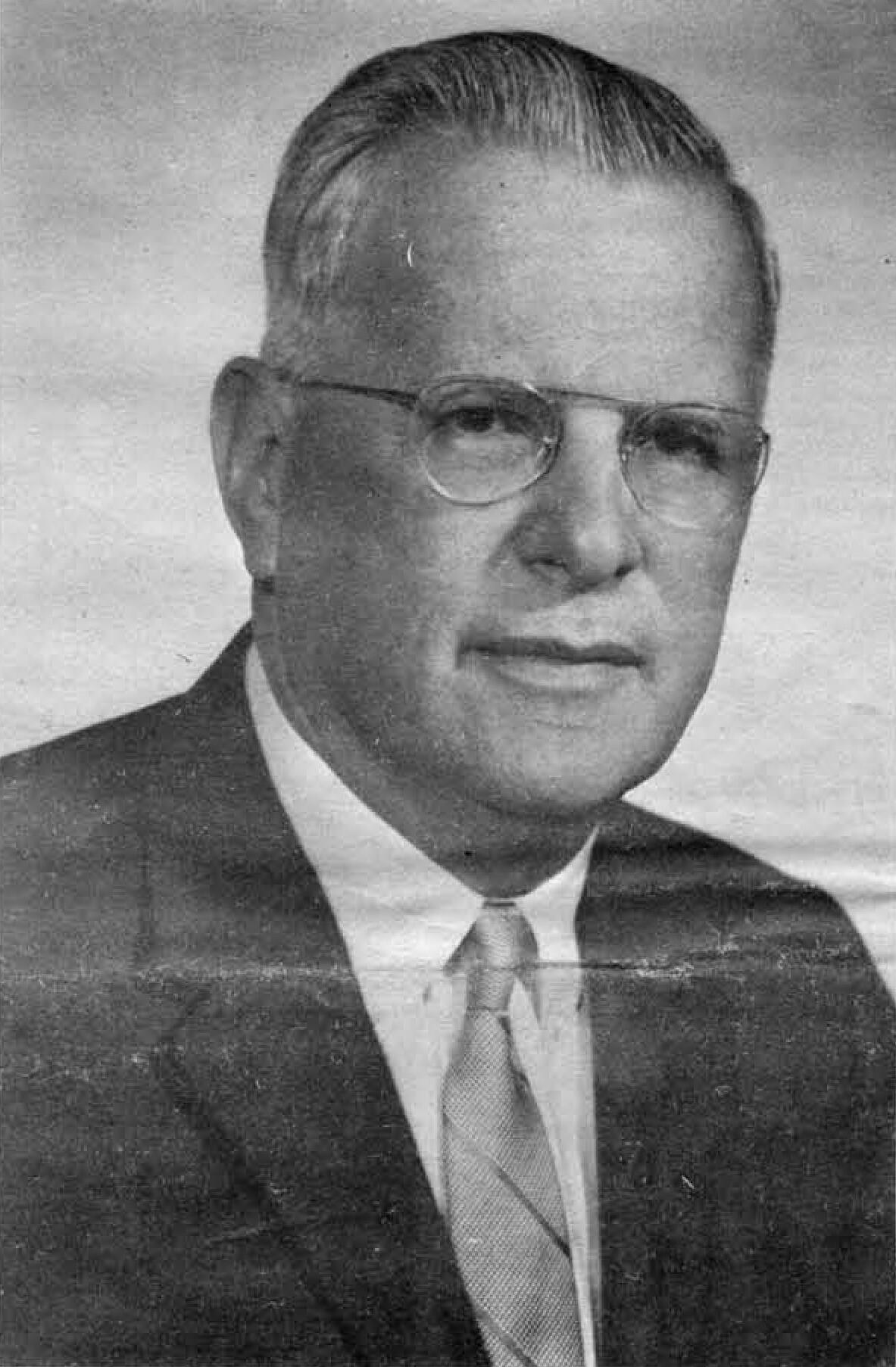
- Langsam c. 1968

President of the University of Cincinnati
- In office 1955–1971
- Preceded by: Raymond Walters
- Succeeded by: Warren Bennis

Personal details
- Born: Walter Consuelo Langsam; January 2, 1906 Vienna, Austria-Hungary
- Died: August 14, 1985 (aged 79) Cincinnati, Ohio, U.S.
- Education: Columbia University
- Occupation: Historian

Walter Consuelo Langsam (January 2, 1906 – August 14, 1985) was an Austrian-born American historian who served as president of the University of Cincinnati from 1955 to 1971. He wrote 15 books, including "The World Since 1919". He was succeeded by Warren G. Bennis.

Langsam was born January 2, 1906, in Vienna. He received his doctoral degree from Columbia University. He was on the faculty of Columbia University beginning in 1927.

While president of the University of Cincinnati, Langsam oversaw its growth from 14,000 students to 35,000 students. The annual budget grew far faster under his guidance, exploding from $10 million a year to $102 million.

Academic offices
Preceded by Raymond Walters	President of the University of Cincinnati; 1955 – 1971	Succeeded by Warren G. Bennis
