= A. Paul Hare =

American sociologist (1923–2009)

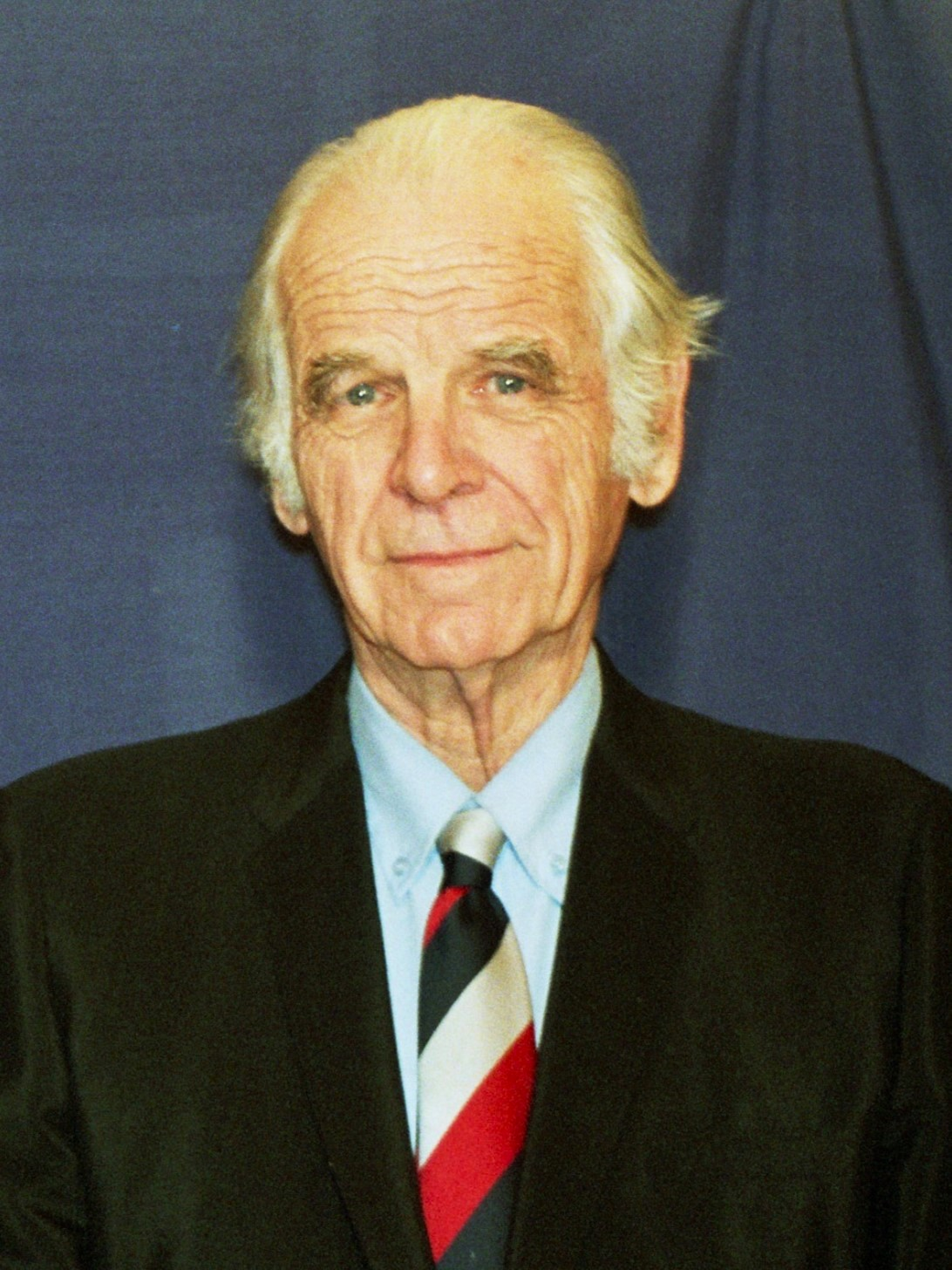
A. Paul Hare

Alexander Paul Hare (June 29, 1923 – October 31, 2009) was an American sociologist. He specialized in small group research and studies of nonviolent direct action.

As an author, he has been largely collected by libraries.

== Bibliography ==
• Hare, Alexander Paul, Edgar F. Borgatta, and Robert Freed Bales. Small groups. Knopf, 1965.
• Hare, Alexander Paul, Edgar F Borgatta, and Robert Freed Bales. Small groups: Studies in social interaction. Knopf, 1965.
• Hare, Alexander Paul, and Herbert H. Blumberg (Eds.). Nonviolent direct action: American cases, social-psychological analyses. Corpus Books, 1968.
• Hare, Alexander Paul. Handbook of small group research. Free Press, 1976.
• Hare, Alexander Paul, and Herbert H. Blumberg (Eds.). Liberation without violence: A third-party approach. Rowman and Littlefield, 1977.
• Hare, Alexander Paul, Gerd Wiendieck, and Max H. Von Broembsen. South Africa: Sociological analyses. Oxford University Press, 1979.
• Hare, A. Paul, and Herbert H. Blumberg (Eds.). A search for peace and justice: Reflections of Michael Scott. Rowman & Littlefield, 1980.
• Hare, Alexander Paul. Creativity in small groups. Sage, 1982.
• Blumberg, Herbert H., A. Paul Hare, M. Valerie Kent, and Martin F. Davies (Eds.). Small groups and social interaction (2 vols.). Wiley, 1983.
• Hare, Alexander Paul. Social interaction as drama: applications from conflict resolution. Sage, 1985.
• Hare, Alexander Paul, and Herbert H. Blumberg (Eds.). Dramaturgical analysis of social interaction. Praeger, 1988.
• Hare, Alexander Paul. Groups, teams, and social interaction: Theories and applications. Praeger, 1992.
• Hare, Alexander Paul, Herbert H. Blumberg, Martin F. Davies, and M. Valerie Kent. Small group research: A handbook. Ablex, 1994.
• Hare, Alexander Paul, Herbert H. Blumberg, Martin Davies, and M. Valerie Kent. Small groups: An introduction. Greenwood Press, 1996.
• Hare, Alexander Paul, and June Rabson Hare. J.L. Moreno. Sage, 1996.
• Hare, Sharon E., and A. Paul Hare. SYMLOG field theory: Organizational consultation, value differences, personality and social perception. Praeger, 1996.
• Hare, Alexander Paul, and Gideon M Kressel. Israel as center stage: A setting for social and religious enactments. Bergin & Garvey, 2001.
• Hare, Alexander Paul. Analysis of social interaction systems : SYMLOG research and applications. University Press of America, 2005.
• Hare, Alexander Paul, E. Sjovold, H. G. Baker, and J. Powers (Eds.). Analysis of social interaction systems: SYMLOG research and applications. University Press of America, 2005.
• Blumberg, Herbert H., A. Paul Hare, and Anna Costin. Peace Psychology: A comprehensive introduction. Cambridge University Press, 2006.
• Blumberg, Herbert H., A. Paul Hare, M. Valerie Kent, and Martin F. Davies. Small group research: Basic issues. Peter Lang, 2009.
• Blumberg, Herbert H., M. Valerie Kent, A. Paul Hare, and Martin F. Davies. Small group research: Implications for peace psychology and conflict resolution. Springer, 2012.
