= Philip Slater =

American sociologist

- Philip Slater in 1980
- Born: May 15, 1927; Riverton, New Jersey, US
- Died: June 20, 2013 (aged 86); Santa Cruz, California, US
- Occupations: Social critic, writer, playwright, actor, academic

Academic background
- Education: Harvard University (AB 1950, PhD 1955)
- Thesis: Psychological Factors in Role Specialization (1955)

Academic work
- Era: Counterculture of the 1960s
- Discipline: Sociology
- Sub-discipline: Sociology of small groups, sociology of knowledge, educational sociology
- Institutions: Harvard University, Brandeis University, University of California, Santa Cruz
- Main interests: Drugs, mental illness, aging, family, psychoanalytic theory
- Notable works: The Pursuit of Loneliness (1970)

Philip Elliot Slater (May 15, 1927 – June 20, 2013) was an American sociologist, social critic, novelist, and playwright. He was the author of 12 books and more than 20 plays, and was a blogger for The Huffington Post. Formerly a lecturer at Harvard for six years and a professor and chair of the sociology department at Brandeis University where he taught for a decade, he left academia at the age of 44 after writing The Pursuit of Loneliness (1970), a critique of American culture.

After the book's success, Slater moved to Santa Cruz permanently, got rid of most of his possessions, and pursued a life of voluntary simplicity. He continued to write non-fiction, but also began writing fiction and plays. He started acting and became artistic director of his local theatre. Throughout his career as an academic and as an author, Slater was primarily concerned with the topic of democracy and how individualism, money, and authoritarianism posed threats to its continued existence.

== Biography ==
=== Early life ===
Slater was born on May 15, 1927, in Riverton, New Jersey, to Pauline Holman and John Elliot Slater, a shipping company executive of the New Haven Railroad. He was baptized at Christ Episcopal Church in Riverton and grew up with two older sisters, Marilyn and Dorothy, in Upper Montclair, where he attended Mount Hebron School (Note: Both Slater and astronaut Buzz Aldrin attended Mount Hebron School, but Slater was three years older. Newspaper articles from the time indicate that Buzz's older sister Madeleine Aldrin was enrolled in the ninth grade at Mount Hebron while Slater was in seventh. The school was renamed Buzz Aldrin Middle School in 2016.) and was listed on the honor roll.

He graduated from Montclair High School in 1945, and spent two years in the United States Merchant Marine during World War II. Slater began serving in early 1945, during the historical end-of-war period between Victory in Europe Day in May and Victory over Japan Day in August 1945. At the time of the war, 69 percent of Slater's graduating class were enrolled in the armed services due to the draft.

=== Harvard ===
After the war, Slater studied government at Harvard, (Note: In the mid-20th century, the academic field of political science was sometimes referred to by universities as "government".) earning his undergraduate degree in 1950 with a thesis on Consumer Organization and Political Power. In graduate school, Slater took a course by Harvard Medical School psychiatrist Robert W. Hyde on the subject of psychopathology, eventually joining his human subject research project (Note: For a larger discussion about the research project, see "Laboratories of the State" in the book Acid Dreams (1985) by Martin A. Lee and Bruce Shlain.) at the Boston Psychopathic Institute administering LSD to paid volunteers at Boston Psychopathic Hospital from 1952 to 1954. Hyde would also become his mentor. As part of the project, researchers had to also be test subjects to understand the drug they were testing and the study itself. Hyde himself was one of the first people to ingest LSD in the United States. During his two years working under Hyde, Slater began using LSD himself outside the lab.

At this time, the term psychedelic had yet to be coined, and it was still assumed that LSD was psychotomimetic, such that it mimicked psychosis. Hyde's group was part of two separate studies, one sponsored by the Geschickter Foundation and the second by the Human Ecology Fund. In the latter study, Slater was doing quantitative research investigating what would happen when subjects took LSD alone or in groups. He found that the people who took it in groups were best described as manic or schizoaffective, while the people who took it alone were diagnosed as depressive or schizoid.

Slater completed his dissertation on the Psychological Factors in Role Specialization and received his PhD from Harvard in 1955. Later, Slater and his co-authors, Kiyo Morimoto and Hyde, presented a paper on their LSD research to the American Sociological Association in 1958. It was supported by the Human Ecology Fund and published as "The Effects of LSD Upon Group Interaction" in 1963.

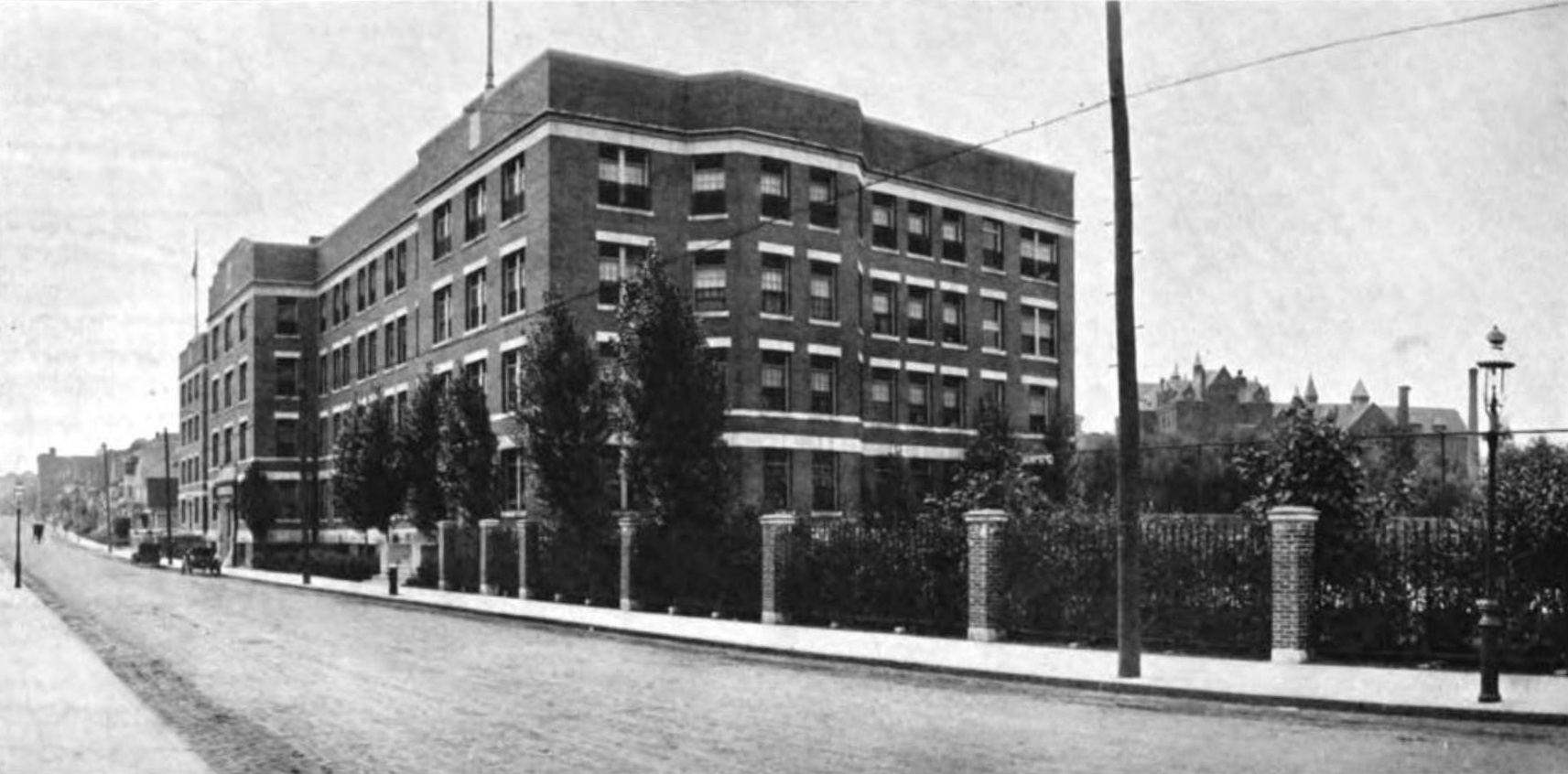
Boston Psychopathic Hospital, c. 1922

It was not until many decades later that Slater learned that his research group was surreptitiously funded by the CIA. The program originally began as Project Bluebird in 1949, but coalesced as Project Artichoke, later becoming MKUltra in 1953 and running until 1972. The New York Times reported in late 1977 that the CIA had spent $25 million ($133 million in 2025) over 25 years to investigate mind control, primarily as a means to "crack the mental defenses of enemy agents". This included Hyde's research project on LSD.

Slater lectured for the next six years at Harvard in the Department of Social Relations. From 1958 to 1961, Slater collected research at Harvard while teaching a class on social relations. He later used this data for his then-forthcoming book Microcosm: Structural Psychological and Religious Evolution in Groups (1966). The book received positive reviews from some sociologists, including Laiten L. Camien, who recommended digitizing Slater's qualitative data for use in a computerized information retrieval system. Sociologist Samuel Z. Klausner gave it a mixed review, noting that Slater's hypothesis needed further testing, while anthropologist Marvin Opler gave it a negative review, criticizing Slater's narrow, Freudian approach.

=== Brandeis ===
Slater became an associate professor at Brandeis in 1961, and full professor and chair of the sociology department in 1969. He later recalled that the sociology department was disliked by other faculty and faced major pushback because it was progressive and unified in its pedagogical approach. According to his daughter much later, Slater felt that academia was too "petty". His book, The Pursuit of Loneliness (1970) was released to wide acclaim while he was still at Brandeis. It was part of emerging popular discourse in the 1960s and 1970s to question the value of rugged individualism, and Slater's book followed that trend. The book was "a searing critique of American culture", writes Craig Lambert, "describing many of its ills—violence, inequality, and worship of technology among them—as fallout of the national cult of individualism that fostered isolation, competition, and loss of community."

Social psychologist Kenneth Keniston reviewed the book positively, making note of Slater's core argument: material abundance had rendered older cultural appeals to scarcity in support of individualism moot and irrelevant, which conflicted with newer cultural values and attempts at progress, which were blocked by the older, obsolete paradigm which prevented social change. Slater argues that the future that Americans were trying to create is, paradoxically, one that avoids looking into the future, and ultimately, one that serves technology instead of being served by it. Slater believed this old approach was fundamentally authoritarian and anti-human. "It spends hundreds of billions of dollars to find ways of killing more efficiently, but almost nothing to enhance the joys of living...the old culture threatens to destroy us", he writes.

Writer Jesse Kornbluth notes that the Pursuit of Loneliness was released at a precarious time in American history, when the country was involved in two wars, one overseas in Vietnam, and the other at home against the youth culture of the 1960s. Kornbluth recalled "it seemed as if the country would split apart at any minute." Historian Christopher Lasch gave the book a negative review, noting that Charles A. Reich had already covered much of the same material in The Greening of America (1970). Lasch also complained about Slater's lack of focus and habit of explaining politics in terms of psychology. Slater resigned from his position at Brandeis in 1971 to co-found the Greenhouse growth center in Cambridge.

=== Greenhouse growth center ===
Slater first became aware of new methods for encounter groups in 1965. The human potential movement had reached the mainstream by 1967, with personal development workshops receiving increasing attention as the Esalen Institute in California became more well known. The idea for a new group based in the Boston area began to coalesce in Slater's circle of academics.

Slater recalled that he began to see the entire process from a systems perspective for the first time in 1969, coming to believe that the people leading a group and the individuals themselves were all part of a working whole, but that the conventional process and content were inevitably in conflict with each other. This realization would eventually lead Slater to move away from scientific skepticism and metaphysical naturalism in the mid to late 1970s, towards non-empirical modalities.

By 1971, the idea for a modern encounter group finally came to fruition, with Slater co-founding Greenhouse, a non-profit growth center in Cambridge, Massachusetts, along with Jacqueline Doyle from Esalen and Morrie Schwartz from Brandeis. Many others were involved, including Irving Zola, Natalie Rogers, Alan Nelson, Harrison Hoblitzelle, Lou Krodel, Paul Crowley, Charlie Derber and Jack Sawyer. They primarily served low-income clients with a focus on self-actualization, progressivism, and social equality. After the group closed its doors, Slater moved to Santa Cruz and joined the faculty of the University of California, Santa Cruz, but then also resigned.

=== Move to Santa Cruz ===
After his move to Santa Cruz, Slater began focusing on acting and writing while living a simple life with little income in a style he called voluntary simplicity in his book Wealth Addiction (1980). He also took up playwriting and helped found the Santa Cruz County Actors' Theatre, later becoming its artistic director.

In the 1970s, Slater began to experiment with psychedelics again, after staying away from them for the most part since the early to mid-1950s, although he had smoked cannabis in the late 1960s. His interest in the counterculture of the 1960s and the human potential movement began to move towards the then emerging genre of New Age literature with his book The Wayward Gate: Science and the Supernatural (1977). It received many good reviews in the popular press, but more serious critical reviews panned it, with writer and book critic Gerald Jonas calling it antiscience.

==== Film ====
Slater collaborated with filmmaker Gene Searchinger on Paradox on 72nd Street (1980), a one-hour TV documentary aired nationally by PBS in 1982. The film features dialogue by Slater and Lewis Thomas (known for his book The Lives of a Cell, 1974) interspersed over film footage of a bustling city street filled with people. The "paradox" refers to a theme that Slater and Thomas both touch upon in their respective work, but is directly expressed by Thomas: "It is in our genes to live together and to depend on each other. To be our individual, separate selves and at the same time the working parts of others is a paradox. And to be human is to live in this paradox."

Tom Jory of the Associated Press and John J. O'Connor of The New York Times both praised the film, with Jory describing it as "remarkable" and "worthwhile" while O'Connor called it "unusually stimulating" and "fascinating". Henry Allen of The Washington Post disagreed, saying that the use of crowd watching in film and television was cliché at that point. Anthropologist Ashley Montagu and philosopher Sidney Morgenbesser both praised the documentary in the promotional literature for the film.

==== Theatre work ====
Several of Slater's plays were produced for the Santa Cruz Actors' Theatre in the 1990s. At least two featured women as lead characters. To the Dump (1993) depicts a woman who compulsively hoards trash, while Bug (1994) tells the story about a woman who is the leader of a spiritual community that faces a turning point but finds help from a member of her family. Bug was directed by Bonnie Ronzio and was considered bold and unconventional for its time; it was well received. April Showers (1999), Slater's ten-minute play about anthropomorphic cutlery in a dishwasher, was chosen as a winning entry for the Santa Cruz Eight Tens @ Eight festival in 2000, and was given a five-week run. Slater performed in the same festival in the role of "James" in a production of Love and Death by Kathryn Chetkovich.

=== Later life and death ===
Slater began teaching again in his eighties in the doctoral program in Transformative Studies at the California Institute of Integral Studies. He died of non-Hodgkin lymphoma in Santa Cruz, California, at the age of 86 on June 20, 2013. According to his daughter Dashka Slater, her father did not own a car and "his only possessions fit into two small storage bins, in his view, proof of a life well-lived".

== Interest in democracy ==
Slater maintained a lasting interest in democracy throughout his professional life. In 1964, he and Warren Bennis, then a professor of industrial management at the Massachusetts Institute of Technology, collaborated on an influential article for the Harvard Business Review (HBR). Titled "Democracy is Inevitable", both Slater and Bennis foresaw the downfall of the Soviet Union 25 years before it occurred, arguing that democracy was a predictable outcome. In 1990, almost a year after the fall of the Berlin Wall, Slater told HBR he was now worried about the decline of democracy in the United States instead.

Political scientist James R. Hurtgen places Slater's book, A Dream Deferred: America's Discontent and the Search for a New Democratic Ideal (1991), into the framework of left-aligned decentralism popularized by Louis Brandeis and Paul Goodman. Slater's last major work, The Chrysalis Effect (2008), focused on the historical and global incompatibility between different types of organizational cultures: a conflict between what he called the control culture, which builds boundaries, promotes authoritarianism, and forces order on society, and what he called the integrative culture, which breaks down boundaries, values democracy, and embraces interdependence and spontaneity in a system where order evolves.

== Activism ==
In February 1964, Slater supported the Boston "Freedom Stay-Out" protests in favor of desegregating Boston public schools. The next year he signed an "Open Letter to President Johnson" proposing taking steps towards a peaceful resolution to the Vietnam War. In 1966, Slater signed a letter to the editor in The Boston Globe, along with co-signers Lynne Hollander, Richard A. Newman and Howard Zinn, defending the Student Nonviolent Coordinating Committee from accusations and attacks in the same paper by journalist Ralph McGill.

== Personal life ==
Slater was married four times and had four children, three from his first marriage and another from his third. His first marriage was to his high-school sweetheart Gwenyth MacEllven during his time just before and at Harvard. He was a fan of Greek plays and those of Anton Chekhov, and enjoyed listening to Claude Debussy and Maurice Ravel. In a discussion with Craig Lambert of Harvard Magazine just months before his death, Slater said that one of the reasons he pursued a career in academia was because he was trying to realize the "unfulfilled" desires of his father.

== Legacy ==
Sociologist Todd Gitlin described Slater as "the first American sociologist to develop the idea that the personal is the political — that our domestic arrangements and our foreign policy are the inside and outside of the same phenomenon...That there was a connection between social ills and the average citizen's lack of involvement in the community." Sociologist Marion Goldman, who studied the human potential movement, described Slater as a social critic, who along with his Greenhouse colleagues attempted to warn Americans that a personal and societal transformation was needed to address the problems at the heart of the American cultural crisis. According to writer Craig Lambert, The Pursuit of Loneliness made Slater an "intellectual hero" of the counterculture of the 1960s.

Slater was known for his influence and was a mentor to many, including sociologist Marcia Millman, professor emerita of the University of California, Santa Cruz, psychologist Anne C. Bernstein, professor emerita of the University of California, Berkeley, and medical sociology and disability rights activist and researcher Irving Zola. Slater was also recognized for his early attention to the role of women in the United States and their struggle for women's rights, as well as the concomitant need for the "emotional liberation" of men. His essay "Sexual Adequacy in America" (1973) addressed many of the cultural myths about human sexuality that surround men and women alike, pointing to the goal-oriented bias focused solely on orgasm as the product rather than pleasure as a process, an idea he links to male chauvinism rooted in Puritanism.

Ms. magazine chose Slater as one of its "male heroes" in 1982, in recognition of his "pioneering work in identifying the emotional costs of women as primary child-rearers and other gender differentiation within the family structure, in such books as The Glory of Hera and Pursuit of Loneliness".

== Selected work ==
Non-fiction

- "The Effects of LSD Upon Group Interaction" (1963)[1958]
- "Democracy is Inevitable" (1964)
- Microcosm: Structural, Psychological and Religious Evolution in Groups (1966)
- The Temporary Society, with Warren Bennis (1968)
- The Glory of Hera: Greek Mythology and the Greek Family (1968)
- The Pursuit of Loneliness: American Culture at the Breaking Point (1970)
- "Sexual Adequacy in America" (1973)
- Earthwalk (1974)
- Footholds: Understanding the Shifting Sexual and Family Tensions in Our Culture (1977)
- The Wayward Gate: Science and the Supernatural (1977)
- Wealth Addiction (1980)
- A Dream Deferred: America's Discontent and the Search for a New Democratic Ideal (1991)
- The Chrysalis Effect: The Metamorphosis of Global Culture (2008)

Fiction

- How I Saved the World (1985)
- The Phoenix Diaries (2004)

Plays

- To the Dump (1993)
- Bug (1994)
- April Showers (1999)
- Dog (2001)
- Remotely Interested (2001)
- A Fish Through the Window (2002)

Film

- Paradox on 72nd Street (1980)

== Sources ==
=== Audiovisual materials ===
- Searchinger, Gene (director); Slater, Philip Elliot (commentator); Thomas, Lewis (commentator) (2021) [1980]. Paradox on 72nd Street (DVD preservation copy made for Missouri State University's Meyer Library from a VHS copy). Equinox Films, Inc (production company); Ways of Knowing, Inc (production company), WNET (television station) (Production company). OCLC 1300398742.
- Paradox on 72nd Street (promotional materials). Equinox Films, Inc (production company); Ways of Knowing, Inc (production company), WNET (television station) (Production company).

=== Books ===
- Bennis, Warren G.; Slater, Philip E. (1998) [1968]. The Temporary Society. Jossey-Bass; Prentice Hall. ISBN 9780787943318. OCLC 60176221.
- Chandler, Wilma Marcus; Patterson, John Howie, eds. (2001). Eight Tens @ Eight Festival: Thirty 10-Minute Plays from the Santa Cruz Festivals I-VI (1st ed.). Smith and Kraus. ISBN 9781575252421. OCLC 46858308.
- Engelberg, Edward (2001). Solitude and Its Ambiguities in Modernist Fiction. Palgrave. ISBN 9780312239473. OCLC 46319643.
- Forte, Robert (1999a). "Introduction". Timothy Leary: Outside Looking In. Park Street Press. ISBN 9780892817863. OCLC 40516753.
- Forte, Robert (1999b). "LSD: Let's Save Democracy? An interview with Philip Slater". Timothy Leary: Outside Looking In. Park Street Press. ISBN 9780892817863. OCLC 40516753.
- Goldman, Marion S. (2012). The American Soul Rush: Esalen and the Rise of Spiritual Privilege. New York University Press. ISBN 9780814732878. OCLC 724667275.
- Lattin, Don (2010). The Harvard Psychedelic Club: How Timothy Leary, Ram Dass, Huston Smith, and Andrew Weil Killed the Fifties and Ushered in a New Age for America. HarperOne. ISBN 9780061655937. OCLC 419856438.
- "Phillip Elliot Slater". Baptisms (Christ Church). Historical Society of Pennsylvania. July 24, 1927.Full access available to users of The Wikipedia Library.
- Rogers, Natalie (1980). Emerging Woman: A Decade of Midlife Transitions. Personal Press. ISBN 9780960563401. OCLC 6447450.
- Slater, Philip E. (1966). Microcosm: Structural, Psychological, and Religious Evolution in Groups. Wiley. ISBN 9780471796466. OCLC 255227.
- Slater, Philip E. (1968). The Glory of Hera: Greek Mythology and the Greek Family. Beacon Press. ISBN 9780807057957. OCLC 657076.
- Slater, Philip E. (1974). Earthwalk. Anchor Press. ISBN 9780385032865. OCLC 801884.
- Slater, Philip (1977a). Footholds: Understanding the Shifting Family and Sexual Tensions in our Culture. E. P. Dutton. pp. 1–11. ISBN 9780525474425. OCLC 2345687.
- Slater, Philip (1977b). The Wayward Gate: Science and the Supernatural. Beacon Press. ISBN 9780807029565. OCLC 3001939.
- Slater, Philip E. (1980). Wealth Addiction. Dutton. ISBN 9780525230731. OCLC 5126132.
- Slater, Philip (1990) [1970]. The Pursuit of Loneliness (3rd ed.). Beacon Press. ISBN 9780807041789. OCLC 950459403.
- Slater, Philip E. (1991). A Dream Deferred: America's Discontent and the Search for a New Democratic Ideal. Beacon Press. ISBN 9780807043042. OCLC 22664941.
- Slater, Philip E. (2008). The Chrysalis Effect: The Metamorphosis of Global Culture. Sussex Academic Press. ISBN 9781845193119. OCLC 979512242.
- Zola, Irving Kenneth (1983). Socio-Medical Inquiries: Recollections, Reflections, and Reconsiderations. Temple University Press. ISBN 9780877223030. OCLC 9219540.

=== Dissertations and theses ===
- Slater, Philip Elliot (1950). Consumer Organization and Political Power (AB thesis). Harvard University.
- Slater, Philip Elliot (1955). Psychological Factors in Role Specialization (PhD thesis). Harvard University.

=== Journals ===
- Camien, Laiten L. (June 1967). "Book Reviews: Microcosm: Structural, Psychological and Religious Evolution in Groups by Philip E. Slater". The Southwestern Social Science Quarterly. 48 (1).
- DiSalvo, Daniel (2013-04-01). "The Politics of Studying Politics: Political Science Since the 1960s". Society. 50 (2): 132–139. doi:10.1007/s12115-013-9631-7. ISSN 1936-4725. S2CID 255514132.
- Hurtgen, James R. (Fall 1993). "Book Reviews". Perspectives on Political Science. 22 (4). ISSN 1045-7097.
- Klausner, Samuel Z. (Spring 1968). "Book Review: Microcosm: Structural, Psychological and Religious Evolution in Groups by Philip E. Slater". Journal for the Scientific Study of Religion. 7 (1).
- Opler, Marvin K. (October 1967). "Book Review: Microcosm: Structural, Psychological and Religious Evolution in Groups by Philip E. Slater". American Anthropologist. 69 (5): 552–553.
- Papson, Steve (May 1983). "Paradox on 72nd Street". Humanity & Society. 7 (2). Association for Humanistic Sociology / Sage. ISSN 0160-5976.Full access available to users of The Wikipedia Library.
- Slater, PE; Morimoto, K; Hyde, RW (1963). "The Effects of LSD Upon Group Interaction". Arch Gen Psychiatry. 8 (6): 564–571. doi:10.1001/archpsyc.1963.01720120038006.

=== Magazines ===
- Lambert, Craig (February 14, 2013). "Author Philip Slater talks about his life, work, and loves". Harvard Magazine.
- Lambert, Craig (February 14, 2013). "Ideas from Philip Slater's latest book, The Chrysalis Effect: The Metamorphosis". Harvard Magazine.
- "In Memoriam: Faculty & Staff". Brandeis Magazine. Winter 2014.
- Slater, Philip E. (November 1973). "Sexual Adequacy in America". Intellectual Digest. Vol. 4, no. 3. ISSN 0020-4897.
- Slater, Philip; Bennis, Warren (1990) [1964]. "Democracy Is Inevitable: Retrospective Commentary from Philip Slater". Harvard Business Review.
- Sweet, Eileen (July–August 1982). "Ms. Heroes". Ms. Vol. 11, no. 1, 2. ISSN 0047-8318.

=== Newspapers ===
- Allen, Henry (January 4, 1982). "'Paradox on 72nd St.'". The Washington Post.
- Baine, Wallace (September 11, 2018). "An unconventional man: Harvard-educated sociologist Philip Slater came to Santa Cruz in pursuit of happiness". Santa Cruz Sentinel.
- "College Support for Boycott". The Boston Globe. February 25, 1964.
- "Deaths". The New York Times. May 7, 1978.
- "Graduates Still Enter Services". The Montclair Times. Vol. 68, no. 49. December 6, 1945.
- "Gwenyth MacEllven Wed To Philip Slater". The Montclair Times. September 12, 1946.
- "High School Candidates Number 319". The Montclair Times. Vol. 68, no. 23. June 7, 1945. p. 1.
- Hollander, Lynne S.; Newman, Richard; Slater, Philip; Zinn, Howard (September 15, 1966). "Letters to the Editor: In Defense of S.N.C.C.". The Boston Globe.
- Horrock, Nicholas M. (August 2, 1977). "Private Institutions Used in C.I.A. Effort to Control Behavior". The New York Times. pp. 1, 16. Retrieved November 1, 2025.
- Jonas, Gerald (October 16, 1977). "Skeptical About Skepticism". The New York Times. pp. 12, 28.
- Jory, Tom (January 6, 1982). "Society on a street corner". Tallahassee Democrat. Associated Press.
- Keniston, Kenneth (September 6, 1970). "Three books that suggest a radical critique of modern America". The New York Times Book Review.
- Kent, Spencer (September 16, 2016). "N.J. middle school renamed after Apollo 11's Buzz Aldrin". NJ Advance Media. Archived from the original on August 24, 2018.
- Langer, Emily (July 1, 2013). "Philip E. Slater, sociologist and social critic, dies at 86". The Washington Post. Archived from the original on 2015-02-23.
- Lasch, Christopher (September 9, 1971). "Change without politics". The Guardian.
- "Mind-Control Studies Had Origins in Trial of Mindszenty". The New York Times. August 2, 1977.
- Nolte, Carl (June 27, 2013). "Author, Harvard LSD tester Philip Slater dies". San Francisco Chronicle. p. D6. Archived from the original on 2023-12-03. Original published version.
- O'Connor, John J. (January 5, 1982). "TV: 'Ambush Murders,' Based on Trial". The New York Times. Archived from the original on 26 December 2016.
- Palopoli, Steve (November 22, 2017). "The Rebirth of Actors' Theatre in Santa Cruz". Good Times.
- "Professors Urge LBJ Explain Viet Aims, U.S. Chances". The Boston Globe. February 16, 1965.
- "Seventh Grade Takes Honors". The Montclair Times. Vol. 62, no. 4719. February 16, 1940.
- "Social Activities of Interest in Montclair". The Montclair Times. June 25, 1942. p. 19.
- "Stage". Santa Cruz Sentinel. March 12, 1993.
- "Stage". Santa Cruz Sentinel. March 11, 1994.
- Vitello, Paul (June 29, 2013). "Philip E. Slater, Social Critic Who Renounced Academia, Dies at 86". The New York Times. Archived from the original on 19 May 2015.

=== Websites ===
- "Anne C. Bernstein" (PDF). Class of 1965 50th Reunion. Brandeis University. 2015.
- "Marcia Millman" (PDF). Class of 1967 50th Reunion. Brandeis University.
- Kornbluth, Jesse (June 30, 2013). "Philip Slater: The Pursuit of Loneliness". Head Butler.
