= Quantum (board game) =

Abstract strategy board game

- The starting position of Quantum on an 8 by 8 board
- Designers: Phillip Slater
- Publishers: Lazy Days
- Genres: Abstract strategy
- Players: 2
- Setup time: under one minute
- Playing time: 10–60 minutes
- Chance: None
- Age range: 10+
- Skills: Strategic thought

Quantum is an abstract strategy board game for two players, invented by Philip Slater and published by Lazy Days in 1975. It has similarities to chess and checkers as players move pieces around a gridded board, attempting to take enemy pieces while defending their own.

== Rules ==
The game is played on a rectangular 12 by 8 board with an outer ring of coloured squares. For a shorter game, the ring of coloured squares can be ignored to create a 10 by 6 or an 8 by 8 board.

There are three types of pieces: squares move only along horizontals and verticals, circles move only diagonally, and queens (shown by the plus symbol) can move in all eight directions. Instead of taking enemy pieces, a player builds up a vertical stack of tokens by moving their pieces onto enemy pieces.

The distance that a piece may move is determined by the number of pieces in its stack. All pieces are initially single pieces, and may move only a single square. Stacks that are 2, 3, 4, or 5 pieces high may move any distance up to 2, 3, 4, and 5 respectively. The colour of a piece, and the type of move it may make, are determined by the colour and type of the top token (the player's piece) in the stack of enemy's pieces. Stacks of pieces that are 6 high or more may not move.

In a rule variation, a single piece may also jump over a single piece of the same colour, thus travelling two squares. In all other versions, players cannot jump over any piece or to land on a piece of one's own colour. A move may lead one piece to land on an enemy piece of the other colour; when this happens, a single piece is created, with the moving piece on top. It is not permitted to move onto stacks that are 6 high or more.

The first player to have three stacks of height 6 or more is the winner.

== Reception ==
Rod Rivers reviewed Quantum for Games and Puzzles magazine, writing that patience was needed to play as "the game has a very slow build up to what is often not very much of a climax." The magazine's review panel rated the game as complex and highly dependant on skill.
