= Irving Zola =

American medical sociologist and activist

Irving Kenneth Zola (1935 – December 1, 1994) was an American activist and writer in medical sociology and disability rights.

== Early life and education ==
Zola came from a working class Jewish family. His mother was of Polish origin and his father Russian, both arriving in the US as immigrants as young children. He graduated from Boston Latin School and went on to enroll at Harvard College in 1956, and four years later went on to receive his Ph.D. in Sociology from Harvard University Department of Social Relations.

== Health ==
At the age of 16, Zola contracted polio, after which he used canes to facilitate mobility. He also was injured in an automobile accident at the age of 19, which caused further health complications and disabilities. His personal experiences led him to a career in championing people with disabilities, stating that "until we own our disability as an important part, though not necessarily all, of our identity, any attempt to create a meaningful pride, social movement or culture is doomed."

== Career ==
Soon after receiving his Ph.D. he briefly worked at Massachusetts General Hospital as a research sociologist before joining the Brandeis University Department of Sociology the next year in 1963, where he was the Mortimer Gryzmish Professor of Human Relations and taught until his death in 1994. During his time at Brandeis University, he worked with Everett C. Hughes, an American sociologist, who had a great impact on Zola's sociological perspective.

During the thirty years that he spent in the department, Zola held the position of chairman three different times over a span of eleven years. For fifteen years, he held a joint appointment in the Florence Heller Graduate School for Advanced Studies in Social Welfare at Brandeis.

Zola was one of the co-founders of Boston Self Help Center, an organization that is focused on advocating and counseling people with diseases and disabilities. From 1982 to 1987, he also served on the center's board as executive director.

He also held the chairman position of the medical sociology section of the American Sociological Association, a consultant position of the World Health Organization, a membership of President Clinton's transition team, and a fellowship of the American Association for the Advancement of Science.

In 1982 Zola and a group of American academics founded the Society for Disability Studies. He was the first editor of Disability Studies Quarterly.

== Books ==
His best-known book, which first came out in 1982, is Missing Pieces: A Chronicle of Living With a Disability. It has been reissued in 2003.

The 'Dr. Irving Kenneth Zola Collection,' a repository of most of Zola's works, can be found at The Samuel Gridley Howe Library at Brandeis University in Waltham, Massachusetts. Zola had taught at Brandeis since 1963.

His writings included an autobiography, "Missing Pieces: A Chronicle of Living with a Disability," published in 1982. He edited "Ordinary Lives: Voices of Disability and Disease," a 1982 anthology that was praised as a diverse collection of fictional and personal accounts. A longer list of his writings are available here: https://irvingzola.com/howe.htm.

== Death ==
The cause of Zola's death was a heart attack; he died while being transported to the hospital in an ambulance on December 1, 1994.
