= Sociology of small groups =

Subfield of sociology

Sociology of small groups is a subfield of sociology that studies the action, interaction and the types of social groups that result from social relations. In social life, society is a large social group which contains many subgroups. It is a characteristic of social groups that small groups are in large groups. The sociology of small groups covers the various small groups contained in societies at the microsociological level.

== Definition ==
The definition of sociology of small groups was first introduced by the French author and sociologist Gabriel Tarde. Small groups are groups of a small number of members with intense interaction between them. The sociology of small groups has also been defined as a field research and the study of sociology of community. A. Paul Hare identified recognition of similar goals, norms of behaviour, role differentiation and networks of attraction as distinguishing a group for a collection of individuals. Groups have appear as an objects in sociology theory this tends to be as an atomic "black boxes" in theories.

== Timeline ==
The first studies of small group sociology were conducted in the United States after World War I and focused on the relationships between ethnic groups and their attitudes toward other groups. These studies also led to the development of the Likert scale and sociometric techniques. The US has developed psychological warfare tactics based on the knowledge of sociology of small groups and social psychology against the communities belonging to different cultures that it has encountered in various countries. Johan Galtung, in his paper at a conference on international relations in 1966, put forward the idea that the sociology of small groups is useful for the study of international relations. Galtung pointed out, in particular, that not only "tangible" international relations, but also "abstract" international relations can be understood in terms of the sociology of small groups.

== Small groups ==
Theodore M. Mills suggested that a person belongs to an average of five or six groups at a time, and that there are about four or five billion small groups that have settled. According to Mills, a person spends most of their waking hours interacting with one group or anothers. Mills defined these groups as family groups, friend groups, business partners, club groups, associations, girls club, and committees. According to Mills, it's not the first time he's been some of these groups/families are relatively separate compared to boards of directors that are part of larger units. Mills defines those groups as; construction gangs, hunting parties, municipal councils, ceremonial dance teams, bomber teams, and athletics teams.

=== Observing ===
Mills defined the reason for studying small groups as social psychology. Mills explained as "Since social pressures and pressures from the individual come together in a small group, it is a convenient context to observe and experiment with the interaction between these pressures. Scientific research can lead to general laws about how individuals deal with social realities".

== Processes ==
Small groups can be the means by which social constraints are enforced, and can also act as an arena in which the constraints can be challenged. Small groups often contain and develop an idioculture, a set of shared meanings as well as negotiate status. Groups are able to provide rewards and punishment in line with societies expectations.

Factions within a group can have an effect on decision-making. Members of larger factions within a group are less likely to be influenced and more likely to identify as a member of the faction. The effect of majorities on decision making varies depending on the decision being made. A shared conceptual representation of a task can make a group less likely to follow majority decision-making. Individuals or small groups are more able to have influence in problem-solving tasks.

=== Conflict ===
Conflict within groups have been task, process and relationship conflict. Conflict over the content and outcome of a task is thought to increase the understanding of a task through critical evaluation of different members ideas and can facilitate members of a team to express their opinion. Task conflict may lead individuals to interpret conflict as negative perceptions of their abilities and competence leading to rumination and stress and can act as a distraction from tasks being completed. Results are worse if task conflict and relationship conflict occur at the same time. Research suggests that straight-forward production tasks benefit less from conflict than other tasks.

Conflict over the process used to complete a task can have negative effects due to connotations that individual perceive about their role. Process conflict can be advantageous at the beginning of a task when analysis of the process to be used can be beneficial.

== Research ==
One of the primary research interests of the sociology of small groups is how group characteristics affect decision-making. This type of research has focused on a wide variety of real groups, such as aircrew, submarine crews, protest organizers, business meetings, and juries. One of the most consistent findings of research in small groups is that the opinions of group members become even more similar over time, a process known as "choice shift". Muzafer Sherif described the research findings on small groups as "One of the most consistent findings of research on small groups is the tendency of group members' opinions to convergence (or be more similar) over time."

=== Field study ===
Cultural anthropologists provided data on groups living under different conditions. Political scientists have studied the functioning of legislative groups, pressure groups, and the impact of group membership on voting. Small group sociology was used in the 1970s by John Thibaut and Harold Kelley in the field of conflict of interest to study the behavior of people and groups in conflict situations.
